= List of monuments in Prizren =

Prizren along with its historical values contributes to not only the city itself, but the entire territory of Kosovo.

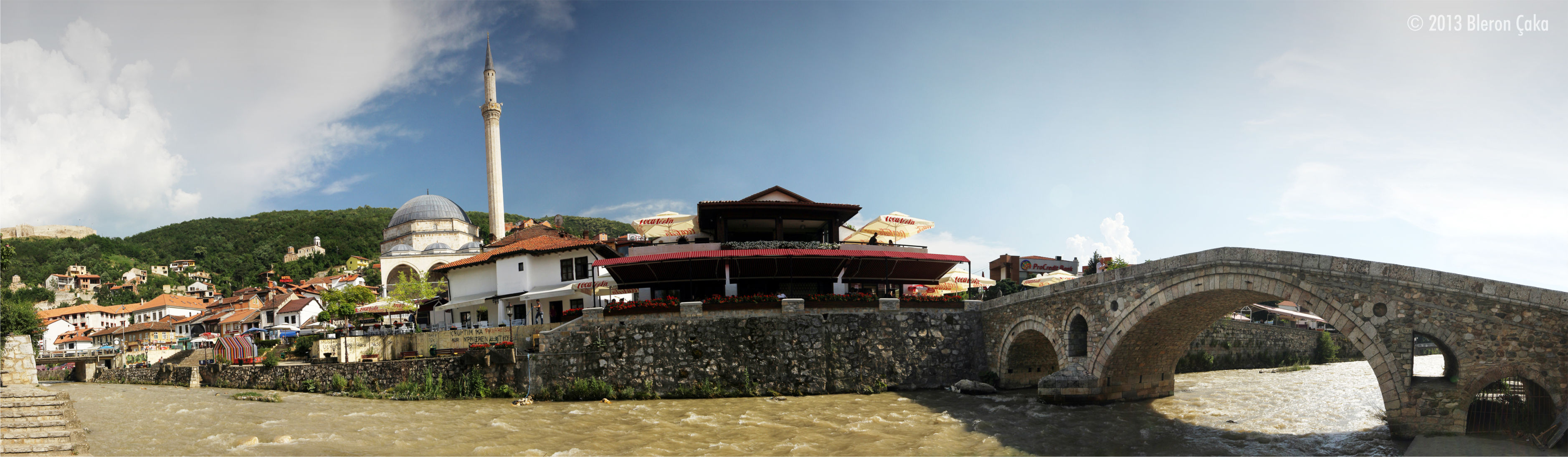
Stone Bridge and Sinan Pasha Mosque

Numerous data that have remained from the past suggest that this area has been inhabited since ancient times. Among the most valuable assets of Prizren are material values that are inherited from past centuries. Thanks to the suitable geographical position, Prizren is a woven together place where civilizations and different cultures meet. This list includes historical, cultural, religious and natural monuments of the municipality of Prizren, which are listed by the government of the Republic of Serbia, Republic of Kosovo, Municipality of Prizren, International NGOs and Local NGOs.

== Culture monuments ==
Number	Name	Description	Location	Photo
1	Shadervani	Shadervani is located in the center of Prizren and by many is considered as the point of activity where the cultural, economic and social development intersect. The meaning of “Shadervan” comes from Persian language which stands for “fountain with many streams”.	42°12′32″N 20°44′26″E	Shadervani
2	Prizren Fortress	The exact date of the building of the Fortress of Prizren is not known. However, it is believed that the fortress dates from the 6th century. Through the years it has been used for habitat and military purposes. A characteristic of the fortress is the 42-stair tunnel which is located on the eastern side and takes you down to the Lumbardhi River.	42°12′34″N 20°44′43″E	Prizren Castle - Kosovo
3	Višegrad Fortress	Medieval Serbian Višegrad Fortress is located in the gorge of Prizren Bistrica. It was built for defensive purposes against attacks, and as a protection for Serbian Orthodox Monastery of the Holy Archangels, built by Serbian Emperor Dušan Silni.	42°11′57″N 20°45′48″E	Višegrad Fortress
4	The Complex of the League of Prizren	The Albanian League of Prizren today is a museum, where on June 10, 1878 the Assembly of Prizren was gathered to discuss the program that would consolidate Albanian leaders to unite and protect the country against foreign threats. The museum is now home to photographs, documents, objects and clothing that date from the time of the Assembly. The League of Prizren museum was destroyed with rifle-propelled grenades by Yugoslav Serb police during the Kosovo War in March 1999.	42°12′41″N 20°44′38″E	House of the League of Prizren
5	The Milling of Marash - Shotman	The Milling of Shotman was built in 1641 and is considered to be the oldest Milling in Prizren. Currently the Milling of Shotman serves as a restaurant which is an interesting tourism spot.	42°24′04″N 20°10′02″E	Mulliri i Shotmanit
6	The Hammam of Gazi Mehmet Pasha	The Hammam was built in the 16th century by Mehmet Pasha. The Hammam of Gazi Mehmet Pasha is considered to be one of the biggest in the Balkans and belongs to the most successful period of Ottoman architecture. The initial role of the Hammam was to serve as a public bathroom; however, currently is used as a place for various cultural purposes.	42°12′39″N 20°44′30″E	Hamami - Prizren 2
7	Clock Tower and the Archaeological Museum	The Clock Tower was built in 1948 and served the purpose of time orientation for citizens. The Archaeological Museum was opened on November 17, 1975 where you can find over 790 archeological findings from the region of Prizren.	42°12′41″N 20°44′12″E	Muzeu Arkeologjik dhe Sahat Kulla
8	Beledija	Beledija is the building where the first Municipal Assembly of Prizren was held at the end of the 19th century. Currently the building is used as an information center for cultural inheritance and for tourists’ orientation.	42°12′37″N 20°44′06″E	Beledija
9	The Milling of Shasivar Beut	The Milling of Shasivar Beu is the only functional milling out of all millings in Prizren to this day which was built in the 19th century.	42°12′36″N 20°43′58″E	Mulliri
10	The Museum of Hydro Power Plant - “Prizrenasja”	The Museum of Hydro Power Plant was built in 1929 in the gorge of Lumbardhi River by company from Vienne. This is especially valuable because it is the only hydro power plant in Kosovo. The Hydro Power Plant has been functional for 44 years, until November 1, 1974 and on November 8, 1979 it was transformed into a museum of electro-economics of Kosovo.	42°11′41″N 20°46′21″E	Prizenasja
11	The Shadervani Fountain	The Shadervani Fountain is one of the main symbols of the city of Prizren with four creeks which continuously provide drinking water for citizens of Prizren.	42°12′32″N 20°44′26″E	Kroi i Shatervanit
12	The Six Fountains Topokli	The Six Fountains Topokli are located in the entrance of Marash. The exact date of the building of the Fountains is not known, however, it is believed that they belong to the period previous to Ottoman occupation.	42°12′42″N 20°44′40″E	Krojet Topokli
13	The Fountain of Bimbash	The date of building is not known and is supposed to have been built by an officer of the Ottoman Empire. It was of great importance for citizens who lived near-by the fountain.	42°12′34″N 20°44′11″E	Kroi i Bimbashit
14	The Fountain of the Mosque of Sinan Pasha	The Fountain of the Mosque of Sinan Pasha is part of the mosque which was built in the 16th century.	42°12′33″N 20°44′28″E	Kroi i Sinan Pashes
15	The Stone Bridge	The Stone Bridge was built from Ali Beu in the 16th century in the oriental style and has spherical shape. In 1979 the Bridge was destroyed due to floods, and was rebuilt in 1982 which left the Bridge with some substantial changes in its architecture.	42°12′34″N 20°44′26″E	Bridge in Prizren and the Prizrenska Bistrica
16	The Bridge of Arasta	The Bridge of Arasta was built in the 18th century and served as an indoor market.	42°12′34″N 20°44′30″E	Ura 3
17	The Bridge of Nalet	The Bridge of Nalet was a small bridge that was initially built from wood. The name of the Bridge means the “bridge of the devil” and it was named so because very often people who crossed the bridge slipped and fell into the river.	42°12′35″N 20°44′20″E	Ura e Naletit
18	The Bridge of “Syzi Çelebia” - Tabakhanës	The bridge of “Syzi Celebia” known from the citizens of Prizren as the “Bridge of Tabakhane” build from Syzi Celebi in 1513, which was used to pass into the neighborhood of Tabakhane, now rebuild but still keeps its architectural values.	42°12′35″N 20°44′11″E	Ura tabakhanes
19	The old Stone Bridge in Kerk Bunar	Stands outside the city which connects the region of Zhupa with the city, this bridge holds on to limestone rocks.	42°11′40″N 20°46′27″E	
20	Vlashnjë	Vlashnja is one of the villages with high historical values, contains two archeological values like one of “The Cave of Vlashnje, where in the area of the village, pictures can be found, which date prehistoric. The archeological settlement of Vlashnja is also own, which also dates since prehistoric times, furthermore in this area passed the road Lissus-Naissus, which connected the Adriatic with the Balkans.	42°12′02″N 20°39′40″E	Vlashnja
21	The Fortress of Koriša – The early Christian Church	The Fortress is located outside of the Koriša village, in an area which the villagers otherwise call the Fortress Hill or Gralište. The Fortress visually converses with all fortresses in the region of Prizren. Whereas the early Christian church was built in the 6th century.	42°15′26″N 20°48′06″E	A panoramic view
22	The Hisar of Nashec	Even though the excavations have not been finished yet, it is told that this Hisar dates to Bronze times, and it has a big historical value for Prizren.	42°14′31″N 20°39′06″E	Hisari i Nashecit
23	Romaja	Romaja is a village in the region of Hasi, even in this village after archeological excavations some ceramic pots for daily use have been found, and other items such as working tools, weapons and ornaments.	42°17′37″N 20°35′27″E	Romaja
24	Pirana	A village in the municipality of Prizren, with high archeological values, in which “The Messenger of Pirana” has been discovered; where it is thought that it has been populated/inhabited since Roman times.	42°17′34″N 20°40′17″E	
25	Vermica	In this village archeological excavations have been going on since 1975, and life in this area is dated from the 4th to 6th centuries.	42°09′51″N 20°34′15″E	
26	Gjonaj	Gjonaj is another region which belongs to the region of Has, where archeological excavations have been made in 1978, and after the discoveries that have been made there, it is thought that this settlement belongs to the Middle Ages, the 10th to 13th centuries.	42°15′13″N 20°37′19″E	
27	The Fortress of Karashengjergjit	This Fortress rests on the place where the region of Has connects with the Pashtrik Mountain, and from the outer walls architecture it is thought that it dates back to the middle-ages.	42°15′57″N 20°36′30″E	

== Religious monuments ==
=== Mosques ===
Number	Name	Description	Location	Photo
1	Namazxhahu – Kerk Mosque	One of the first monuments of Islam culture build from Isa Beu, in 1455 it served for praying. The word ‘Namazxhahu’ derives from the Persian language which means ‘prayer’.	42°12′51″N 20°43′51″E	Xhamia e Namazxhauhut
2	Suzi Çelebi Mosque	This mosque is the oldest mosque in the city of Prizren, build in 1513 from Suzi Celebiu which his real name was Muhamed Mahmut Abdullahu. His grave and the graves of his brothers are in the mosque yard.	42°12′35″N 20°44′03″E	Xhamia e Suzi Efendise
3	Saraç Mosque or Kuklibej	The mosque was given the name The Mosque of Sarachan since in the neighborhood where the mosque is located, it is built from belts and skins. It is one of the oldest mosques in the city build in 1534 and it was built from Kukli Mehmed-beu.	42°12′38″N 20°44′27″E	Xhamia e Kuklibeut
4	Gazi Mehmet Pasha's Mosque	The mosque was built by Gazi Mehmed Pasha in 1573, and located in the complex of the Albanian League of Prizren. It is among the largest mosques in Prizren. Also in this part Gazi Mehmed Pasha built the madrasah, shrines, libraries etc.	42°12′41″N 20°44′35″E	Xhamia e Bajraklise
5	Mosque of Sinan Pasha	The Mosque which is located in the city center so near the ‘Shadervan’, built in 1615 Albanian official Sinan Pasha.	42°12′32″N 20°44′29″E	SinanPasha
6	The Mosque of Emin Pasha	The Mosque characterized by the drawings it has. Built in 1831 by Mehmet Emini.	42°12′41″N 20°44′28″E	Xhamia e Emin Pashes
7	Mosque of Iljaz Kuka	This mosque was built by Kuklibeg in 1543, was repaired several times and in the inscription of the date of construction now is the date of refurbishing that was made by Ahmed Bey in 1897.	42°12′33″N 20°44′11″E	Xhamia e Ilijaz Kukes
8	Mosque of Maksut Pasha – Marashi	It was built by Maksut Pasha, presumed to have been built in the 17th century.	42°12′44″N 20°44′42″E	Xhamia e Maksud Pashes
9	Mosque of Arasta or Mosque of Evrono	This mosque was built between the years 1526 and 1538 by Evrenos - Zade Jakup Bey. To this day only the minaret stands since in the year of 1911 the government of the time made the demolition of the mosque and the whole market.	42°12′37″N 20°44′31″E	Xhamia e Arastes
10	Mosque of Haxhi Kasemi	Was built by Haxhi Kasemi, the exact year of construction is not known but it is supposed to be built in 1526. In the inscription it shows the year 1831, when the reconstruction was done by Mahmut Pasha in honor of his mother.	42°12′31″N 20°43′55″E	Xhamia e Haxhi Kasemit
11	Terzi Mehmet Bey Mosque	The first inscription does not exist. It is supposed to be built in 1721 by Mehmed Bey Terzi.	42°12′32″N 20°44′26″E	
12	Muderiz Ali Effendi Mosque	Built in 1581 from the Myderiz of Prizren Ali Efendi.	42°12′30″N 20°44′16″E	A panoramic view of "Lidhja e Prizrenit"
13	Mosque of Terxhiman Iskender	Supposedly built around the 18th century by Terxhuman Iskender.	42°12′55″N 20°44′40″E	Xhamia e Terxhymen Iskenderit
14	Mosque Katip Sinan Qelebi - Ljevisha	The exact date is not known but it is assumed that the building was built before the year 1591, by the Catip "Secretary" Sinan who was the Catip of the Sultan's archives.	42°12′50″N 20°44′30″E	Xhamia e Sinan Katip

=== Churches ===
Number	Name	Description	Location	Photo
	Our Lady of Ljeviš	Mother of God Ljeviška is a 14th-century Serbian Orthodox church in the town of Prizren. It was converted to a mosque during the Ottoman Empire and then back into a church in the early 20th century.UNESCO-protected 14th century Serbian Orthodox monastery. The construction of the church was commissioned in 1306–9 by Serbian King Stefan Milutin. It was built on the site of the ruins of an earlier Byzantine church, whose original name Metera Eleousa was preserved in Slavic as Bogorodica Ljeviška.		
1	Monastery of the Holy Archangels	Monastery of the Holy Archangels is a Serbian Orthodox monastery located in Prizren, founded by the Serbian Emperor Stefan Dušan (reigned 1331–1355) between 1343 and 1352 on the site of an earlier church, part of the Višegrad fortress complex. It was the burial church for Emperor Dušan, and represented the culmination of the Serbian ecclesiastical archritectural style, that led to the birth of the Morava school style. The complex, which ranges over 6,500 m^{2}, includes two churches, the main one is dedicated to the Holy Archangels (where Dušan's tomb lied), and the second one is dedicated to St. Nicholas, both built in the Rascian architectural style, although, like the Visoki Dečani monastery, regarding time of the construction, and some architectural elements, it may belong to the Vardar architectural style. The monastery was looted and destroyed after the Ottomans arrived in 1455, and in 1615 it was razed to the ground and its material was used for the construction of the Sinan Pasha Mosque in Prizren. The entire complex was archeologically explored in 1927, and its remains were conserved after the Second World War. During the last decade of the 20th century, work on the reconstruction was continued, and in 1998 it again became an active male monastery. After the 1999 NATO bombing of Yugoslavia and retreat of the Yugoslav army forces, reconstructed objects were burned and looted in June 1999, by members of the Kosovo Liberation Army (KLA), after the Kosovo Force (KFOR) arrived. During the 2004 unrest in Kosovo, the monastery was burned and looted again. The entire monastery complex is under protection of the Republic of Serbia, as a Monument of Culture of Great Importance, and today in the monastery lives one priest and the monastery is under constant protection of Kosovo Police and in a special protection zone.	42°12′02″N 20°45′49″E	Monastery of the Holy Archangels
2	Cathedral of Our Lady of Perpetual Succour	The cathedral was built in 1870 by Archbishop Dario Bucareli. It is known for two paintings of known personalities of Balkans past, the painting of George Kastrioti - Skanderbeg, the prince of the Principality of Albania and Johannes de Hunajad, Governor and warlord of Hungary.	42°12′28″N 20°44′18″E	
3	Church of the Holy Saviour	This monument located near the castle belongs to the city and medieval architecture. The church was declared a Monument of Culture of Exceptional Importance in 1990, and it is protected by the Republic of Serbia. It was heavily damaged by a Kosovo Albanian mob during the 2004 unrest in Kosovo.	42°12′29″N 20°44′36″E	Church of the Holy Saviour
4	Church of the Holy Sunday - Saint Mark	Built in 1371 by King Marko Vukasin Kraleviqi. For its architectural values already is well known for a stelle the Roman period.	42°12′30″N 20°44′35″E	
5	Church of St George	Church of St. George is located in the central part of Prizren, respectively between Shatervanit. Objekti was built in the late 15th century by the brothers Runoviq. Facility Within the southwest side is the tomb of Metropolitan Mihajlo, which also frescoes dating from the XVII.	42°12′30″N 20°44′24″E	Church of St George
6	Church of St. Nicholas	The Church of St. Nicholas, also known as Tutić Church (Tutićeva crkva) is a Serbian Orthodox church. It was founded in 1331-1332 by Dragoslav Tutić, whose monastic name was Nikola (Nicholas), and his wife Bela. Later, the church became a possession of the Visoki Dečani Monastery. Since 1990, it has been on Serbia's list of Monuments of Culture of Exceptional Importance. At the time of the 2004 unrest in Kosovo, the church was vandalized. Since 2005, with financial support from the European Union, work has been undertaken to restore the church to its original state.	42°12′30″N 20°44′22″E	Church of St. Nicholas
7	Groups of Zym	Zymi parish center was recognized as the 14th century the church was dedicated to St. Mary in lifting qiell. The first church of this village were Shëngjergj while later moved to the foothills of Lumezeve.	42°16′22″N 20°37′29″E	
8	Hermitage of St. Peter of Koriša	Hermitage and Monastery of Saint Peter Koriški is a ruin of the hermitage and monastery located in Koriša, Prizren The Monastery is an ancient cave dwelling that was abandoned in 1453 after the Turkish invasion. After monastery disbandment, remains of St. Peter Koriški were moved to the Crna Reka Monastery in 1572. Hermitage of Saint Peter Koriški was declared cultural monument on 16 December 1950, and registered as a Protected Monument of Culture in 1990, and it is protected by Republic of Serbia. The construction of this church began in the end of the 11th century, and it continued until the 14th century. It is also known as “The Bad Church” because of the inconvenient location it is located in.	42°15′06″N 20°48′27″E	Hermitage of St. Peter of Koriša

=== Tekkes ===
Number	Name	Description	Location	Photo
1	Tekke of Tarikat Sinan	The Tekke of Sinan tarikat was first built in 1575 by Ummi Sinan from Prizren who at the same time is also the founder of this sect/tarikat in Kosovo. It is located in the right side of Lumbardh, respectively in the Tabak neighborhood.	42°12′51″N 20°44′48″E	
2	Tekke of Tarikat Kaderi Zingjiri	Qadiriyyah - Zingjirli Tekke was built in 1646 by Shaykh Hasan Horosani and is located north of Prizren. The tekke qualifies as the oldest in the Balkans of this sect.	42°12′53″N 20°43′55″E	
3	Tekke of Tarikatit Halveti	The Tekke of the Halveti tarikat was established in 1605 by Sheikh Osman Baba Tekke in the neighborhood of Saraqhan. It is the main Tekke of Prizren, while it has other branches in Rahovec, Mitrovice and Albania.	42°12′37″N 20°44′26″E	PrizrenCollection2 2010 100 2320
4	Tekke of Tarikatit Bektashi	The Tekke of Bektashi tarikat was founded in 1850 by Adem Baba of Prizren. This Tekke is located head-to-head to the Hasan Beg Mill southwest of the city.	42°12′28″N 20°44′00″E	
5	Tekke of Tarikatit Rufa'i	The Rufa'I Tekke was established in 1892 by Sheikh Shasan Hysni Sanxhaku. A characteristic of this masjid or tekke, is the ritual which is held on the first day of spring during which members of the sect are poked in different parts of the body.	42°12′43″N 20°44′43″E	A panoramic view of "Lidhja e Prizrenit"
6	Tekke of Dallgen Baba	Tekke of Dallgen Baba. This shrine was devoted to one of the commanders who led part of the left army of the Ottoman Empire during the invasion of Prizren in 1945.	42°12′48″N 20°43′55″E	
7	Tekke of Karabash Baba	The Tekke of Karabash Baba is located in the complex of Karabash respectively near the University of Prizren. Inside the tekke there's the tomb of a military commander of the Ottoman Empire from which it takes its name.	42°12′19″N 20°43′38″E	
8	Tekke of Karabash Ymer Babes	Tekke of Ymer Baba is located in the vicinity of Prizren, respectively in the village of Leze. There are numerous visitors from all over Kosova. It is mostly visited by people of Gjakova, Prizren and Rahovec.	42°09′05″N 20°45′10″E	

== Old houses ==
Number	Name	Description	Location	Photo
1	Shuaip Pasha's House	It is located near the Nalet Bridge, built in the 19th century, rebuilt in 2012 after being burned down during the conflict in March 1999.	42°12′34″N 20°44′20″E	Shtepia e Shuaip Pashes
2	House of Shehe Zades	It is located in the Saraj Street, and was built at the end of the 18th century. Its architecture features contain Prizren style characteristics.	42°12′41″N 20°44′20″E	
3	House of Shemsidin Kirajtanit	It is close to the Shaip Pasha house and it was built at the beginning of the 19th century.	42°12′33″N 20°44′18″E	Shemsidin kirajtanit
4	House of Aqif Celines	It was constructed in the 18th century. It served as a family house. In the 1960s, due to some changes made to it structure, the house lost its originality.	42°12′43″N 20°44′23″E	
5	House of Sheh Hasanit	This house was built in local folk architecture in the 18th century. It is located in the city center.	42°12′37″N 20°44′27″E	
6	House of Familjes Grazhda	Oriental home built in the 18th century. It is located in Bujar Godeni Street.	42°12′47″N 20°44′22″E	
7	House of Bajram Pomakut	A traditional Prizren house built in the 18th century.	42°12′38″N 20°44′24″E	
8	House of Abdurahim Myftiut	It is located in Rifat Krasniqi Street, built in the 19th century.	42°12′42″N 20°44′26″E	
9	House of Ahmet e Shyqeri Suharekes-Rekathatit	This house was built in the year of 1886; besides the divisions the house preserves its originality.	42°12′55″N 20°44′34″E	
10	House of Ymer Prizrenit	It was built from the president of the Albanian League of Prizren in the period of 1943–1945.	42°12′44″N 20°44′37″E	
11	House of Haxhi Izet Mashkullit	It is supposed that this house is built around the 1800s.	42°12′40″N 20°44′36″E	
12	House of Ymer Qyse	This house was built in the 19th century.	42°12′41″N 20°44′41″E	
13	House of Gani Dukagjinit	This house was built in the 19th century and it is considered a cultural monument.	42°12′40″N 20°44′37″E	
14	House of Ismet Sokolit	This house was built in the 19th century, and contains baroque elements.	42°12′48″N 20°44′28″E	

== Natural monuments ==
Number	Name	Description	Location	Photo
1	Plane Tree	It belongs to the 14th century. It can be found in Marash, a region in Prizren.	42°12′44″N 20°44′44″E	Prizren, 800 let starý platan
2	Marashi	Marash lies on the east side of Prizren. Its name comes from the Persian language which means “breeze place”. In this complex monumental elements of traditional architecture and that oriental of Prizren are shown.	42°12′41″N 20°44′48″E	Marashii
3	Gorge of Lumbardh	It flows out at a 2360m above sea level, and has a length of 35.5 km. The space in the area of the Lumbardh river during the summer is the most visited place of the city.	42°12′22″N 20°45′22″E	Gryka e Lumbardhit 1
4	Prevalla	Prevalle is a touristic village which approximately is 30 km away from Prizren. During the summer, people go there to relax and rest, whereas during the winter people visit it for its seasonal recreational sports. It lies 1800m above sea level.	42°10′29″N 20°57′44″E	Prevalla
5	City Park	It is located in the western part of Prizren and it comprises a very large green space. Beside the park flows the city river which grows the values and scenery of the park.	42°12′25″N 20°43′36″E	Parku i Qytetit
