= Shuaip Pasha's House =

House of the first Albanian Minister of Finance

- Shtëpia e Shuaip Pashës
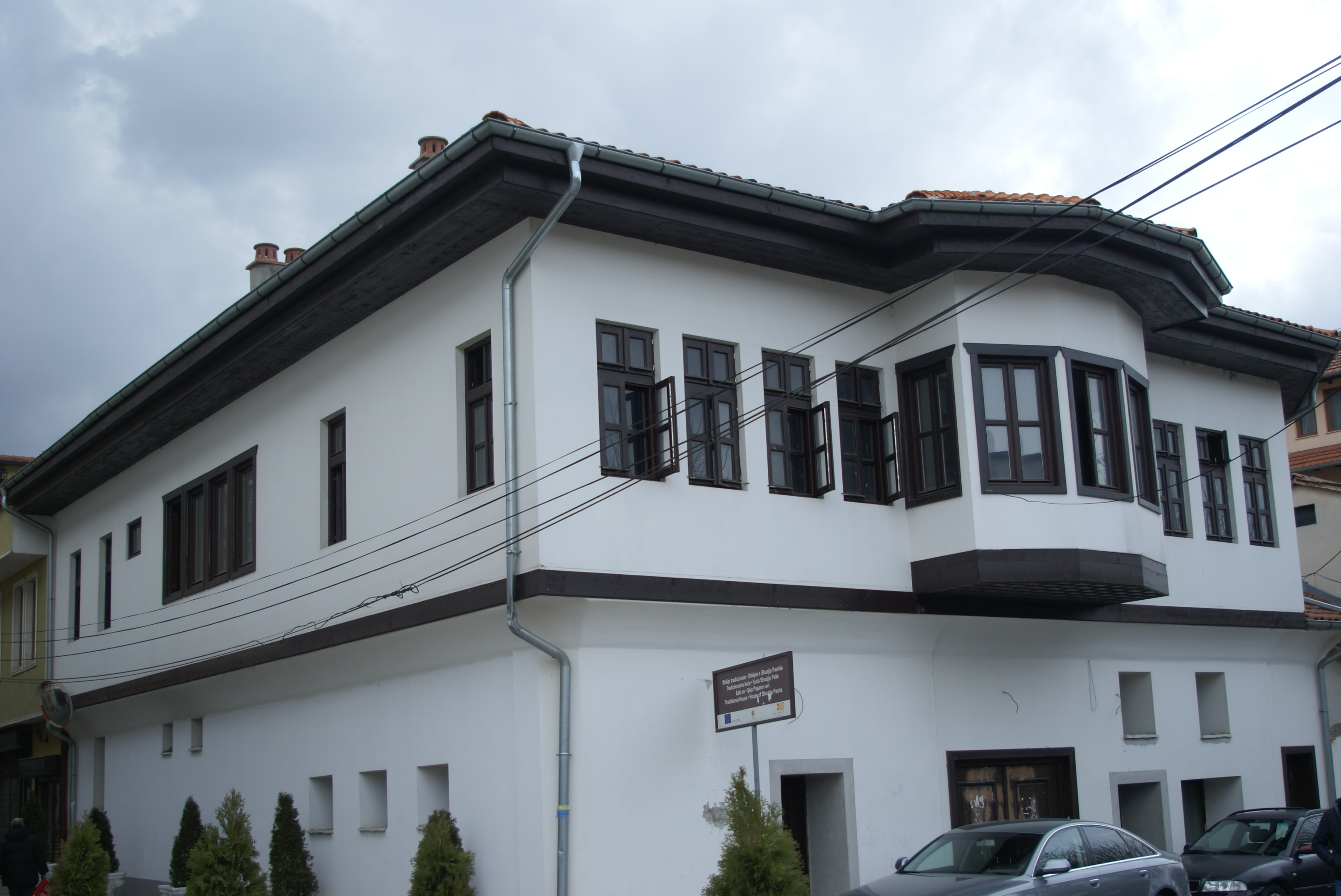

General information
- Status: Demolished; reconstruction pending
- Location: Prizren, Kosovo
- Construction started: Early 19th Century
- Demolished: 1999

Shuaip Pasha's House (Albanian: Shtëpia e Shuaip Pashës) was the home of Shuaip Pasha, first Albanian Minister of Finance. It was located in Prizren, Kosovo, near Old Stone Bridge, at the riverside of Prizrenska Bistrica. The house was built in the early 19th century by Shuaip Aga, a prominent leader of the Albanian League of Prizren, and it was destroyed in 1999. In 2012, under the supervision of Cultural Heritage without Borders organisation, a plan of conservation and reconstruction was presented.

== See also ==
- Assembly of Vlorë
