= Prizren Fortress =

Historical landmark in Kosovo

Coordinates: 42°12′34″N 20°44′44″E

- Albanian: Kalaja e Prizrenit; Serbian: Призренски град; Prizrenski grad
- Prizren in Kosovo
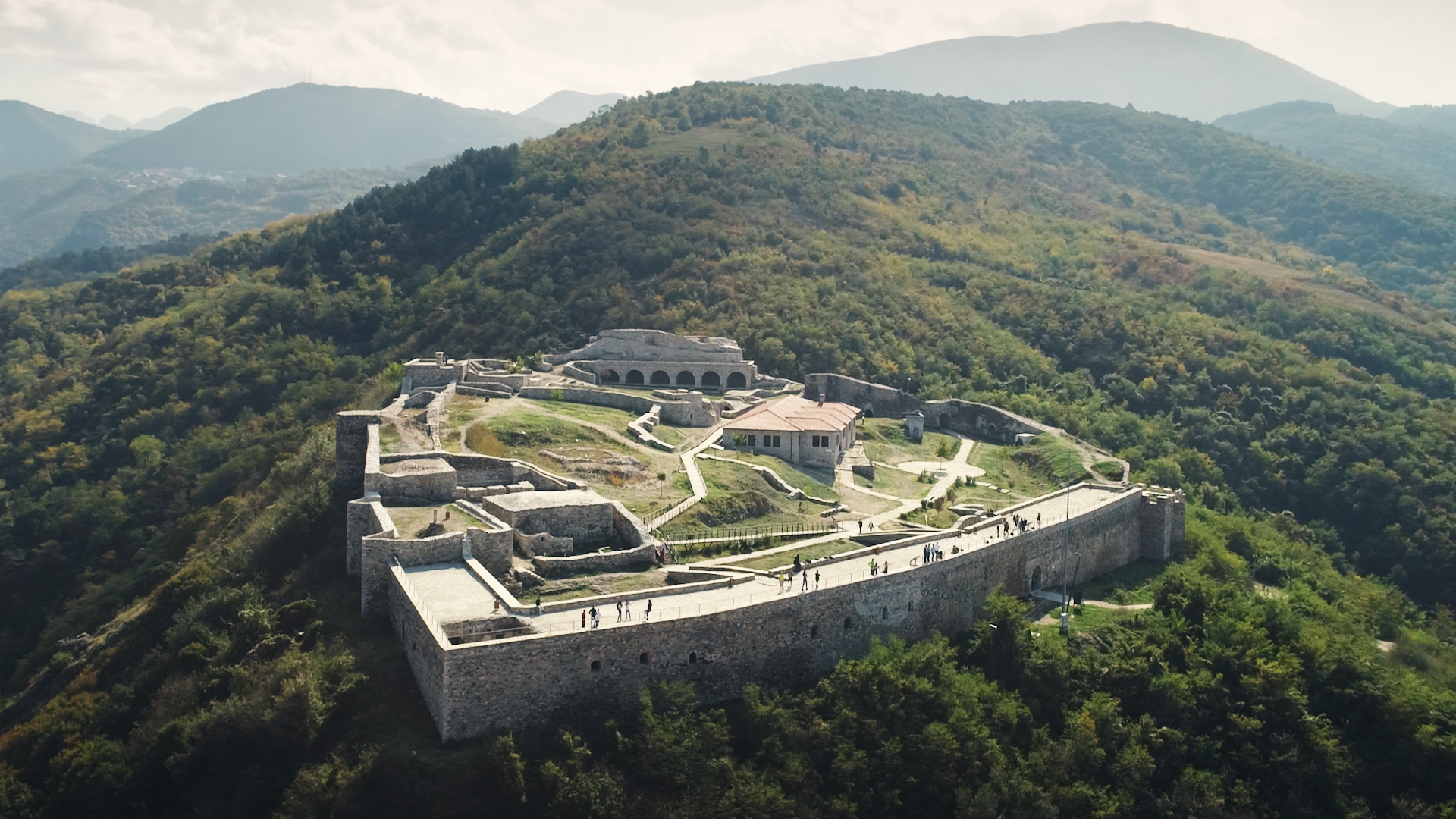

Site information
- Owner: Kosovo
- Controlled by: Byzantine Empire; Serbian Empire; Principality of Zeta; Principality of Dukagjini; Lazarević dynasty Branković dynasty Republic of Venice; Ottoman Empire; Yugoslavia; Kosovo
- Open to the public: yes

Site history
- Built: 6th century
- Built by: Byzantine Empire (first attested in the 6th century CE); Serbian Empire (further expanded during the 14th century); Ottoman Empire (further expanded between the 15th and 20th century)
- Events: Dokufest

Cultural Heritage under Permanent Protection
- Official name: Kalaja e Prizrenit
- Type: Archaeological Heritage: Reservation
- Reference no.: 1967

Prizren Fortress (Albanian: Kalaja e Prizrenit; Serbian: Призренски град, Prizrenski grad) is a hilltop fortification in Prizren in Kosovo. It overlooks the Prizren River which flows through Prizren, which developed around the fortress. The site of the fortress of Prizren has seen habitation and use since the Bronze Age (ca. 2000 BC). In late antiquity it was part of the defensive fortification system in western Dardania and was reconstructed in the era of eastern Roman Emperor Justinian. Byzantine rule in the region ended definitively in 1219–20 as the Serbian Nemanjić dynasty controlled the fort until 1371.

Since 1371, a series of regional feudal rulers came to control Prizren and its fort: the Balšić, the Dukagjini, the Hrebeljanović and finally the Branković, often with Ottoman support. The Ottoman Empire assumed direct control after 1450 and over time turned the fort into a central stronghold in the Eyalet of Rumelia. Much of the modern fortress dates to the 18th century reconstruction phase.

The fortress is situated on a dominant hill at the eastern part of the town of Prizren, set on a strategic position, contoured with lines that follow distinguished features of the terrain's natural morphology. Archaeological excavations were carried out in 1969 and then again in 2004 and 2009–2011. They resulted in the discovery of the infrastructure, which incorporates rampart walls enforced with towers, casemates, labyrinth corridors, depots, and other accompanying inner rooms and dwellings. It was declared a Monument of Culture of Exceptional Importance in 1948.

== Name ==
The Prizren fortress is named Kalaja e Prizrenit in Albanian and Prizrenska Kaljaja in Serbian. The historical neighbourhood which formed around the lower part of the fortress is named Nënkalaja (literally "below the fortress"). The name of the city has been linked with that of Petrizen, a fort in Dardania mentioned by Procopius in the 6th century.

== History ==
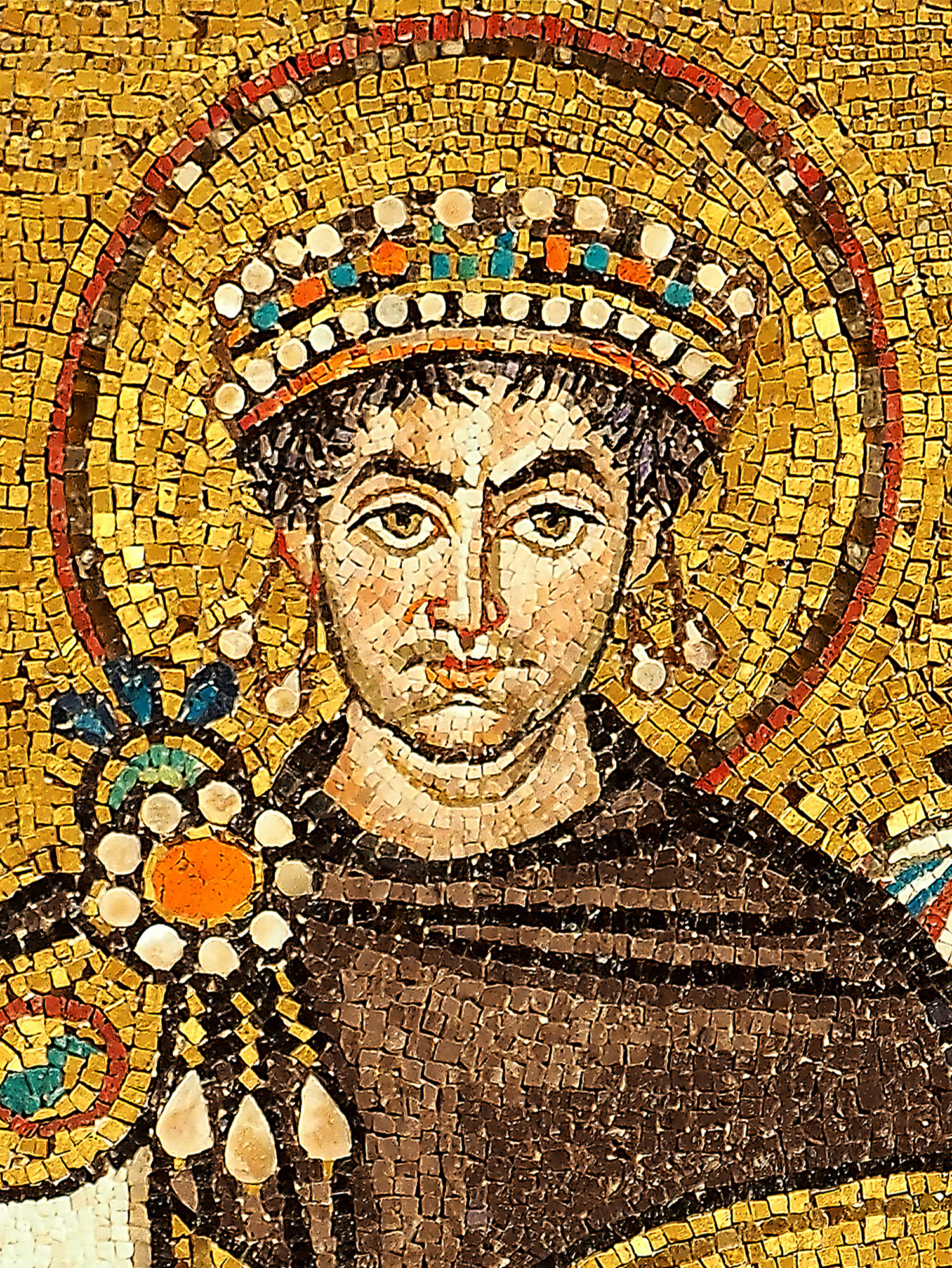
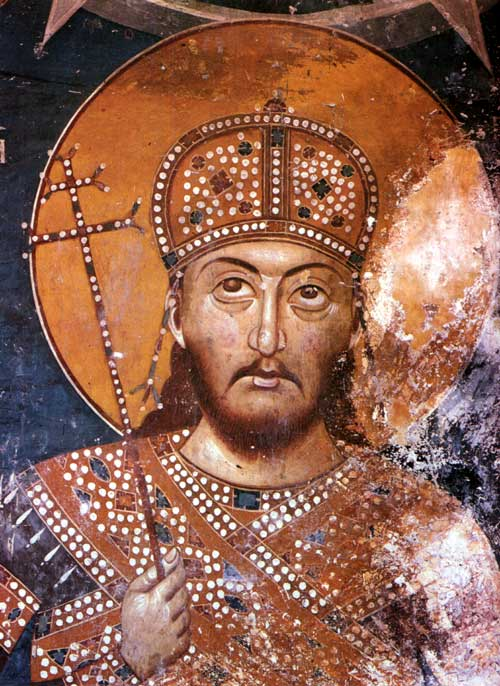
Left: Roman Emperor Justinian
Right: Stefan Dušan, Serbian Emperor

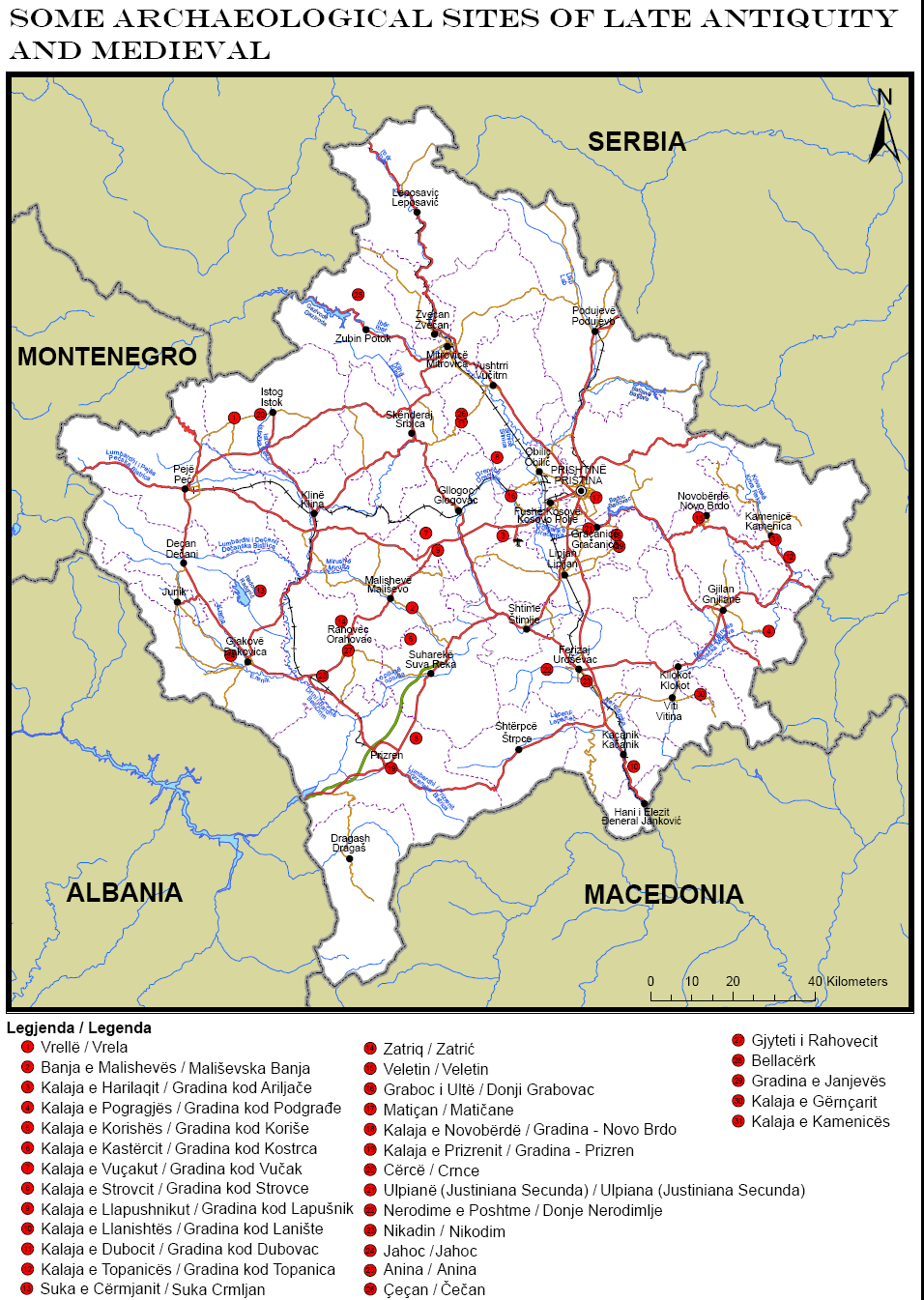
Forts and settlements in late antiquity and medieval Kosovo

Prizren has been traditionally identified with Theranda, a town of the Roman era. Another location which may have been that of Theranda is present-day Suhareka Archaeological research has shown that the site of the fortress has passed several eras of habitation since prehistoric times. In its lower part, material from the upper part of the fort has been deposited over the centuries. It dates from the Bronze Age (c. 2000 BCE) to the late Iron Age (c. 1st century CE) and is comparable to the material found in the nearby prehistoric site in the village of Vlashnjë. In late antiquity, the fortification saw a phase of reconstruction. It is part of a series of forts that were built or reconstructed in the same period by Justinian along the White Drin in northern Albania and western Kosovo in the routes that linked the coastal areas with the Kosovo valley. At this time, the Prizren fortress likely appears in historical record as Petrizen in the 6th century CE in the work of Procopius as one of the fortifications which Justinian commissioned to be reconstructed in Dardania.

Present-day Prizren is first mentioned in 1019 at the time of Basil II (r. 976–1025) in the form of Prisdriana.In 1072, the leaders of the Bulgarian Uprising of Georgi Voiteh traveled from their center in Skopje in the area of Prizren and held a meeting in which they invited Mihailo Vojislavljević of Duklja to send them assistance. Mihailo sent his son, Constantine Bodin with 300 of his soldiers. Dalassenos Doukas, dux of Bulgaria was sent against the combined forced but was defeated near Prizren, which was extensively plundered by the Serbian army after the battle. The Bulgarian magnates proclaimed Bodin "Emperor of the Bulgarians" after this initial victory. They were defeated by Nikephoros Bryennios in the area of northern Macedonia by the end of 1072. Demetrios Chomatenos is the last Byzantine archbishop of Ohrid to include Prizren in his jurisdiction until 1219. Stefan Nemanja had seized the surrounding area along the White Drin in 1185–95 and the ecclesiastical split from the Patriarchate in 1219 was the final act of establishing Nemanjić rule in the town. Prizren and its fort were the administrative and economic center of the župa of Podrimlje (in Albanian, Podrima or Anadrini).

In the Middle Ages, the Prizren fortress was part of the fortifications of the Via de Zenta trade route which passed through the Drin valley and connected the Adriatic coastline with the central Balkans. In a nearby location, roughly 3 km to the southeast of the Prizren fortress, Stefan Dušan commissioned the building of the Monastery of the Holy Archangels and the Višegrad fort, which is also known as Dušanov grad. For a time, they were the fortifications of his court in Prizren before he moved it to Skopje. The város (nënkalaja - old town) of Prizren developed around the fortress. Ragusan traders were stationed in the old town. Prizren over time became a trading hub and gateway for Ragusan trade towards eastern Kosovo and beyond.

Prizren became part of the Ottoman Empire after 1450 until the First Balkan War (1912). The present-day fortress is largely the product of Ottoman expansion and reconstruction in the 18th century.

During the Ottoman occupation of Serbia, Serbs held social gatherings at several monumental places, such as Kaljaja, where they danced the Kolo in the evening.

== Gallery ==
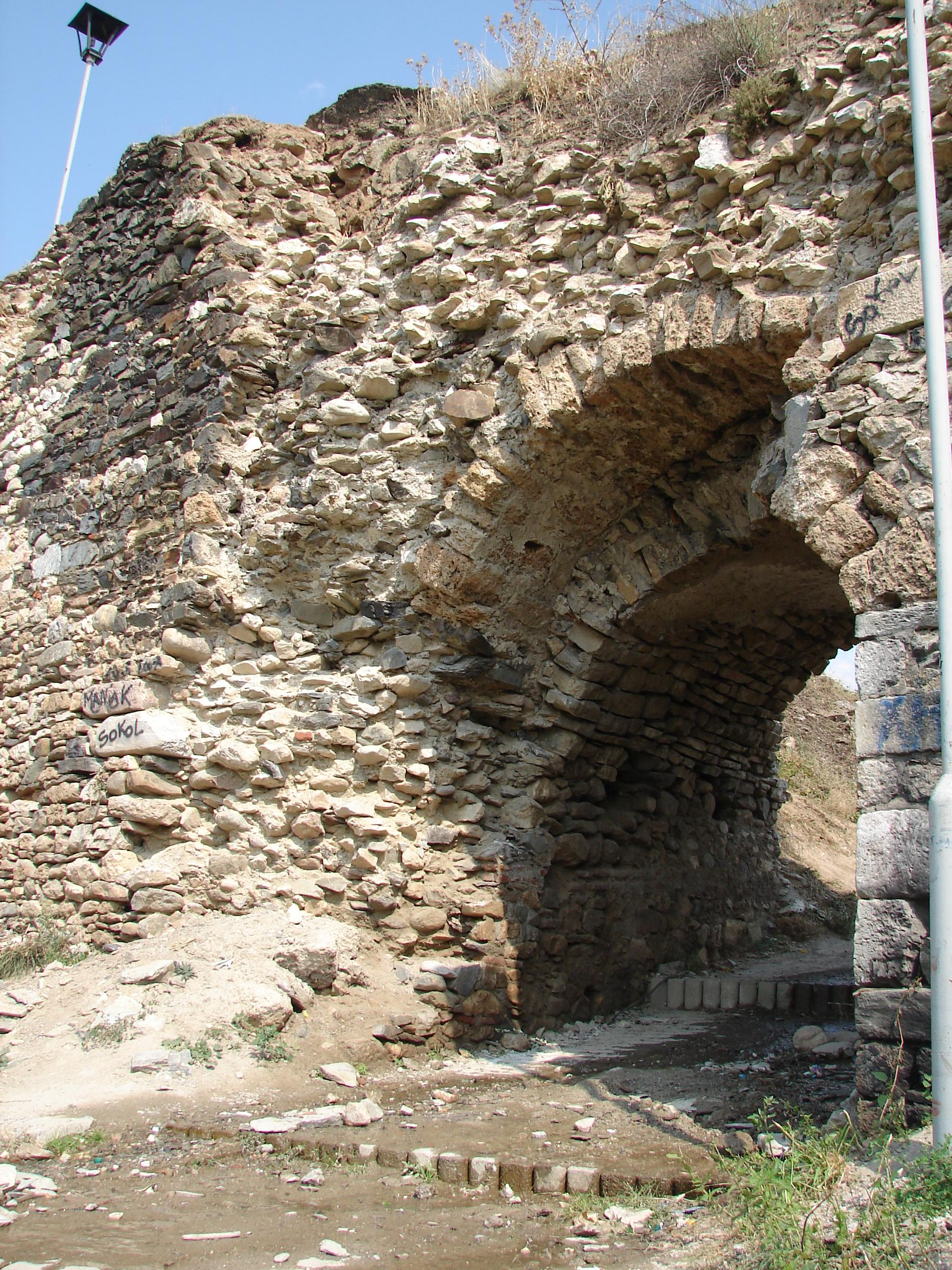
Main Gate

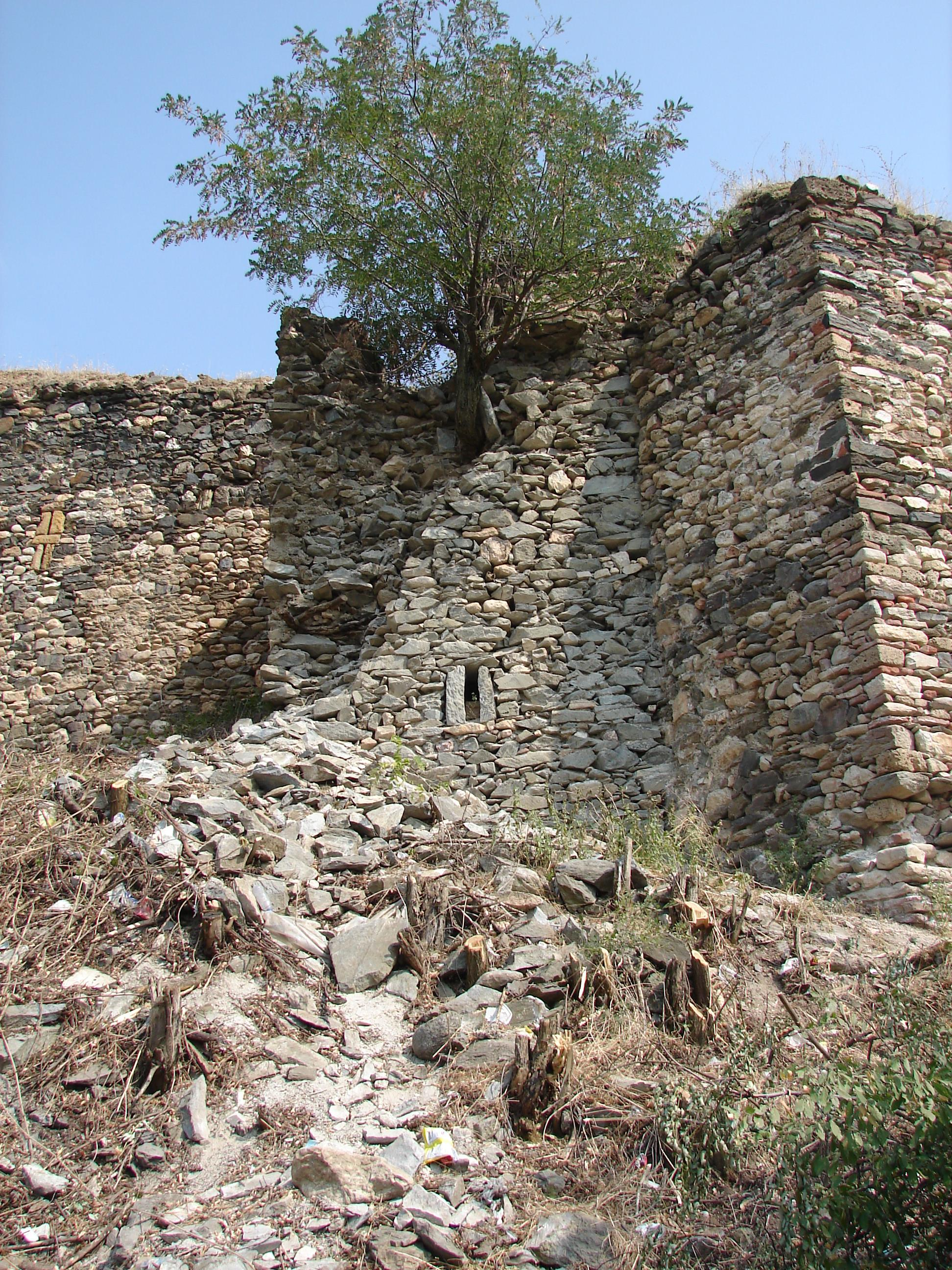
The remains of one of the towers

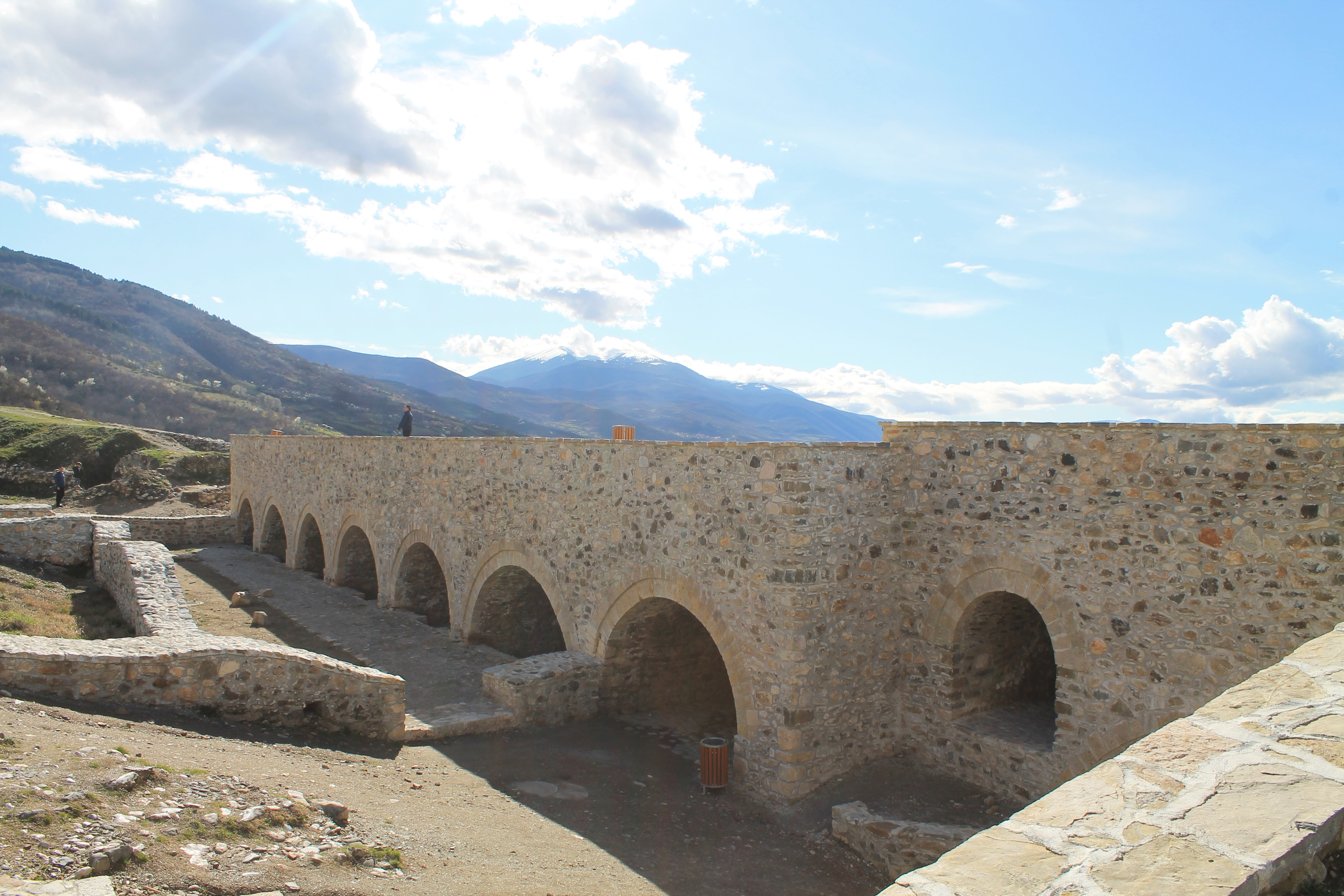
Part of the - now reconstructed - upper part of the fortress

== See also ==
- Late Antiquity and Medieval sites in Kosovo
- List of fortresses in Kosovo
- Tourism in Kosovo

== Sources ==
- Galaty, Michael; Lafe, Ols; Lee, Wayne; Tafilica, Zamir (2013). Light and Shadow: Isolation and Interaction in the Shala Valley of Northern Albania. The Cotsen Institute of Archaeology Press. ISBN 1931745714.
- Gjinolli, Ilir; Bytyçi, Arta (2017). "The Fountain Square –'Shadervan'– A living Landmark of Prizren" (PDF). International Journal of Contemporary Architecture ”The New ARCH“. 4 (1): 10.14621/tna.20170108.
- McGeer, Eric (2019). Byzantium in the Time of Troubles: The Continuation of the Chronicle of John Skylitzes (1057–1079). BRILL. ISBN 9004419403.
- Hoxha, Gëzim (2007). "Të dhëna të reja arkeologjike nga Kalaja e Prizrenit / Nouvelles données archéologiques sur la forteresse de Prizren". Iliria: 33. doi:10.3406/iliri.2007.1073.
- Prinzing, Günter (2008). "Demetrios Chomatenos, Zu seinem Leben und Wirken". Demetrii Chomateni Ponemata diaphora: [Das Aktencorpus des Ohrider Erzbischofs Demetrios. Einleitung, kritischer Text und Indices]. Walter de Gruyter. ISBN 3110204509.
- Perica, Vjekoslav (1998). Religious Revival and Ethnic Mobilization in Communist Yugoslavia, 1965–1991: A History of the Yugoslav Religious Question from the Reform Era to the Civil War. University of Minnesota.
- Stojkovski, Boris (2020). "Byzantine military campaigns against Serbian lands and Hungary in the second half of the eleventh century.". In Theotokis, Georgios; Meško, Marek (eds.). War in Eleventh-Century Byzantium. Routledge. ISBN 0429574770.
- Rrezja, Agon (2011). "Zhupa e Podrimës sipas burimeve cirilike të shek. XII-XV / District of Podrima according to Cyrillic sources of the 12th-15th centuries". Gjurmime Albanologjike. 41–42. Albanological Institute of Pristina.
