= Marash Maple =

Maple tree in Kosovo

- Rrapi i Marashit
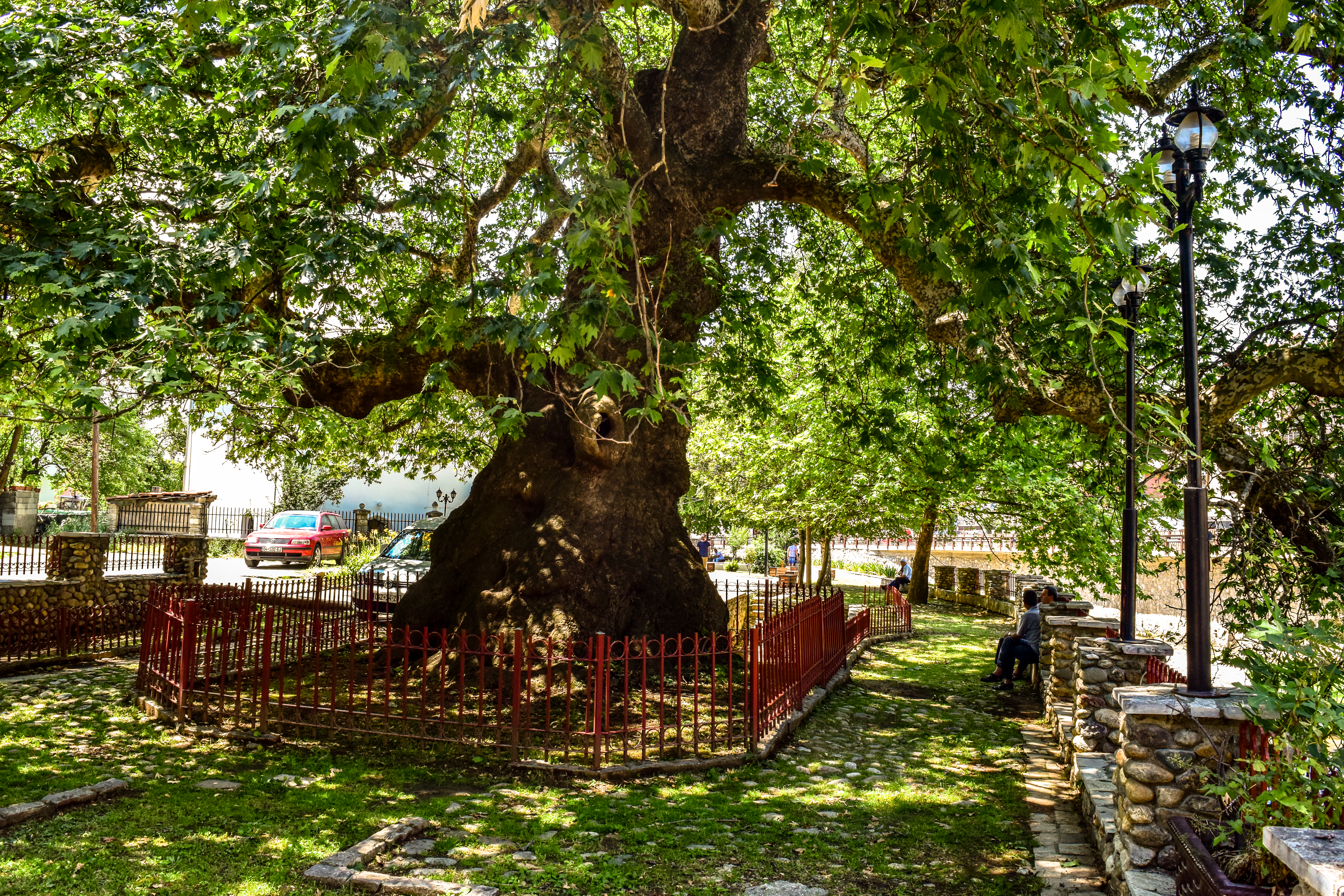
- Interactive map of Marash Maple
- Location: Prizren, Kosovo
- Area: 0.05 ha (0.12 acres)
- Established: 1959

The Marash Maple is a natural monument in Marash Park in Prizren, Kosovo.

== History ==
A maple tree stands in Marash Park along the Prizren Bistrica. In the Marash neighborhood nearby there was once a khanqah or Sufi monastery known locally as a tekke, whose founder is said to have planted the tree. The tree was legally protected in 1959 and is scientifically estimated to be over 400 years old (though legends stretch the age to 500 years). The Marash maple is 20.9 metres (69 ft) with a crown 12 metres (39 ft) in diameter, a trunk 3 metres (9.8 ft) in circumference at the base, and leaves 13 centimetres (5.1 in) to 14 centimetres (5.5 in) long. The tree lies 417 metres (1,368 ft) above sea level.
