= Višegrad (Bistrički) =

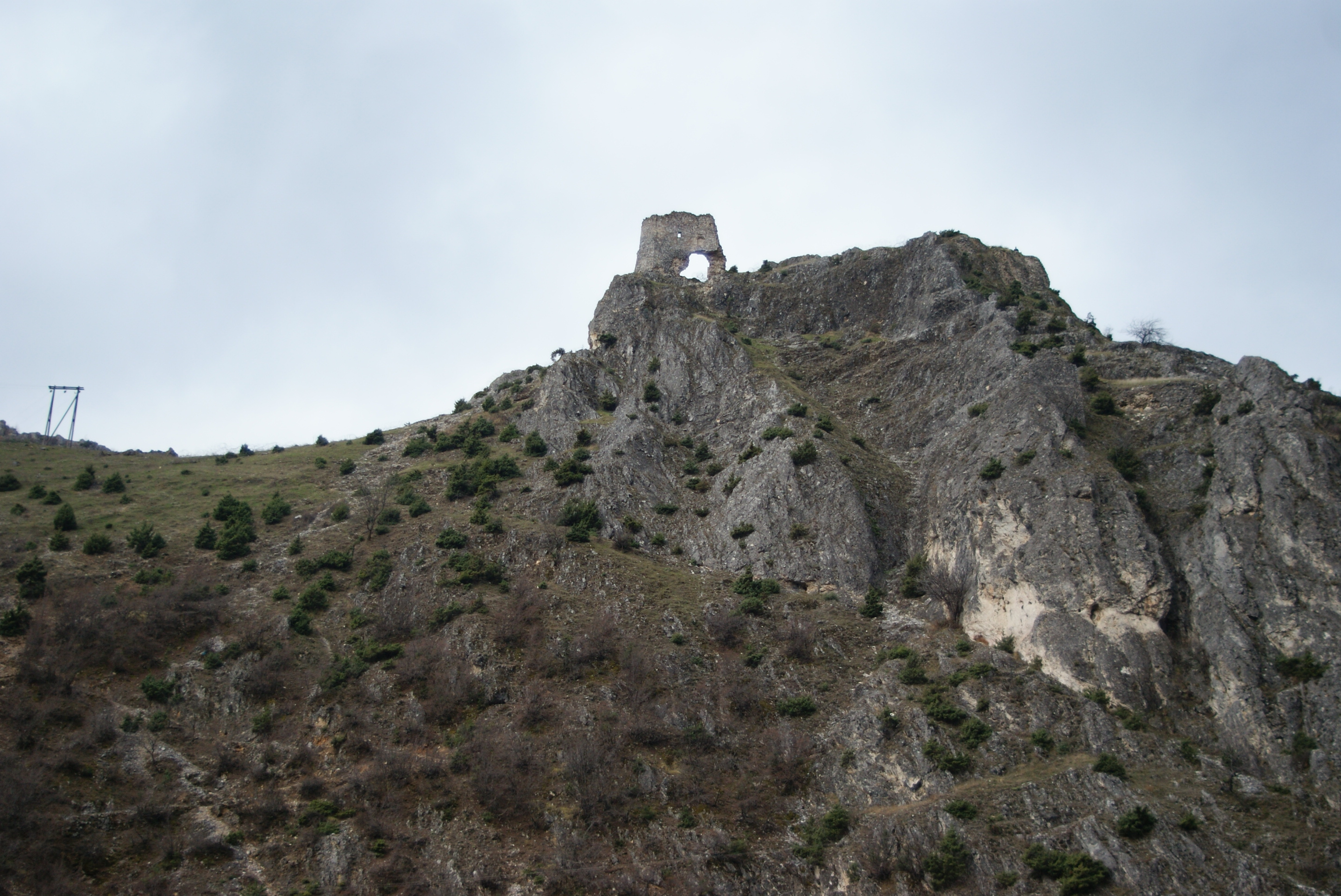
The Upper Town

Višegrad (Serbian Cyrillic: Вишеград, Albanian: Vishegrad), or Prizrenac (Serbian Cyrillic: Призренац), is a fortress located 2 km southeast of Prizren in the Bistrica gorge. It was constructed in the mid 14th century and is on the list of monuments of the Serbian Academy of Arts and Sciences, as well as the cultural monuments of Kosovo. It is currently in ruins.

== Description ==
The Serbian Emperor Dušan (king 1331–1346, emperor 1346–1355) built Višegrad to overlook the Monastery of the Holy Archangels and the castle was intended to protect it. The fortress consists of two parts:

- Upper Town, at the top of the gorge (about 680 m)
- Lower Town, next to Bistrica itself (about 525 m)

The walls are composed of 4 towers, and a 5th which served as a dungeon. Within the citadel are the remains of the Church of Saint Nicholas.

== See also ==
- Prizren Fortress
- List of fortresses in Kosovo
