= Prizrenasja Hydro Power Plant Museum =

Cultural heritage monument of Prizren, Kosovo

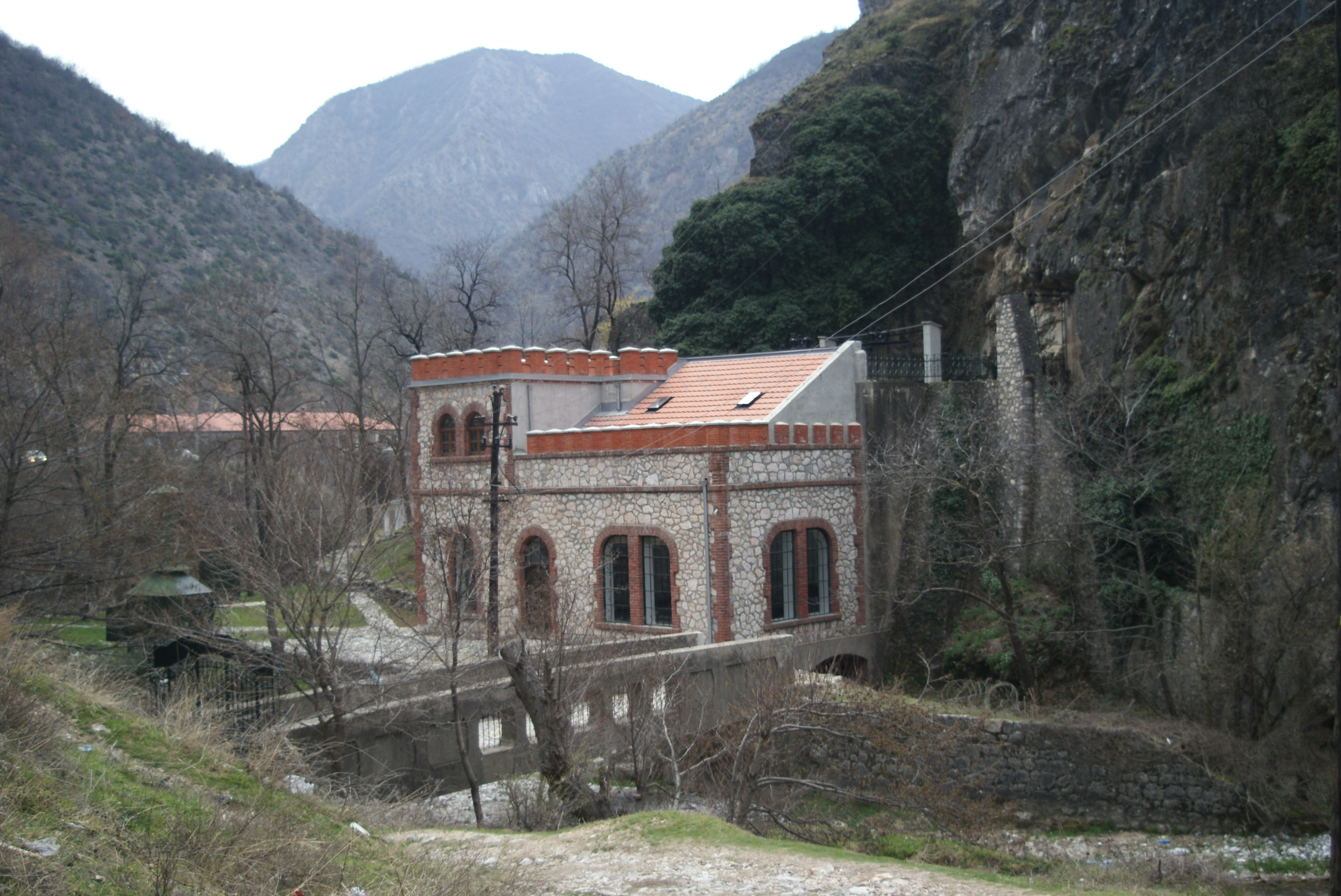
Prizenasja Hydro Power Plant Museum in Prizren

Prizrenasja Hydro Power Plant Museum (Albanian: Muzeu i Elektroekonomisë - Hidroelektrana "Prizrenasja") is located on the Lumbardh River mouth 2.5 km (1.6 mi) from Prizren, Kosovo. It was built in 1929 as the first electric power plant in Kosovo. It supplied the town with electricity for 44 years, until 1 November 1973. On 8 November 1979 it opened as the Electrical Museum of Kosovo, exhibiting many original materials and photographs that reflect the development of the electrical economy in Kosovo.

== See also ==
- List of monuments in Prizren
