= Monastery of the Holy Archangels =

Serbian Orthodox monastery near Prizren, Kosovo

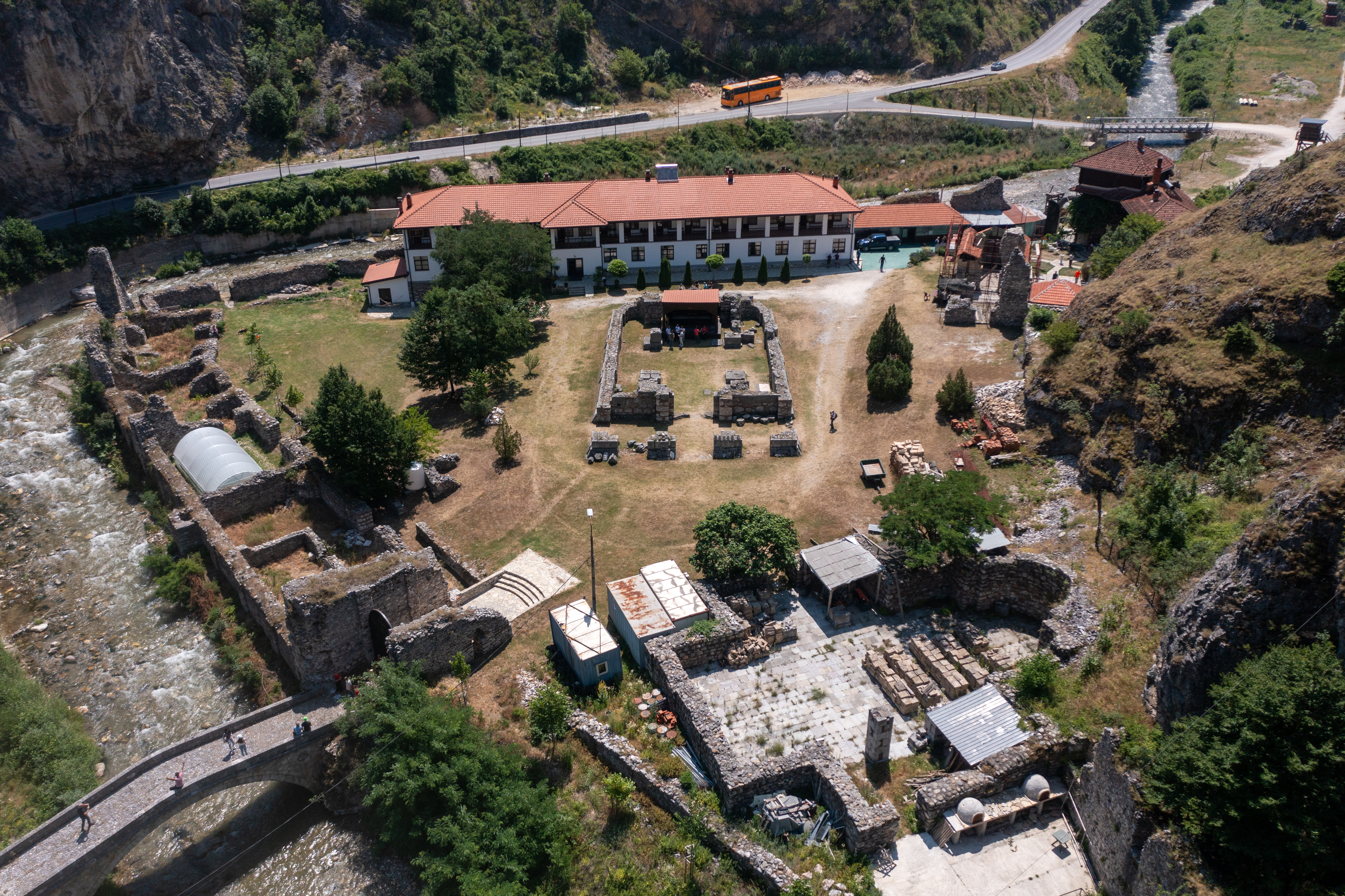
- Overview of the Monastery of the Holy Archangels

- Location within Kosovo

Monastery information
- Full name: Monastery of the Holy Archangels
- Other names: Holy Archangels; Monastery of the St. Archangels
- Order: Serbian Orthodox Church
- Established: 1352 (reestablished in 1998)
- Disestablished: 1615
- Dedication: Saint Archangels
- Diocese: Eparchy of Raška and Prizren

People
- Founders: Stefan Uroš IV Dušan of Serbia, Serbian Emperor

Architecture
- Heritage designation: Monuments of Culture of Exceptional Importance

Site
- Location: Near Prizren, Kosovo
- Coordinates: 42°12′1″N 20°45′49″E
- Visible remains: Reconstructed Abbot's Lodge, remains of the churches of St. Nicolas, and Saint Archangels, remains of the monumental refectory, parts of the entry tower, and reconstructed medieval bridge over the Prizren Bistrica river.
- Public access: Everyone

The Monastery of the Holy Archangels (Serbian: Манастир Светих Архангела, romanized: Manastir Svetih Arhangela; Albanian: Manastiri i Arkangjelit të Shenjtë) is a Serbian Orthodox monastery located in Prizren, Kosovo. The monastery was founded by the Serbian Emperor Stefan Dušan (reigned 1331–1355) between 1343 and 1352 on the site of an earlier church, part of the Višegrad fortress complex. It was the burial church for Emperor Dušan, and represented the culmination of the Serbian ecclesiastical architectural style, that led to the birth of the Morava school style.

The complex, which ranges over 6,500 m², includes two churches, the main one is dedicated to the Holy Archangels (where Dušan's tomb lied), and the second one is dedicated to St. Nicholas, both built in the Rascian architectural style. The monastery was looted and destroyed after the Ottomans arrived in 1455.

The entire complex was archeologically explored in 1927, and its remains were conserved after the Second World War. During the last decade of the 20th century, work on the reconstruction was continued, and in 1998 it again became an active male monastery. After the 1999 NATO bombing of Yugoslavia and retreat of the Yugoslav army forces, reconstructed objects were burned and looted in June 1999, by members of the Kosovo Liberation Army (KLA), after the Kosovo Force (KFOR) arrived. During the 2004 unrest in Kosovo, the monastery was burned and looted again. The entire monastery complex is under protection of the Republic of Serbia, as a Monument of Culture of Great Importance. One priest lives in the monastery which is under the constant protection of Kosovo police in a special protection zone.

== Location ==
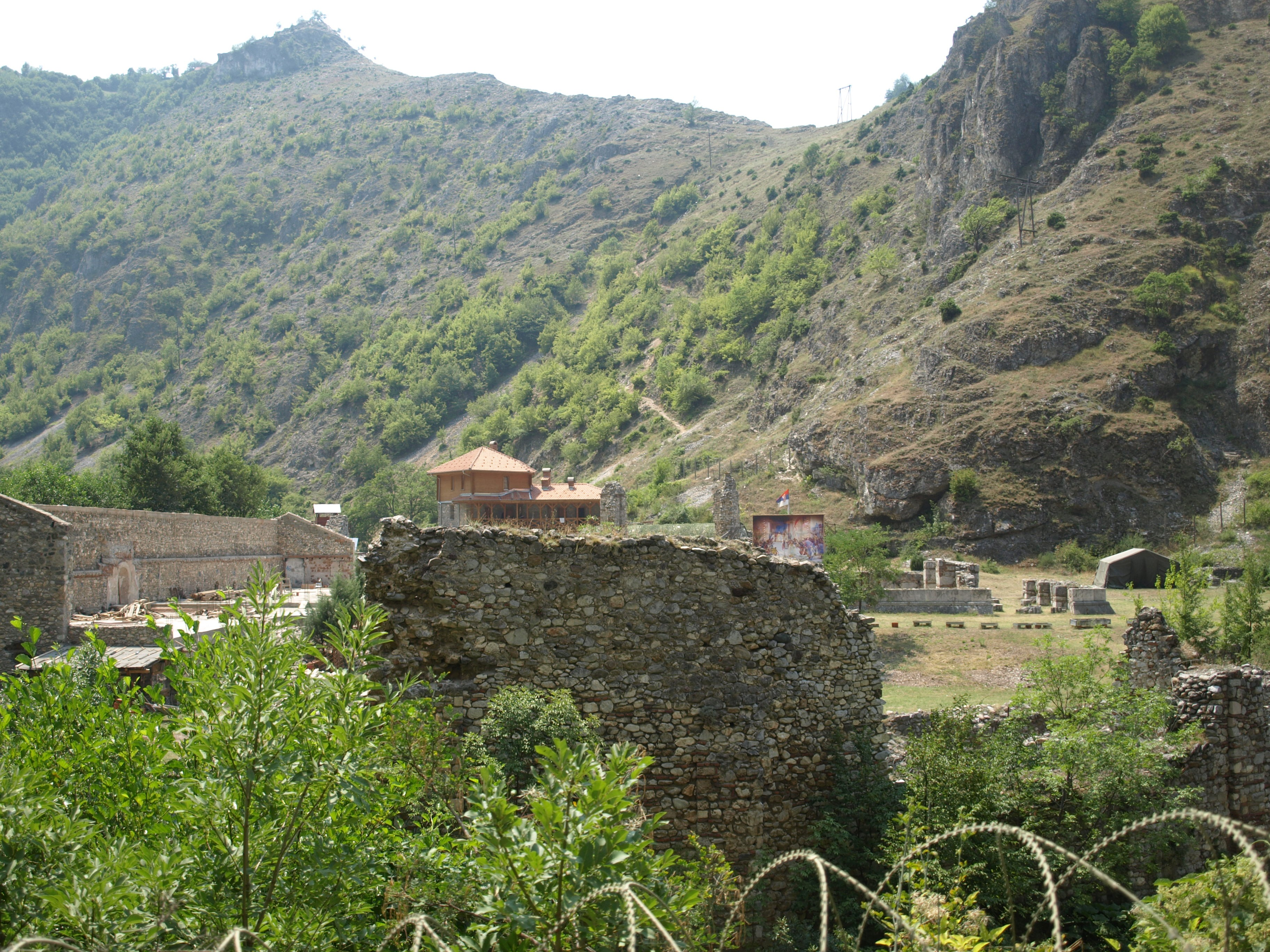
Complex of the monastery

The monastery complex is built in the smaller plateau in the Prizren Bistrica canyon, approximately 2.5 km southeast of Prizren. The plateau is in a peninsula, surrounded by the river from the three sides, while on the fourth southeastern side it is surrounded by sharp rocks, on top of which is the fortified citadel of Višegrad. At the time of its construction there was a caravan road nearby the Prizren Bistrica, which connected Skopje with Prizren (then capital of Serbia), over Kaçanik, Sirinićka Župa and Sredačka Župa, and it is likely that the road was passing right through the monastery.

== History ==
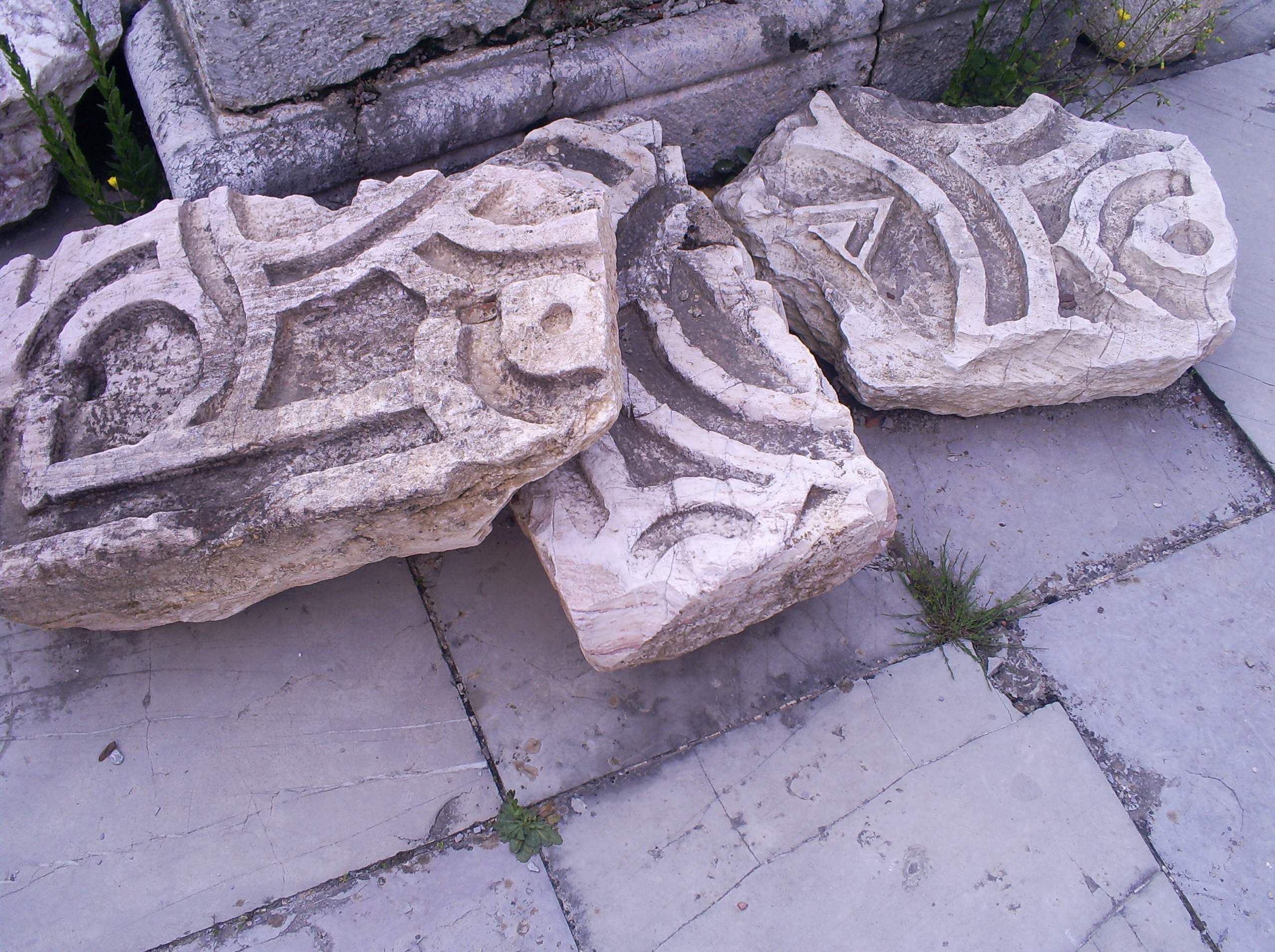
Stone fragments

=== Prehistory of the complex ===
During archeological excavation of the monastery complex, the oldest findings are dated from the Eneolithic age, while it is evident that in the early Iron Age there was a settlement. During classical period, settlement was disbanded, and later during the 4th, 5th and 6th centuries was again founded and it was late classical period or early Byzantine village, which was surrounded by a late antique wall, but that still has not been scientifically confirmed.

After this period, there are findings from the 10th, 11th and 12th centuries, when it is considered that the original medieval fortress (which then included only the five-cornered citadel on the hill above the monastery) was built in the 12th century. Dušan's grandfather, King Milutin (1282–1321), donated a small fort of Višegrad with a church dedicated to Saint Nicholas, Bishop of Prizren. It was donated as a refuge in case of war, as, later, Maglič was a shelter of the Serbian archbishop from Žiča. Later, Dušan gave three villages to a bishop of Prizren in return from the fortress of Višegrad, which was subsequently submitted to a monastery, connecting them into a whole with a defensive wall.

=== Foundation and early history ===
The Monastery was the pious endowment of Emperor Dušan, built at the site of an older church dedicated to the Holy Archangels, that had been known for its miraculous powers. Metropolitan Jacob (Jakov Serski) was responsible for the construction of the monastery, which began planning in 1343, according to Dušan's St. Peter of Koriša-charter dated 19 May the same year. After Dušan's recovery from a serious illness, he decided to raise the Monastery on this site, as a place of healing and in gratitude to Christ and the Archangels Michael and Gabriel. It was consecrated in the fall of 1347, as Dušan prepared a trip on 1 August to attend the consecration, and in December he was at Mount Athos. The church construction began in 1348, supervised by Metropolitan Jacob, who later became a bishop in Serres. The main work was finished early in 1348, as known from a letter from a Venetian merchant from Trepča, dated 24 March 1348, where he complained that he could not sell the lead from the Trepča mine, since the head of the mine received direct order that he, by the cost of his life, could not sell lead to anyone, except the abbot of the Monastery to cover the roof. The founding charter accompanied the Dušan's Code, upon its promulgation at a state council on May 21, 1349, in Skopje. It is believed that the construction of the monastery church, supporting facilities and protective walls ended in 1352, and at the time of its establishment, it housed some 200 monks and the Metropolitan.

In the founding charter, Dushan gave to the monastery tax farming rights over 93 villages, 7 churches and their congregation and property (fertile land, vineyards, and oil-lamps), an iron mine in Toplica, 467 Vlach households (shepherds), 8 Albanian katund, and a number of craftsmen, including goldsmiths. The households and communities which were to pay taxes to the monastery lived in an area that stretched from the Šar Mountains to the Adriatic Sea. Although the number of granted villages were less than those of King Milutin to his endowment at Banjska, the Archangels' Monastery had a territory that was richer and more advanced. The Prizren customs and market's revenue belonged to the Monastery, and cooking oil arrived from Bar and fish from Skadar and Plav, as well as salt, silk, wine, honey and wax. Master builders such as Petros, Vojislav, Srđan, Noš and Vojihna were given to the Monastery, and are believed to have participated in the building of the Monastery.

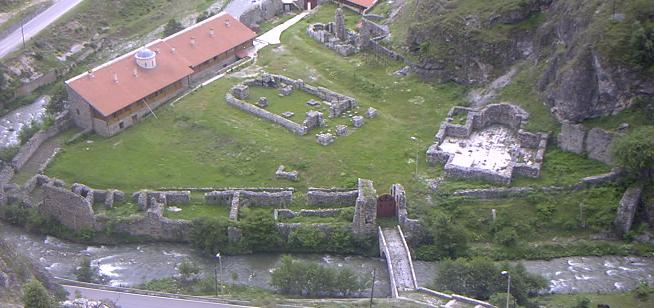
View of the monastery complex from the air: (left above) Part of the renewed dormitory (burned during the 2004 March unrest) (up) remains the church of St. Nicholas (middle) Remains of Church of the Holy Archangel (right) remains a monumental dining (down) remains of the entrance tower and reconstructed stone bridge across the Bistrica

A hospital was also built within the complex. The charter stated the provision of compulsory treatment of sick people.

The Monastery represented the culmination of the Serbian ecclesiastical architectural style that led to the birth of the Morava school style. Inside the complex, which ranges over approximately 6,500 m², are two churches, dedicated to the Holy Archangels (which was Dušan's tomb), and Saint Nicholas, both built in the Rascian architectural style, although, like Visoki Dečani monastery, regarding time of the construction, and some architectural elements, it may belong to the Vardar architectural style.

After his death on 20 December 1355, Emperor Dušan was buried in a separate tomb, located in the southwestern part of the nave of the Church of the Saint Archangels, which is a unique solution of the Serbian architecture. During the fall of the Serbian Empire, the monastery served as a refuge for Ragusan merchants from Prizren, who left town in fear of Nikola Altomanović (1366–1373), and two years later it came to the settlement of the Serbian and Ecumenical Patriarch. Then the grave of Dušan Serbian and Greek priests performed a joint service and remove the Anathema from the Dušan, and the monastery dwelt at one time and Serbian Patriarch Ephraim (1375–1380, 1389–1392). In one Chronicle were mentioned fields from other quarters 15th century and, according to the monastery's church there under the sunstraight to her artistic process and the beauty beyond Church of Christ Pantocrator in Dečani, and especially emphasizes it is covered under the mosaics the highest reach of the Serbian medieval architecture in this field. The same record states that are then discussed to no longer anywhere to be found Pathos of Prizren, Dečani church, Peć narthex, Banjska gold and Resava writings, which are symbolically represented the most significant limits of the Serbian state at the time.

=== Ottoman rule ===
Photo Of monastery from 1927

After the capture of Prizren and its surroundings in 1455 by the Ottoman Empire, the monastery was looted and destroyed. The monastic community did not stop, but the complex had lost its old glory and was in constant decline.

During the following centuries I site was further destroyed the remaining delivery of construction materials for the building, as buildings in the Prizren, and ordinary houses and time are the remains of former buildings buried layers of the country. Nonetheless, the position remained famous monasteries in the surrounding people, so that the entire area to be hit occasionally found robbery from which ruins were dig up in search of hidden treasures of the monastery.

Some of the folk traditions of the monastic treasures are crossing the border fantasy and the other recorded the legend of gemstone that decorated the top of the cross and the central dome. According to her, he sparkled so great, that man could by dark night thirty kilometers to go to North but, to the Švanjski Bridge, which is located at old fort, as in the middle of broad daylight.

The local Serb population gathers twice a year in the monastery ruins in summer (26 June) and autumn (21 November) on monastery Slava day (Holy Archangels). According to one travel writer, the service began during the night and so that only light provided the burning candles, while the people and clergy in the prayer welcomed the dawn.

=== Research during the twentieth century ===
The first archaeological excavations of the site were carried out in 1927 by Dr Radoslav Grujić, with help of the Ministry of Religion and the army and navy. During that research, several objects were detected in the area of the Bistrica:

- The main church dedicated to the Holy Archangels
- A small church dedicated to St. Nicholas
- Part of the dormitory and other buildings along the rampart near the Bistrica

In the area of Višegrad, only a small research was conducted, in which the church dedicated to St. Nicholas and several other buildings were found. Inside the main church they found the remains of the imperial tomb, in which were supposedly the bones of Emperor Dušan. Two years later Dušan's remains were transferred to Belgrade and buried in a separate coffin in the St. Mark's Church, up until the full restoration of the monastery.

The found parts of the famous mosaic flooring, decorative plastic and paintings were transferred to the Museum of Southern Serbia (now Museum of Macedonia) in Skopje, where they are still located, but it is not known where the other artifacts which are mentioned in Grujić's reports are, thus they are today considered permanently lost, In addition, parts of mosaic floor were further damaged during the transport to Skopje.

Shortly before the 1926 excavations, the first Hydroelectric power plant in Kosovo and Metohija, Prizrenka, was built next to the monastery complex, completed in 1928, which was active until the 1960s, while today it is under state protection as a monument.

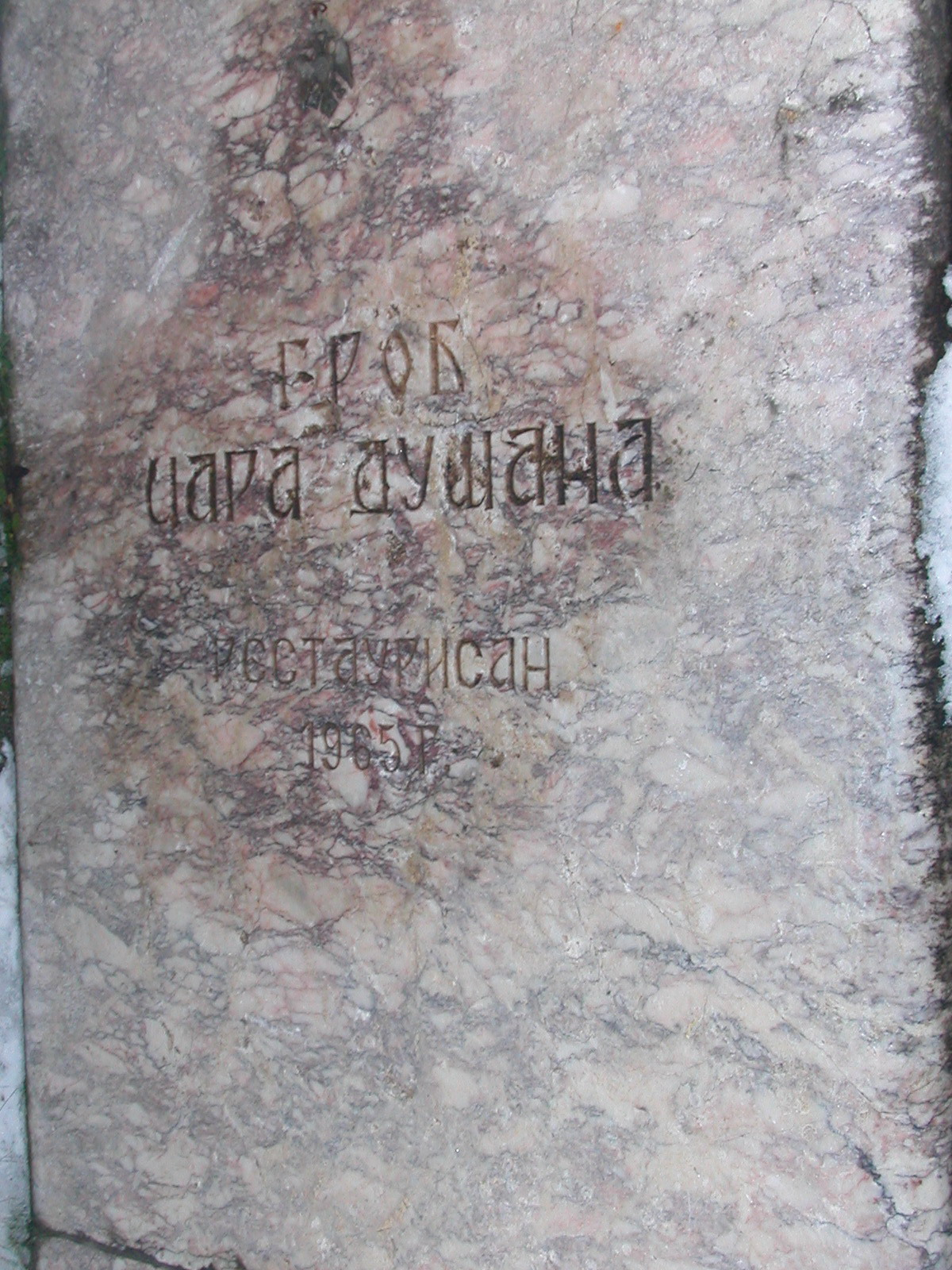
Marble slab on the grave site of Emperor Dušan

After World War II, research on the complex was continued from 1961 to 1965, with parallel conservation work undergone. The research team was headed by Dr Slobodan Nenadović. During this period he researched the eastern and northeastern part of the plateau near the Bistrica river, which revealed most of the dormitory, and the dining room. Upon completion of works, a marble slab was placed on the site of Dušan's tomb. The head of the subsequent research team, Mihailo Milinković, presented serious objections to the methods of research in this period, which in his opinion, were only of the architectural character and were not in accordance with the principles of archaeological practice. In addition, he pointed out that the material were not singled out and preserved, but with the rest of the material thrown into the Bistrica. On the western entrance to the monastery complex, a stone bridge was built in 1968 which connected the monastery plateau with the main road that passes the second bank of the river, and during 1970's work on conservation and restoration were continued.

In early 1990s, an idea about the restoration of the entire monastery complex emerged, for which one of the prerequisites for carrying out was further archaeological research in this area. During the 1992, the excavations were carried out, after which, over the next two years, an extensive systematic protection research was done, led by Dr Milinković.

=== Rehabilitation of spiritual life and attacks on the monastery ===
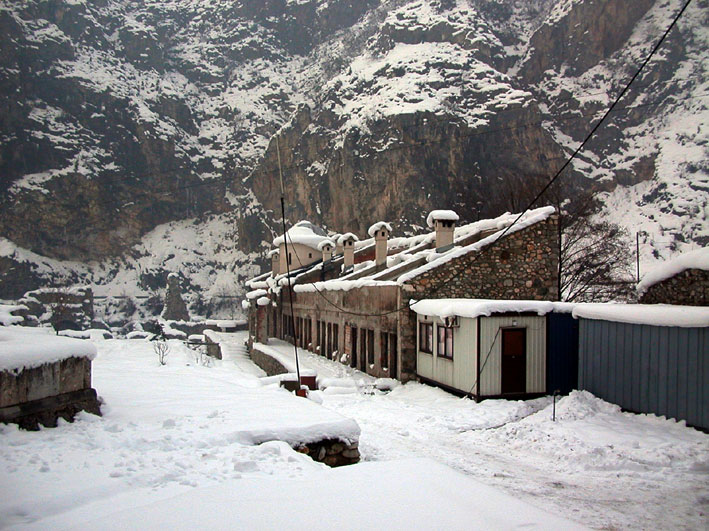
Renewed monastery dormitory burned down during the 2004 unrest in Kosovo and container for housing the monks

Restoration of the monastery guest house with a workshop and a chapel dedicated to St. Nikolaj of Žiča, began in 1995, and the work was completed in 1998 when the monastery again became an active male monastery. Restoration of one dormitory was the beginning of the reconstructional project and its complete conversion to the seat of Eparchy of Raška and Prizren.

The following year, after the NATO bombing of Yugoslavia, Yugoslavia recalled security forces from the southern Serbian province. Only a few days after German KFOR units had been dispatched, members of the Kosovo Liberation Army burned and looted the restored residence, and one of the monks, Father Chariton, was kidnapped in Prizren, in mid-June 1999. His decapitated body was found in the summer of 2000 in Prizren, and he was buried in the Crna Reka monastery, where he had become a monk, while his head was never found. The remaining monastic brotherhood left the monastery after his kidnapping, but returned after a month to bury his remains.

The monastery refectory was restored with the help of local Serbs from Sredska and Sirinić, so that the celebration of the 650th anniversary of the monastery could take place, on 26 July 2002, attended by almost 1,000 Serbs. This milestone was not without incident, since Albanians in Prizren organized protests against their arrival, and a bomb exploded in the fortress of Višegrad.

During the 2004 unrest in Kosovo, the monastery complex was again under attack by Albanian extremists, despite the fact that it was secured by the nearby KFOR base. The entire residence was burned and destroyed, including the bell tower and the woodcut workshop, a panel was badly damaged and the tomb of Emperor Dušan was broken and desecrated. The monastic brotherhood of the Monastery was previously evacuated, but returned in April and continued to live in a tent container that KFOR provided. After that, local Serbs again helped with the restoration, finishing the southeastern part of the dormitory by November the same year.

On 26 July 2005, the celebration of the Monastery Slava (patron saint protector) and the 650th anniversary of the Emperor's death was organized with the protection of KFOR forces. The celebration was attended by hundreds of Serbs, among whom were present church dignitaries and state officials, and the whole celebration was broadcast live by Serbian State Television (RTS).

In addition, a large reproduction of Paja Jovanović's "Crowning of Emperor Dušan", and a Serbian flag were added to the renovated guest house. In May 2007, a published study on reconstruction of the entire monastery complex estimated about 10 years and 8.326 million EUR for the completion of the Monastery.

=== Modern ===
The entire complex was archaeologically explored in 1927, and its remains were conserved after the Second World War. During the last decade of the 20th century work on the reconstruction was continued, and in 1998 it again became an active male monastery. After the 1999 NATO bombing of Yugoslavia and retreat of the Yugoslav army forces, reconstructed objects were burned and looted in June 1999, by members of the Kosovo Liberation Army (KLA), after the Kosovo Force (KFOR) arrived.

During the 2004 unrest in Kosovo, the monastery was burned and looted again. The entire complex is under protection of the Republic of Serbia, as a Monument of Culture of Great Importance. The monastery houses one priest and is under the protection of the Kosovo police in a special protection zone.

== See also ==
- List of Serbian Orthodox monasteries
- Sinaites in Serbia
