= Katip Sinan Qelebi Mosque =

Mosque in Prizren, Kosovo

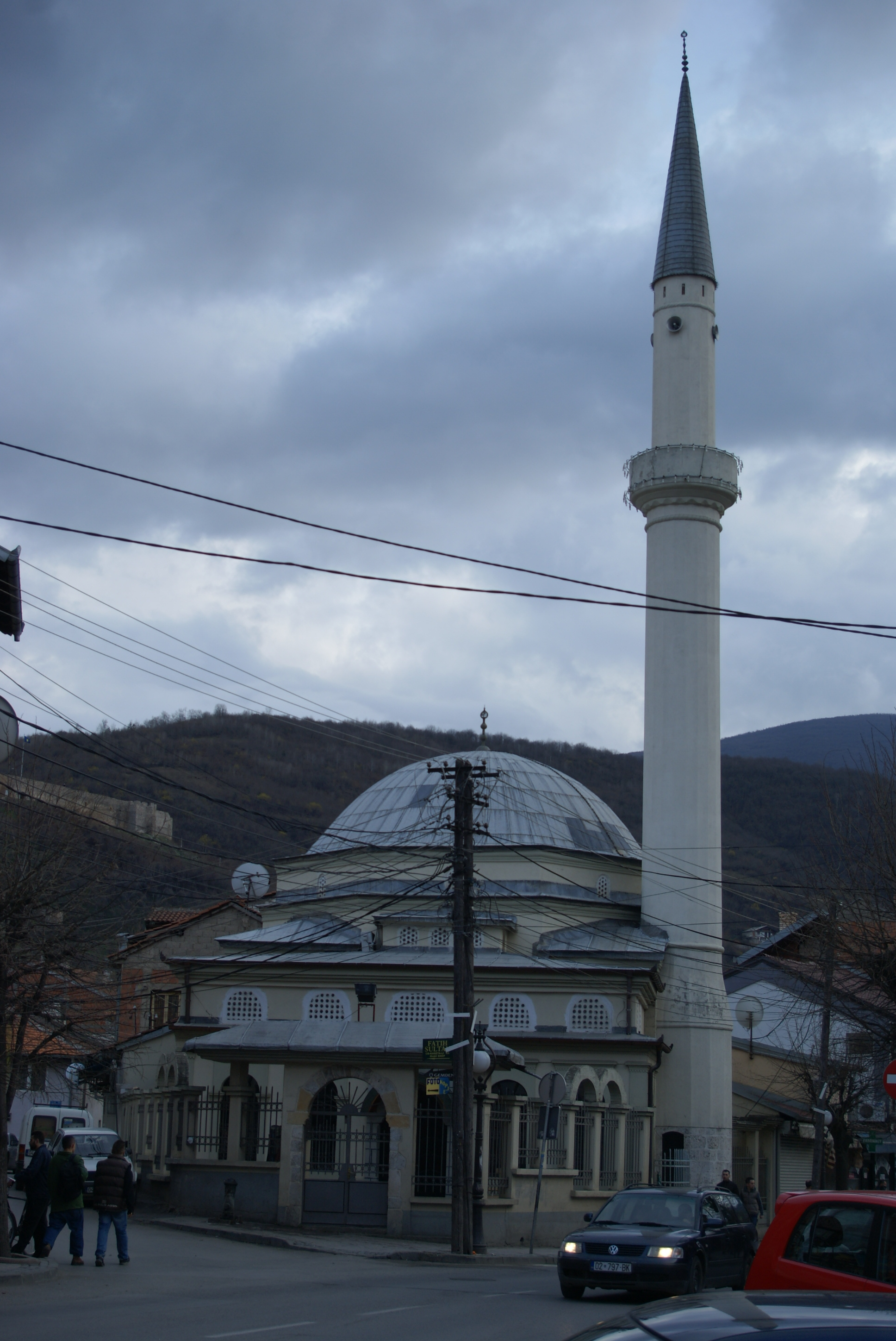

Religion
- Affiliation: Sunni Islam

Location
- Location: Prizren
- Country: Kosovo
- Interactive map of Katip Sinan Qelebi Mosque

Architecture
- Type: mosque
- Established: 1591; 435 years ago

The Mosque Katip Sinan Qelebi (Albanian: Xhamia e Çatip Sinanit), also known as "Katip Çelebi" (Turkish: Sinan Katip Camii), is located on the Adem Jashari Street in Prizren, Kosovo. Katip means "secretary" in Turkish. It may be named after Katip Çelebi but it also may be named like the Plaošnik mosque in Ohrid, which was named after Sinaneddin Yusuf Çelebi, short form Sinan Çelebi, from the Ohrizâde family.

It was supposedly built in 1591. It was repaired in 1893–94 based on an inscription.

== See also ==
- Islam in Kosovo
- Religion in Kosovo
