= Saraç Mosque =

Mosque in Prizren, Kosovo

Coordinates: 42°12′37.1″N 20°44′27.6″E

- Xhamia e Kukli Mehmetbeut (Albanian)
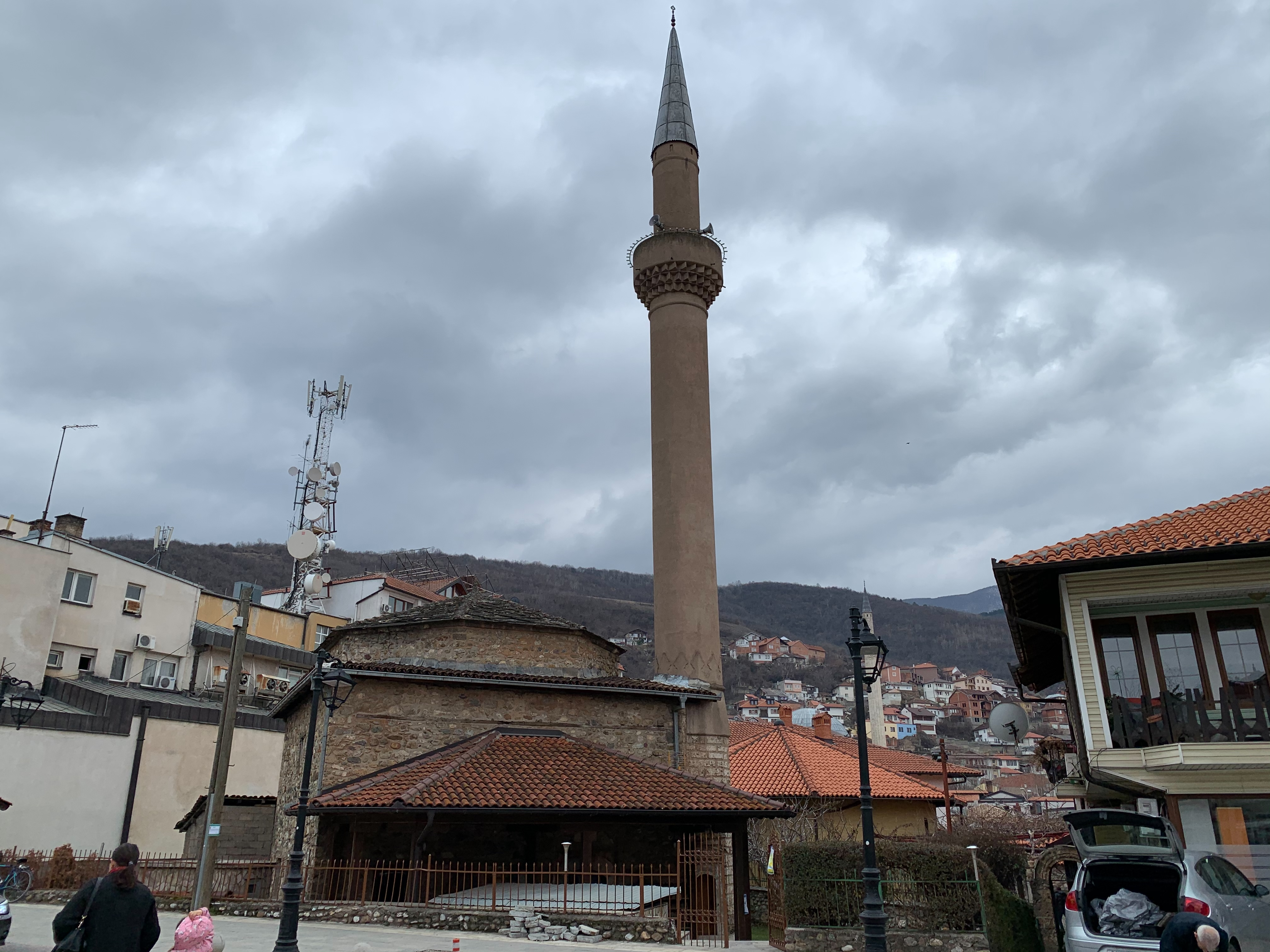
- Interactive map of Saraç Mosque
- Location: Prizren, Kosovo

The Saraç Mosque or Kukli Mehmet Bey Mosque is a cultural heritage monument, one of the oldest mosques not only in Prizren but in all of Kosovo.

== History ==
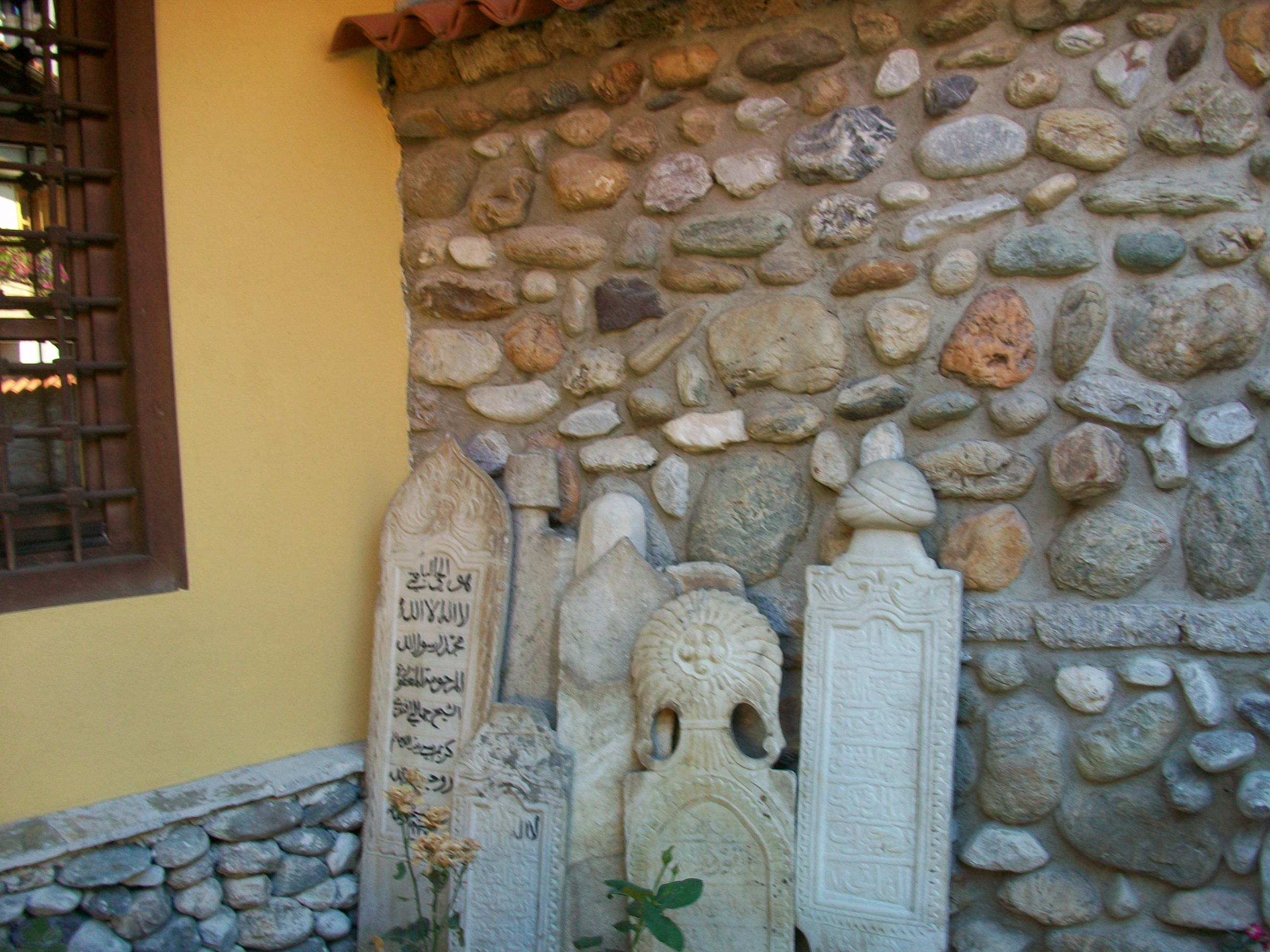
Graveyard

The Kukli Bey Mosque lies near city center in the Saraçhane Quarter, historically known for the tanning and gristmill trades. The mosque is located near the Halveti Teqe and the Gazi Mehmet Pasha Hammam (Ottoman bathhouse). In 1531, it was built by the Albanian Mehmet Kukli Bey of Opoja, then governor of a region stretching from Thessalonica to Bosnia. The southwestern-facing porch was demolished in 1963 during road widening. Renovations in 1977 and 1994 plastered the interior walls and removed the murals, while the stone roof was replaced with clay tile; further renovations were carried out from 2000 to 2003. In 2008, the porch was rebuilt, but the interior burned in an electrical fire in 2009.

== Description ==
The mosque is a 9 x 9 m square built from stone mortared with lime. An externally hexagonal roof originally built from stone slabs is layered above an octagonal interior dome underneath. The façade plaster shows clearly the masonry structure, in which irregular river stones are bound by lime mortar. Wooden hatches connecting the façade to the central structure are also visible, along with an entry door on the southwestern side. The door is wooden with a semi-arched frame of carved stone, and a nearby sign identifies the mihrab. In the southern corner, close to the door, is the hexagonal-based stone minaret, a rounded structure topped by a conical kylah or dome on top of the şerefe or balcony, the latter covered in rich geometric ornamentation.

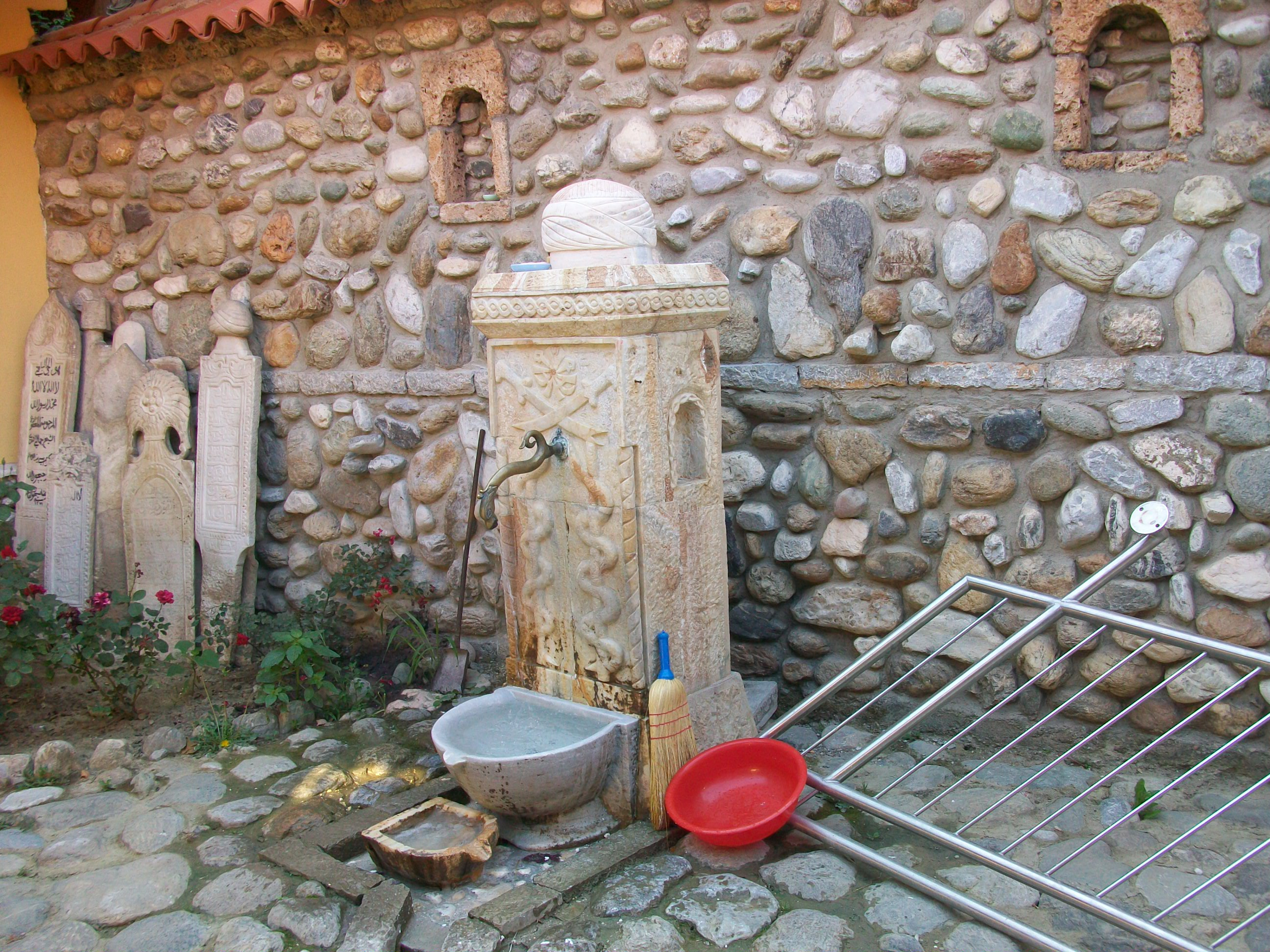
Shadirvan
