= Prevalla =

Prevalla: Prevallë (Albanian); Prevalac (Serbian)
- Village
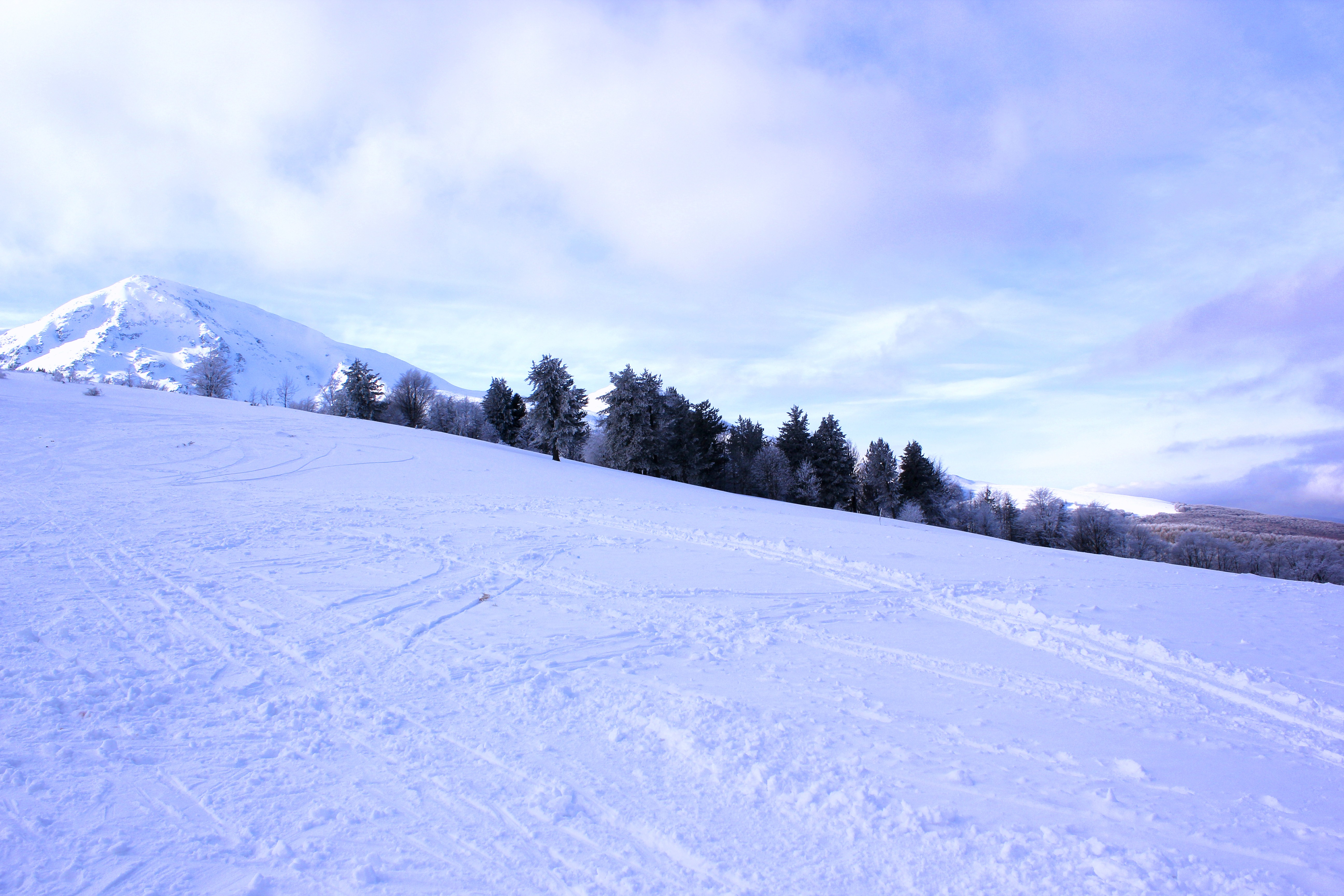
- Prevalla, Prizren, Kosovo
- Interactive map of Prevalla
- Country: Kosovo
- District: Prizren
- Municipality: Prizren
- Elevation: 1,800 m (5,900 ft)
- Time zone: UTC+1 (CET)
  - Summer (DST): UTC+2 (CEST)

Prevalla (Serbian Cyrillic: Превалац) is a ski resort and touristic village which approximately is 30 km (19 mi) away from Prizren, Kosovo and about twelve kilometers from Brezovica, the largest ski center in Kosovo.

== Overview ==
Prevalla is a popular destination for hikers or skiers. The village borders a large forest. During the summer, people go there to relax and rest, whereas during the winter people visit it for its seasonal recreational sports. It lies 1,800 m (5,900 ft) above sea level. Prevalla is located in the south of Kosovo in the Sharr Mountains, in the road leads from Prizren via Prevalla to Shtrpce (Strpce).

The region belongs to the Sharr Mountains National Park.

== Gallery ==
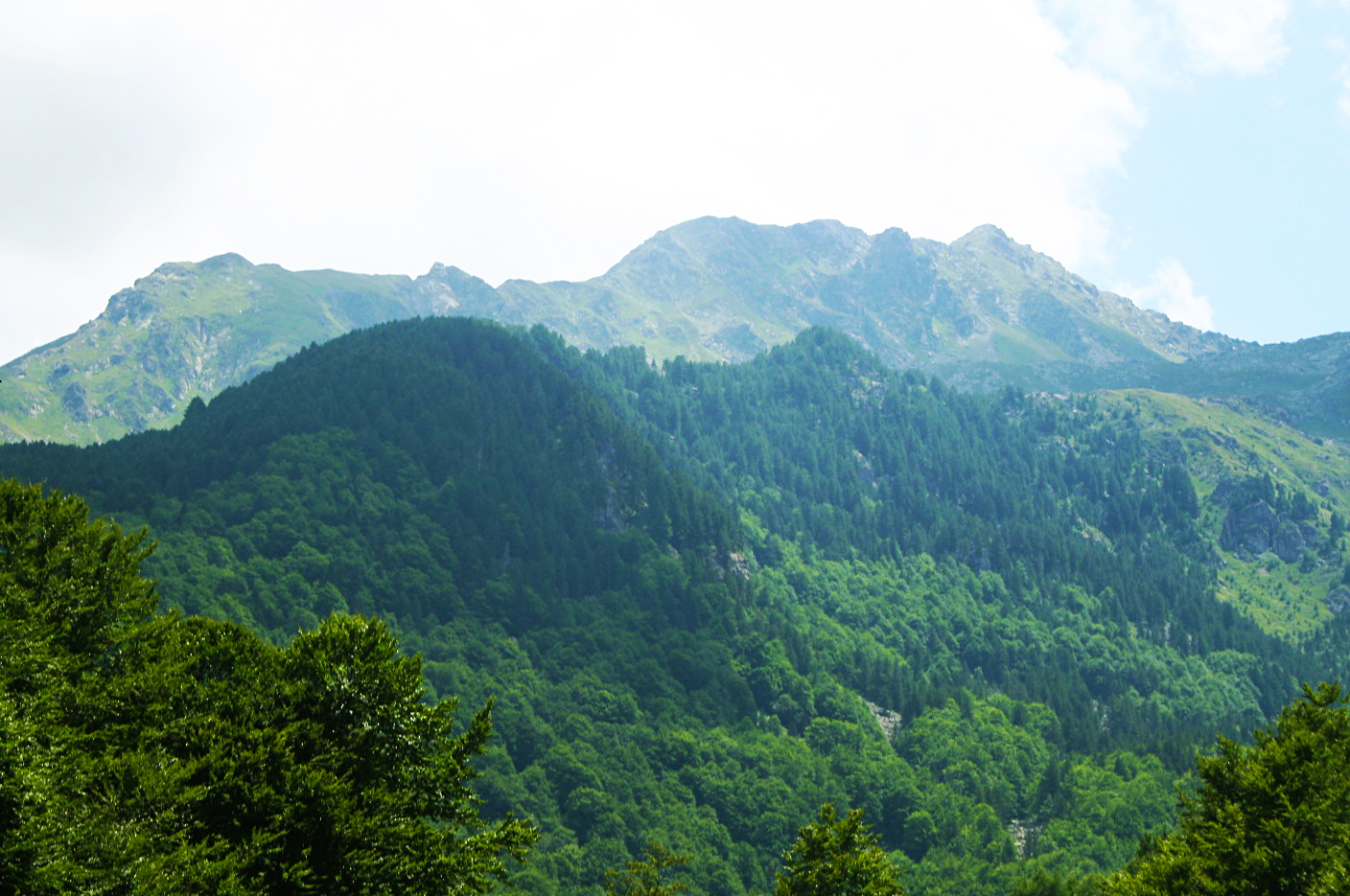
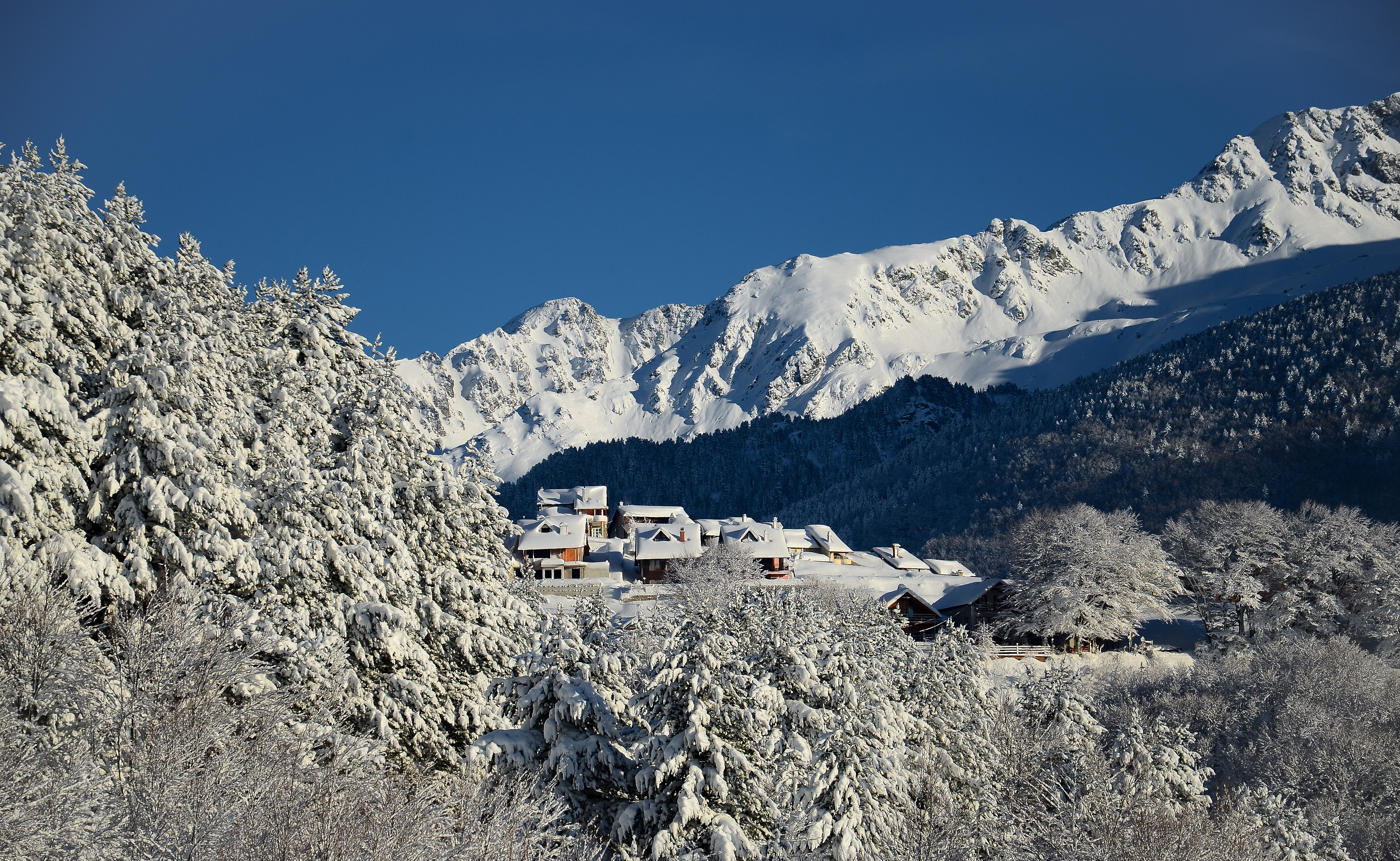
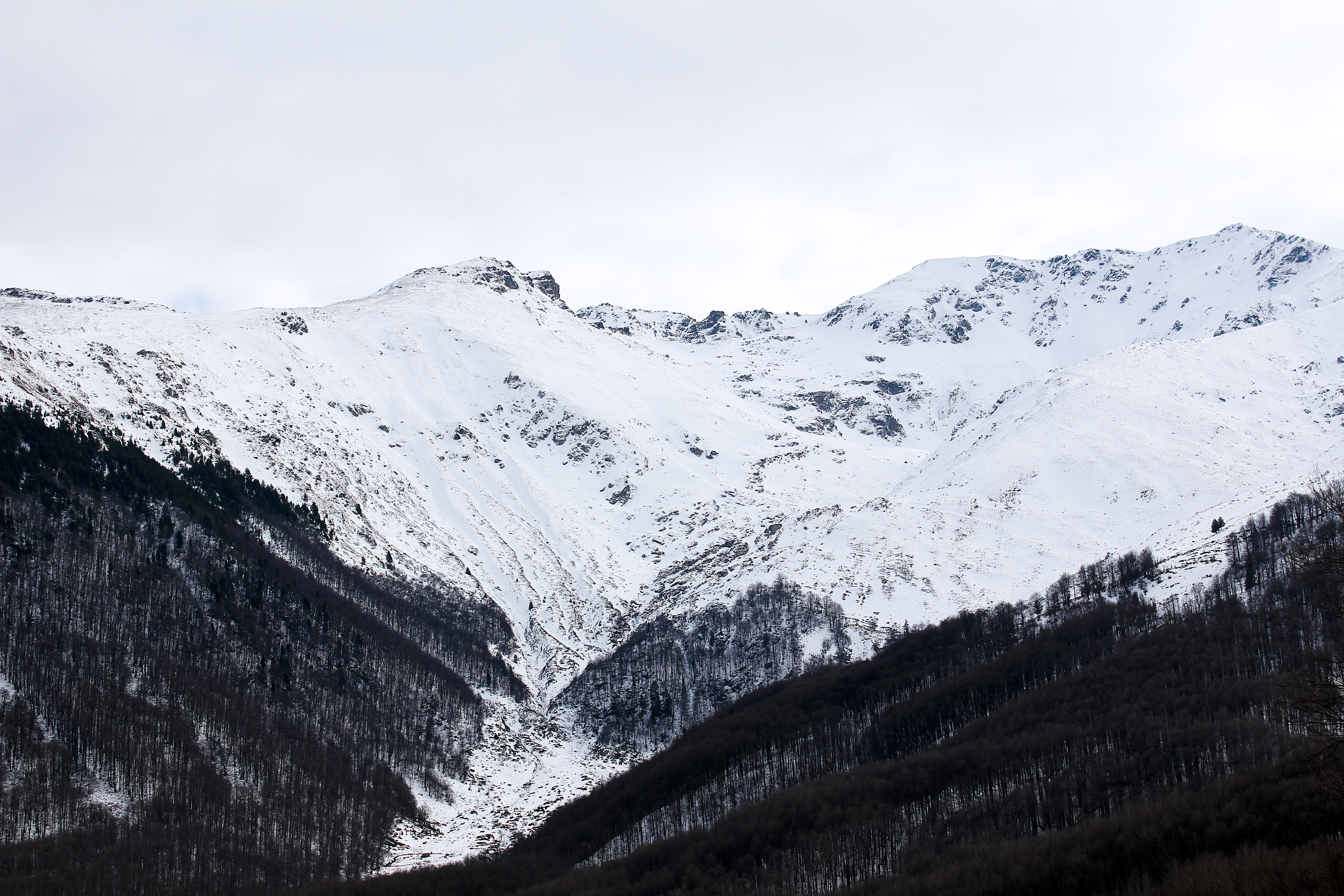
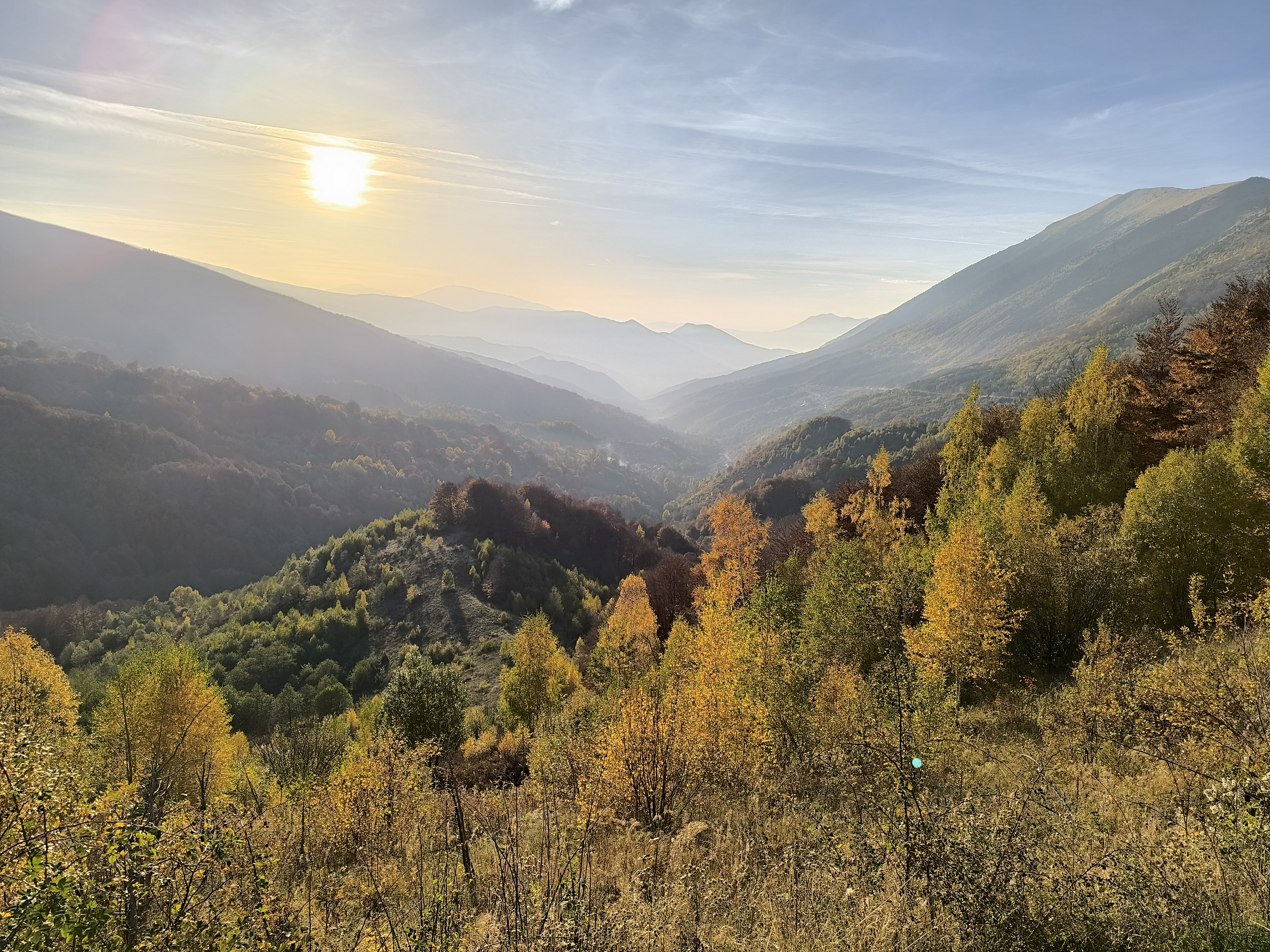
The mountains around the ski resort make it a tourist hotspot.

== See also ==
- List of mountains in Kosovo
- National parks in Kosovo
