= Old Stone Bridge, Prizren =

Old stone bridge in Prizren, Kosovo

Coordinates: 42°12′34″N 20°44′26″E

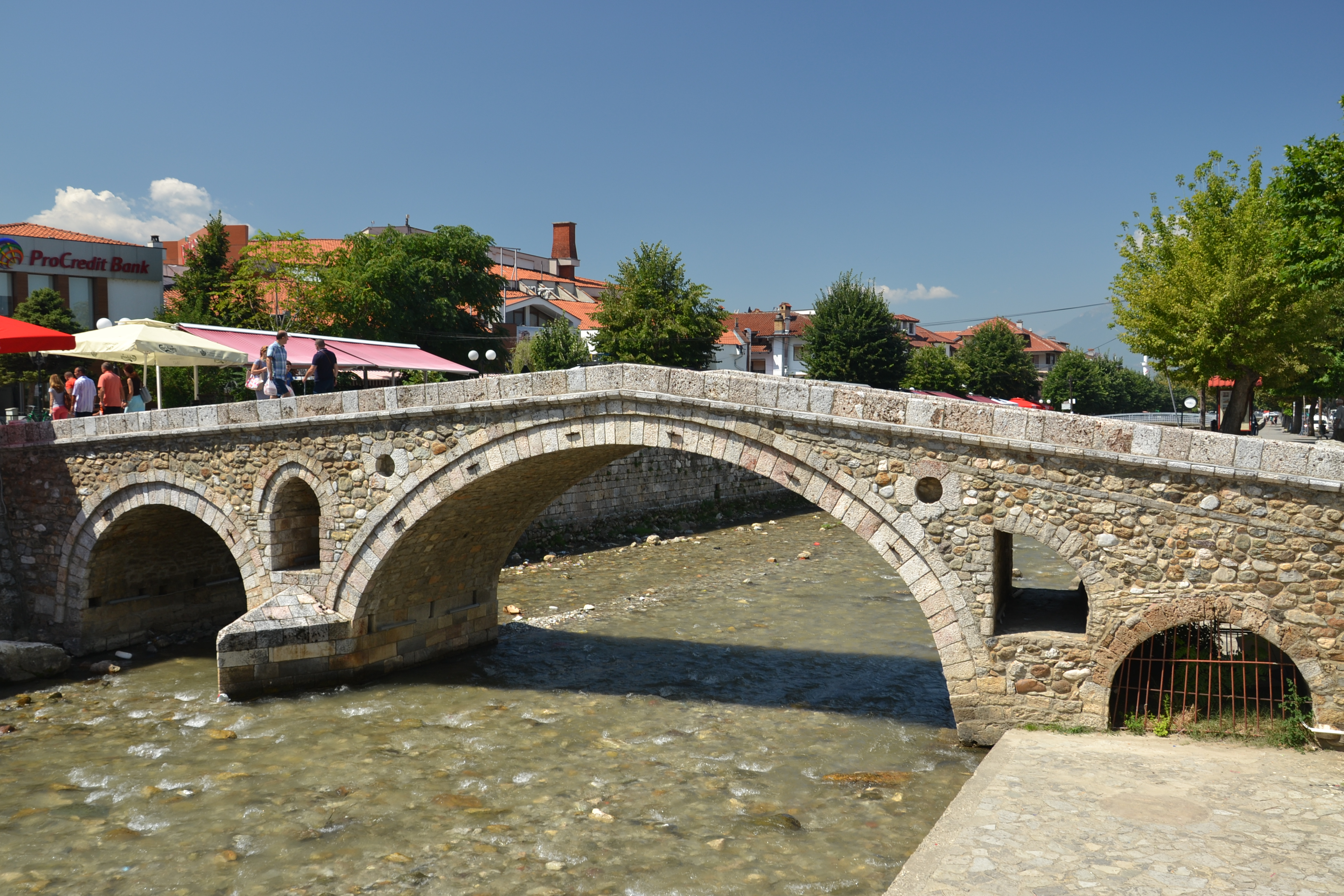
Bridge in Prizren and the Lumbardhi Prizrenit

The Old Stone Bridge in Prizren is a cultural heritage monument in Prizren, Kosovo. This monument is of the "Archaeological" category, approved with number 2345/48.

== History ==
The Stone Bridge is located in the centre of the old town. On the eastern side to it is the Arasta Bridge and on the western side is the Nalet Bridge. The bridge connects the “Shatërvan” square (on the left) and Saraçhane (on the right side of the river).

The bridge was built from Ali Bey in the 16th century in the oriental style and has spherical shape. It is built in quality carved stones, connected by lime plaster. It used to have three arches, the middle one being the highest, and the side arches were smaller. The length of the former bridge used to be approx. 30 m, while the current bridge is 17 m long. The width of the major arch is 10 m, and 5 m in height. The length of side arches is 4 m, 3 m in height. The bridge also has an additional minor arch, 103 cm long and 160 cm height. The width of the bridge route is 4,20m, paved in stone cobble. The bridge also has a 40 cm high fencing, following on its level surface, and was used only for pedestrians.

In history, the bridge has undergone major changes. It suffered serious structural damages during the construction of the Lumbardh riverbed in the 1960s. At this time, its left side arch was closed entirely. The right hand arch was damaged due to the construction of the road on the right side of the river in 1963. Nevertheless, the bridge is mostly endangered by natural factors. The flooding on 17-18 November 1979 destroyed the whole bridge. Enamoured with the bridge, the Prizren population mobilized itself, and started, on 5 June 1982 the works on its reconstruction. The restoration was led by “Elan” Company, under the supervision of the Institute for Protection of Cultural monuments in Prizren. The reconstructed bridge was solemnly inaugurated on 17 November 1982. Hence, the bridge found its natural place again, and still continues to perform its function as a pedestrian bridge.

Due to the values of heritage, the Stone Bridge was subject to state protection by Decision 2345, of 31 December 1948.
