= Prizren Bistrica =

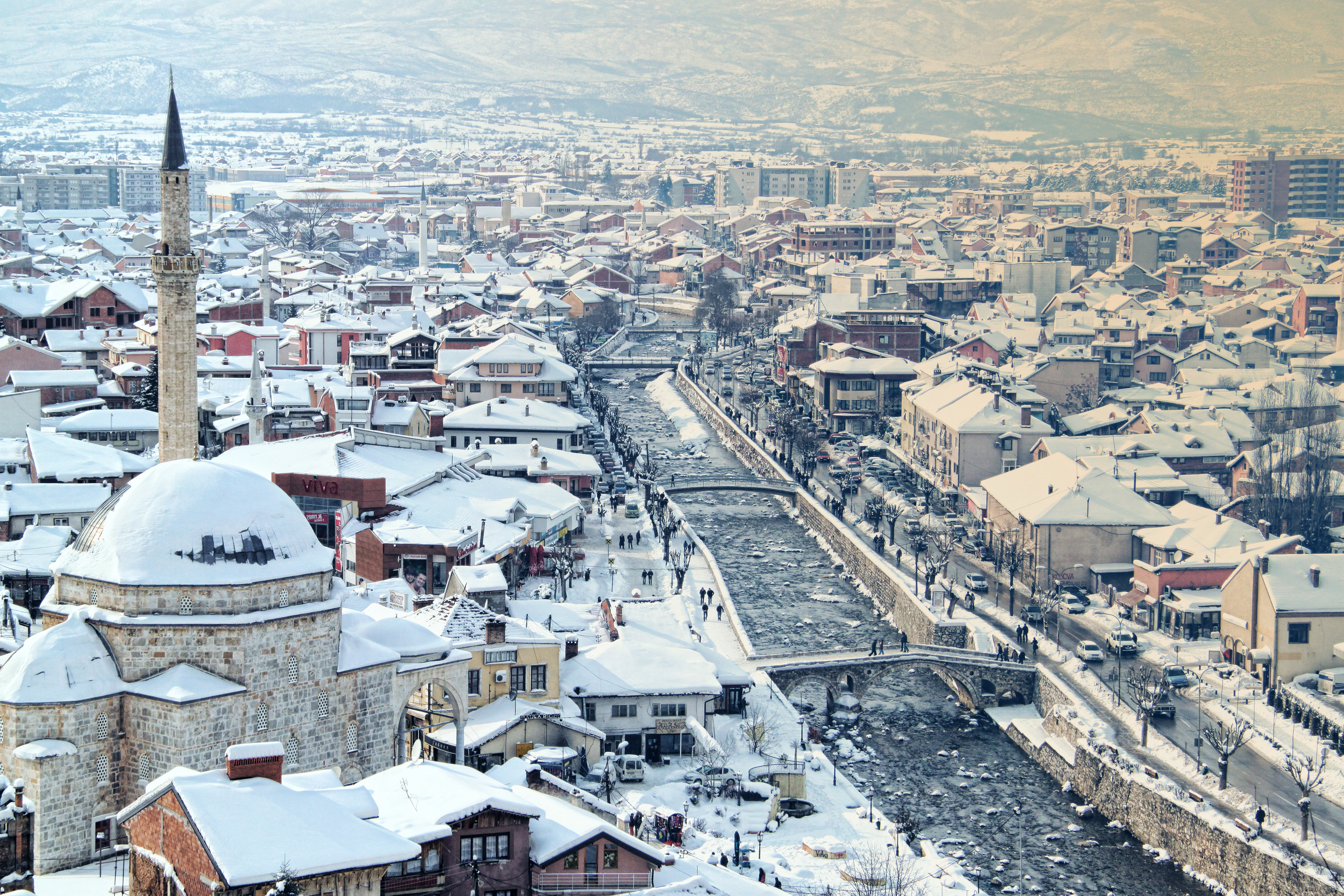
- Bistrica in Prizren during winter
- Native name: Lumbardhi i Prizrenit (Albanian); Bistrica e Prizrenit (Albanian); Призренска Бистрица (Serbian); Prizrenska Bistrica (Serbian)

Location
- Country: Kosovo

Physical characteristics
- Source
  - location: Gornje Ljubinje, Sharr Mountains, Srecka near Prizren
- Mouth
  - location: White Drin, near the village Muradem, Serbia
  - coordinates: 42.2064°N 20.6303°E
- Length: 18 km (11 mi)
- Basin size: 158 km^{2} (61 sq mi)

Basin features
- Progression: White Drin→ Drin→ Adriatic Sea

The Lumbardhi i Prizrenit or Prizren Bistrica (Albanian: Bistrica e Prizrenit; Serbian: Призренска Бистрица, romanized: Prizrenska Bistrica) is a river in Kosovo. It flows through Prizren, the second most populous city in Kosovo, and empties into the White Drin River. It is 18 km (11 mi) long, and has a drainage basin of 158 km^{2} (61 sq mi). It stems from the Sharr Mountains.

The most important tributaries of Prizren's Lumbardh are Shartica, Petroshnica, Drajçica, Lubinja, Jabllanica and Lumi i Manastirit.

The fast-flowing river water passes under Prizren's many bridges as it travels through the city.

== Name ==
The river's name, Lumbardh, literally translates to White River in Albanian. The adjective, i Prizrenit, differentiates it from the other Lumbardh tributaries of the White Drin (Albanian: Drinit të Bardhë) in the Dukagjini area.

The name Bistrica means "clearwater" in Serbian. The adjective Prizrenska, "of Prizren", is added to distinguish it from other Bistrica rivers in the Metohija region: Dečani Bistrica ("of Dečani"), Peć Bistrica ("of Peć"), Kožnjar Bistrica ("of Kožnjar"), Loćane Bistrica ("of Loćane"), etc.

== See also ==
- Prizren
- White Drin
- Prizrenasja Hydro Power Plant Museum
