= Novak, Prizren =

Novak: Novak (Albanian); новаке/Novake (Serbian)
- Village
- Location in Kosovo
- Coordinates: 42.30160693061293°N 20.755963274415816°E
- Location: Kosovo
- District: Prizren
- Municipality: Prizren

Population (2024)
  - Total: 19
- Time zone: UTC+1 (CET)
  - Summer (DST): UTC+2 (CEST)

Novak is a village in Prizren, Kosovo. Novak is situated nearby to the villages Caparc and Smać.

Novak was mentioned as a Catholic Albanian village in the 1348 Stefan Dusan chrysobull by the name of Novaci along with eight other Catholic Albanian villages within the area of Prizren.

The village was also mentioned in the Ottoman defters of the 16th century.
