= Prizren =

Second largest city of Kosovo

Prizren: Prizren or Prizreni (Albanian) Prizren or Призрен (Serbian)
- City, municipality, and historic capital
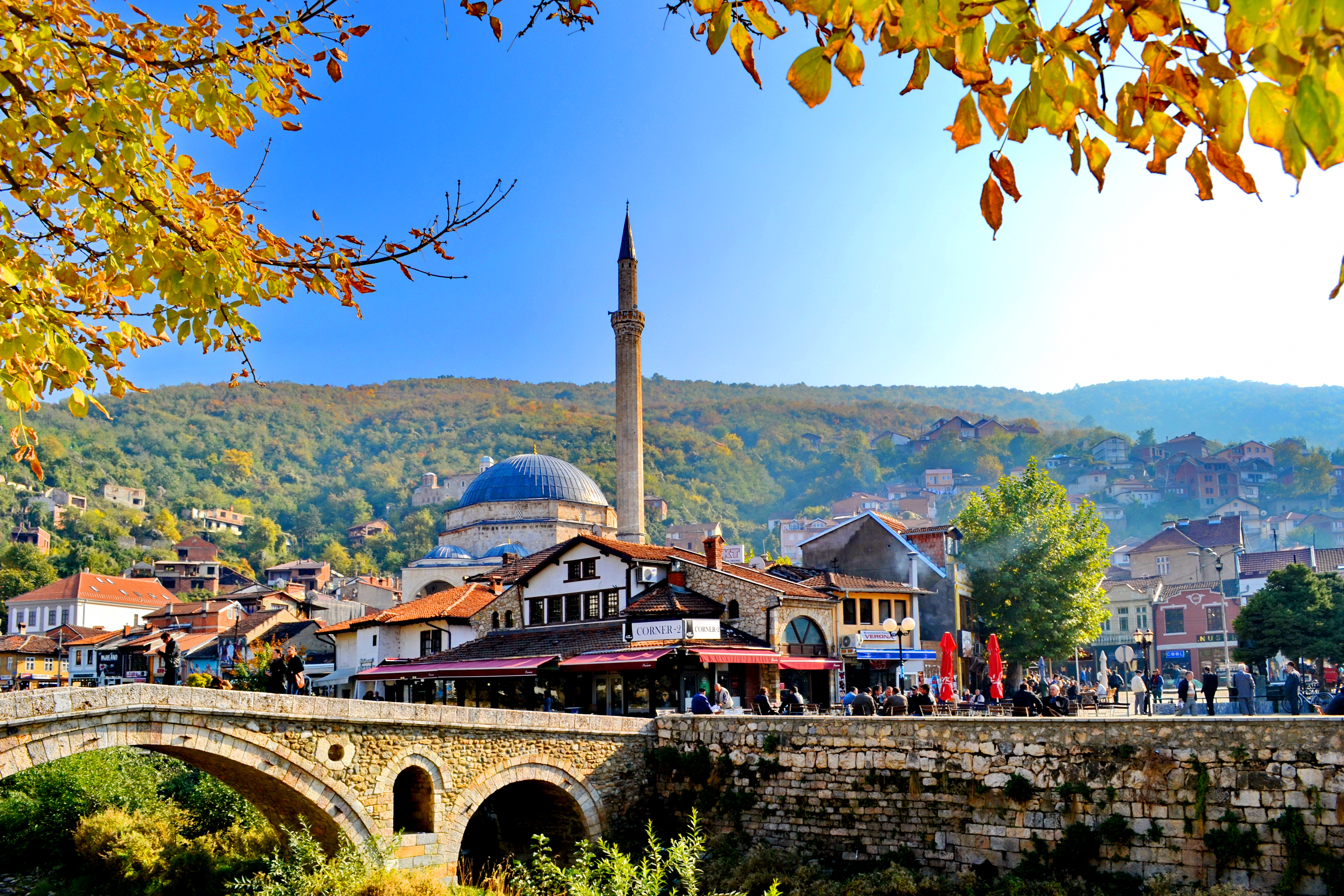
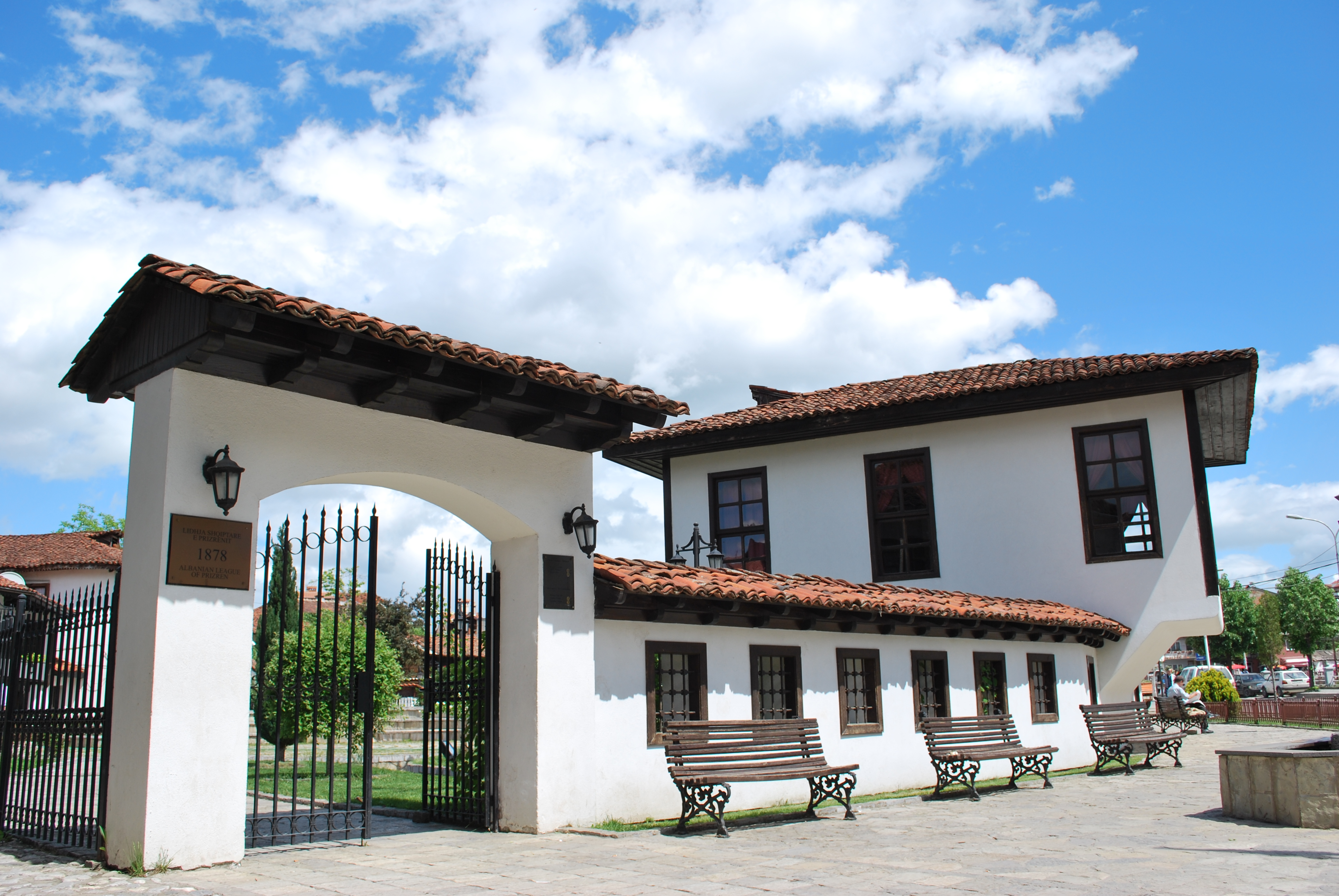
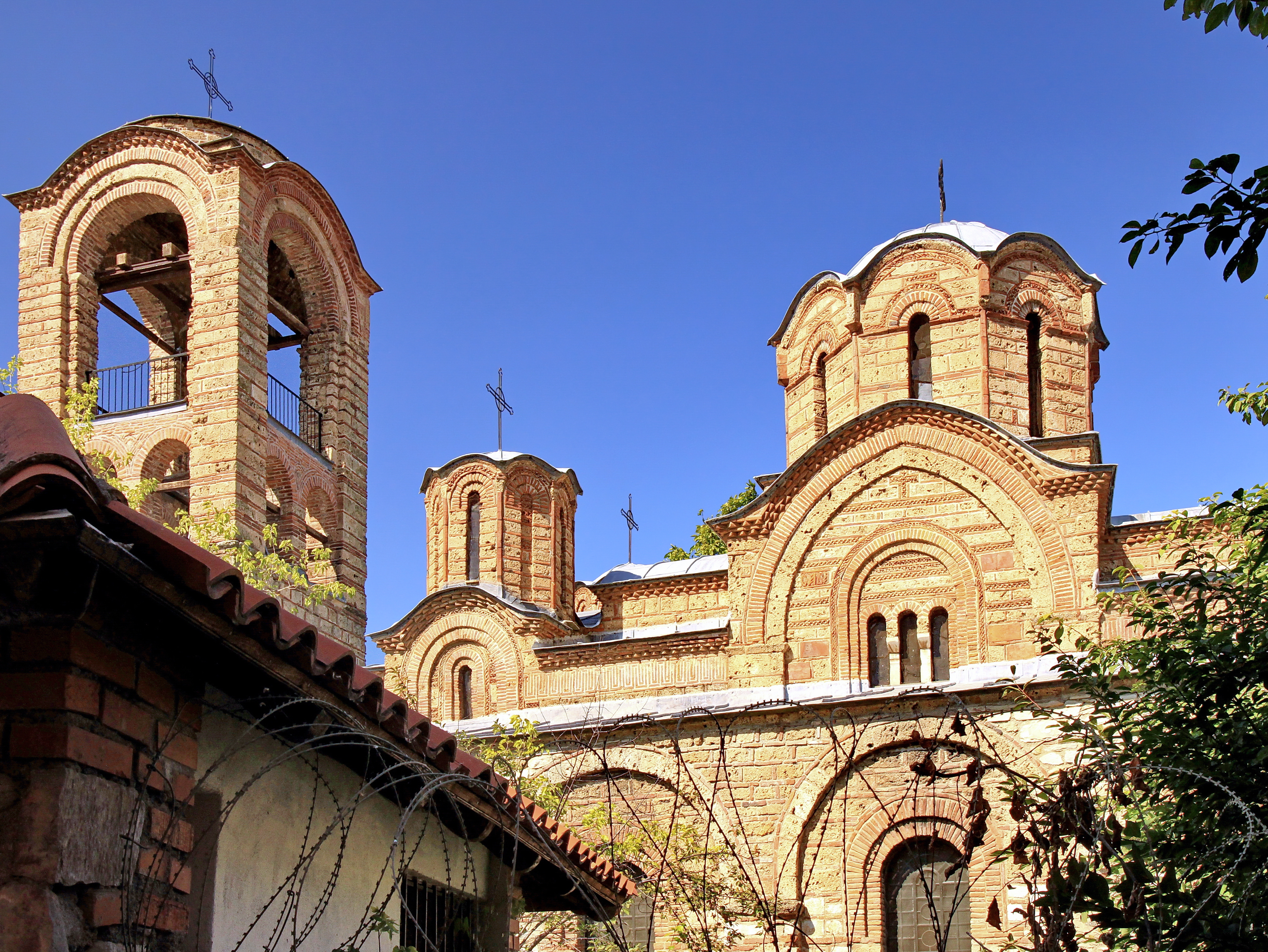
- Old Stone Bridge and Sinan Pasha Mosque Albanian League of Prizren Prizren Fortress Cathedral of Our Lady of Perpetual Succour Our Lady of Ljeviš Lumbardhi River Hydro Power Plant Museum

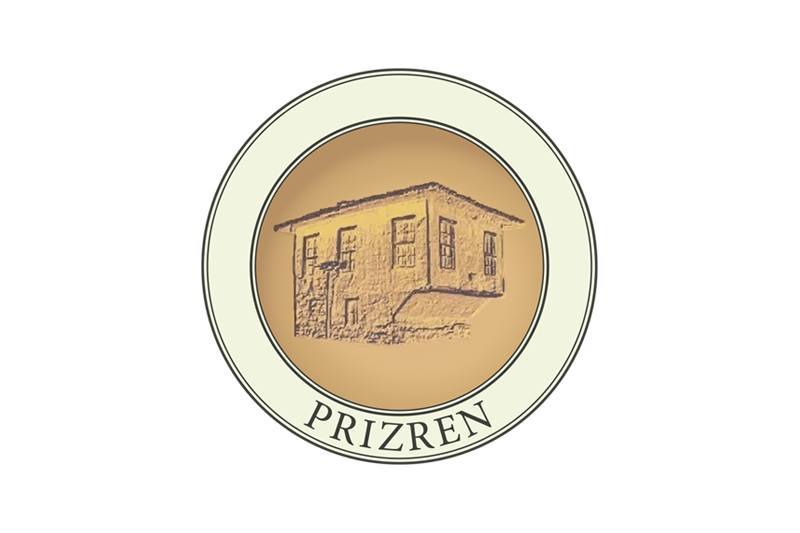
- Flag Seal
- Interactive map of Prizren
- Location within Kosovo
- Coordinates: 42°12′46″N 20°44′21″E
- Country: Kosovo
- District: Prizren

Government
  - Type: Mayor–council
  - Mayor: Shaqir Totaj (PDK)
  - Council: Prizren Municipal Council

Area
  - Municipality: 626.86 km^{2} (242.03 sq mi)
  - Rank: 2nd in Kosovo

Population (2024)
  - Municipality: 147,428
  - Rank: 2nd in Kosovo
  - Density: 235.18/km^{2} (609.13/sq mi)
  - City: 76,850
- Demonym(s): Albanian: Prizrenas (m), Prizrenase (f); Serbian: Prizrenci/Призренци
- Time zone: UTC+1 (CET)
  - Summer (DST): UTC+2 (CEST)
- Postal code: 20000
- Country code: +383 (0) 29
- Vehicle registration: 04
- Website: prizren.rks-gov.net

Prizren (Albanian definite form: Prizreni, pronounced [pɾizˈɾɛni]; Serbian Cyrillic: Призрен) is the second most populous city and municipality of Kosovo and seat of the eponymous municipality and district. It is located on the banks of the Prizren River between the foothills of the Sharr Mountains in southern Kosovo. Prizren experiences a continental climate with some Mediterranean influences.

Prizren is constitutionally designated as the historical capital of the country. Archaeological excavations in Prizren Fortress indicate that its fortress area has seen habitation and use since the Bronze Age. Prizren has been traditionally identified with the settlement of Theranda in Roman Dardania, although other locations have been suggested in recent research. In late antiquity it was part of the defensive fortification system in western Dardania and the fort was reconstructed in the era of eastern Roman Emperor Justinian. Byzantine rule in the region ended definitively in 1219-20 as the Serbian Nemanjić dynasty took control of the fort and the town. Prizren served as the capital of the Serbian Empire under the reign of Stefan Dušan, as it bloomed to become an important center of trade and commerce during Dušan's reign. From 1371, a series of regional feudal rulers controlled Prizren, including the Mrnjavčević family, the Balšić noble family, the Branković dynasty. Ottoman Turks captured Prizren from Serbian Despotate in 1455 and almost immediately served as the capital of Sanjak of Prizren in the Ottoman Empire. While standing as an important administrative city for the Ottomans, Prizren became an important political center of the Albanian Renaissance during the late 19th century.

Prizren was the seat of the League of Prizren, serving as the center of Albanian nationalism and resistance.

== Name ==
The name of the city has been linked with that of Petrizen, a Dardani fort mentioned by Procopius in the 6th century.

Hamp has suggested that the name of the city roughly meant "ford-horned animal" with the IE root *ḱrn "horn, horned-thing" (cf. Oxford). According to Curtis, the toponym Prizren follows Albanian phonetic sound rules, meaning that the name developed under an Albanian-speaking population.

== History ==
=== Early period ===
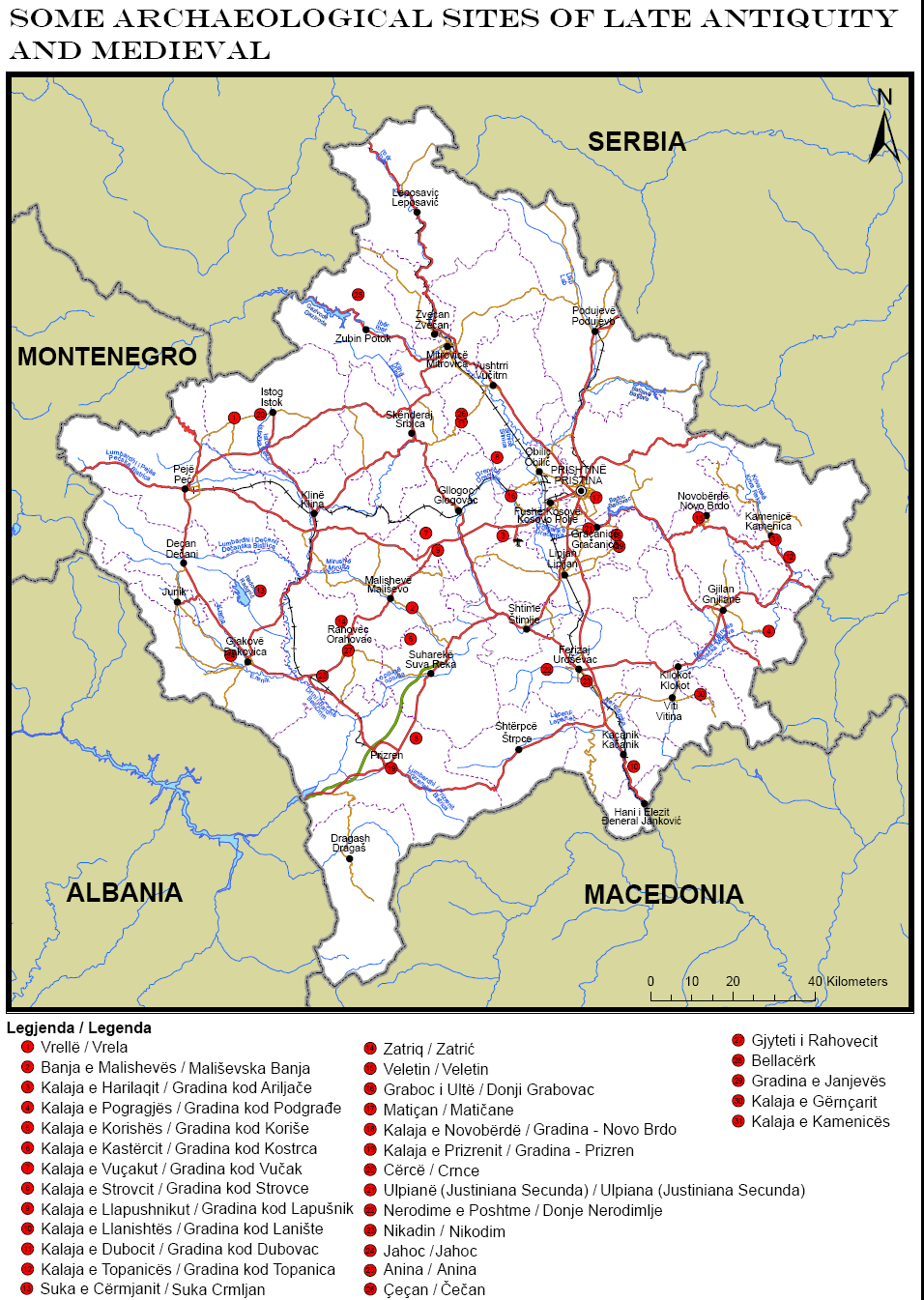
Forts and settlements in late antiquity and medieval Kosovo.

Prizren has been traditionally identified with Theranda, a town dating from the Roman Empire. However, recent research suggests that Theranda may have been located at present-day Suva Reka. Archaeological research has shown that the site of the Prizren Fortress has had several eras of habitation since prehistoric times. In its lower part, material from the upper part of the fort has been deposited over the centuries. It dates from the Middle Bronze Age (c. 2000 BCE) to the late Iron Age (c. 1st century CE) and is comparable to the material found in the nearby prehistoric site in the village of Vlashnjë (~10 km west of Prizren). In 2005, prehistoric rock paintings in a ritual site related to the cycle of life were found near Vlashnjë. They represent the first find of prehistoric rock art in the region.

In late antiquity, the fortification saw a phase of reconstruction. It is part of a series of forts that were built or reconstructed in the same period by Justinian along the White Drin in northern Albania and western Kosovo in the routes that linked the coastal areas with the Kosovo valley. At this time, the Prizren fortress likely appears in historical record as Petrizen in the 6th century CE in the work of Procopius as one of the fortifications which Justinian commissioned to be reconstructed in Dardania.

Konstantin Jireček believed, from the correspondence of bishop Demetrios Chomatenos of Ohrid (1216–36), that Prizren was one of the areas occupied by the Albanians prior to the Slavic expansion.

=== Middle Ages ===
Present-day Prizren is first mentioned in 1019 at the time of Basil II (r. 976–1025) in the form of Prisdriana. In 1072, the leaders of the Bulgarian Uprising of Georgi Voiteh traveled from their center in Skopje to the area of Prizren and held a meeting in which they invited Mihailo Vojislavljević of Duklja to send them assistance. Mihailo sent his son, Constantine Bodin, and 300 of his soldiers. Dalassenos Doukas, dux of Bulgaria was sent against the combined forces, but was defeated near Prizren, which was then extensively plundered by the Serbian army. The Bulgarian magnates proclaimed Bodin "Emperor of the Bulgarians" after this initial victory. They were defeated by Nikephoros Bryennios in the area of northern Macedonia by the end of 1072. The area was raided by Serbian ruler Vukan in the 1090s. Demetrios Chomatenos is the last Byzantine archbishop of Ohrid to include Prizren in his jurisdiction until 1219. Stefan Nemanja had seized the surrounding area along the White Drin between the 1180s and 1190s, but this may refer to the areas Prizren diocese rather than the fort and the settlement itself and he may have lost control of them later. The ecclesiastical split of Prizren from the Patriarchate of Constantinople in 1219 was the final act of establishing Serbian Nemanjić rule in the town. Prizren and its fort were the administrative and economic center of the župa of Podrimlje (in Albanian, Podrima or Anadrini). The old town of Prizren developed below the fortress along the left bank of the Bistrica/Lumbardhi. Ragusan traders were stationed in the old town. Prizren over time became a trading hub and gateway for Ragusan trade towards eastern Kosovo and beyond. In this period, Stefan Dušan founded and was buried in the Monastery of the Holy Archangels in Prizren. Prizren briefly served as the capital of the Serbian Empire and was a crossroad of important trade goods between Dubrovnik and Constantinople.

In 1330, Serbian king Stefan Dečanski explicitly mentioned the presence of Albanians and the Albanian names of villages in Kosovo, in particular in the districts of Prizren and that of Skopje. A chrysobull of the Serbian Tsar Stefan Dušan that was given to the Monastery of Saint Mihail and Gavril in Prizren between the years of 1348-1353 states the presence of Albanians in the vicinity of Prizren, the Dukagjin Plain and in the villages of Drenica. Within this chrysobull, nine Albanian stock-breeding villages within the vicinity of Prizren are mentioned explicitly - these villages are known with the names Gjinovci (Gjinajt), Magjerci, Bjellogllavci (Kryebardhët), Flokovci (Flokajt), Crnça, Caparci (Çaparajt), Gjonovci (Gjonajt), Shpinadinci (Shpinajt) and Novaci. Entire Albanian villages were gifted by Serbian kings, particularly Stefan Dušan, as presents to Serb monasteries within Prizren, Deçan and Tetova. Additionally, people with Albanian anthroponymy are repeatedly mentioned in a 1348 chrysobull of Stefan Dušan that lists those who pray at the monastery of St. Michael and Gabriel in Prizren as well as some of the inhabitants of the city itself and the surrounding villages. In one of Stefan Dušan's documents in 1355, a soldier with Albanian anthroponymy is exclusively mentioned as one of the people who must continuously pay the Monastery of St. Nicholas in the village of Billushë near Prizren.

People with Albanian anthroponymy are also mentioned in a 1452 register within the vicinity of Prizren in villages such as Mazrek, Kojushe, Milaj, Zhur, Xerxe, Pllaneje, Gorozhup, Zym. In the area of Prizren, Albanian toponyms were recorded in the 14th and 15th century such as Rudina e Leshit, Truallishta e Gjon Bardhit, Llazi i Tanushit, Truallishta e Komanit, Shpija e Bushatit, Zhur, and Mazrek. In 1330, Albanian toponyms such as Katun Arbanas (The Albanian village) were mentioned in the area between Prizren-Rahovec.

With the death of Stefan Uroš V in 1371, a series of competing regional nobles sieged, counter-sieged and held control of Prizren – increasingly with Ottoman support and intervention. The first who tried to gain control of Prizren and the trade that passed through the town was Prince Marko, but after his defeat in the Battle of Maritsa in September 1371, the Balšići of the Principality of Zeta moved to take Prizren in the fall and winter of 1371. In the spring of 1372, Nikola Altomanović besieged Prizren and tried to expand his rule, but was defeated. The death of Đurađ I Balšić in 1377 created another power vacuum – Đurađ Branković then took over Prizren. The Battle of Kosovo led to an additional political change, as Gjon Kastrioti granted special privileges regarding commerce to Ragusa and its inhabitants travelling to Prizren.

The Catholic Church retained influence in the area; 14th-century documents refer to two Catholic churches in Prizren.

=== Ottoman Period ===
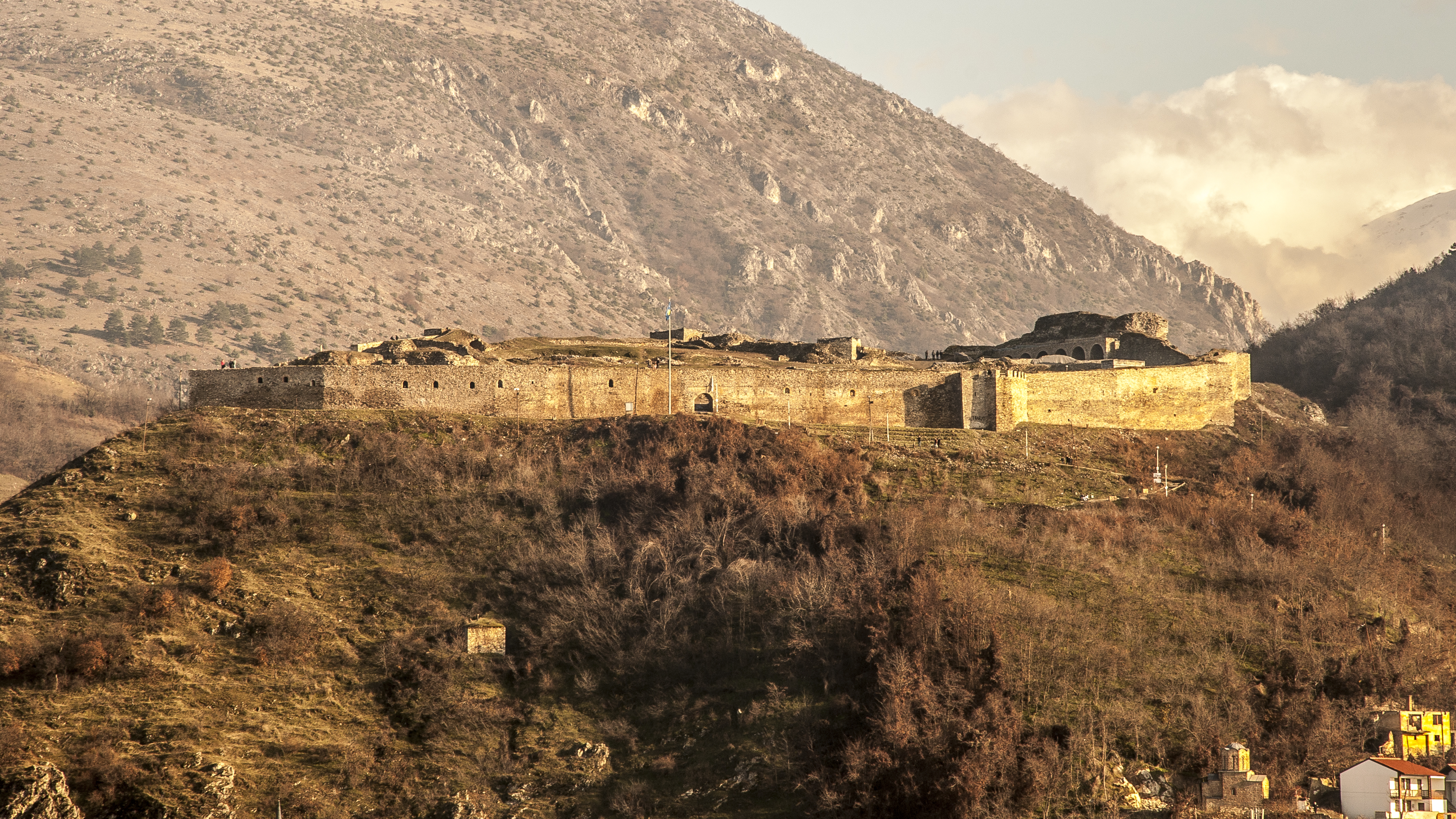
The Fortress of Prizren.

After several years of attack and counterattack, the Ottomans made a major invasion of Kosovo in 1454; Attempts of liberating the Prizren area earlier by Skanderbeg and thereafter by John Hunyadi failed, as Đurađ Branković was an Ottoman vassal at this time and did not grant passage into Kosovo for the Crusaders to fight the Ottomans. On 21 June 1455, Prizren surrendered to the Ottoman army. Prizren was the capital of the Sanjak of Prizren, and under new administrative organization of Ottoman Empire it became capital of the Vilayet. Later, it became part of the larger Rumelia Eyalet. It was a prosperous trade city, benefiting from its position on the north-south and east-west trade routes across the Empire. Prizren became one of the larger cities of the Kosovo vilayet (vilayet).

In the Nahyia of Hoca in the 16th century around 409 heads of families and 104 landowners bore Albanian names. Roughly around 45 villages had majority Albanian names while the lands between Prizren and Gjakova itself had villages with majority Albanian names and there exist also many cases of mixed Albanian-Slavic anthroponymy.

In the Ottoman Defter of 1591, the city of Prizren itself was recorded under the Sanjak of Prizren - this includes the household heads of the city. By this time, Prizren had been significantly Islamised, as reflected by the anthroponymy of the inhabitants; several cases of Muslim inhabitants with mixtures of Muslim and Albanian anthroponymy exist (i.e. Ali Gjoci, Hasan Gjinaj, Ferhad Reçi, Hasan Bardi...). The Muslim neighbourhoods (Mahalla/Mëhalla) consisted of Xhamia e Vjetër (Old Mosque, 53 homes), Levisha (50 homes), Ajas beu (15 homes), Haxhi Kasem (48 homes), Jazixhi Sinani (71 homes), Çarshia (also called Jakub beu, 18 homes), Kurila (31 homes) and Mëhalla e lëkurëpunuesve (neighbourhood of the leatherworkers, 34 homes). The Christian neighbourhoods (Mahalla/Mëhalla) consisted of Pazari i Vjetër (Old Market, 8 homes), Madhiq (37 homes), Vasil (27 homes), Kodha (13 homes), Çarshia/Pjetri Nikolla (14 homes), Bogoi Riber (11 homes), Radmir (51 homes), Jazixhi Sinani (mentioned beforehand, 24 homes), Pandelja (29 homes), Prend Vriça (9 homes) and Ajas (13 homes). The neighbourhoods of Pandelja, Jazixhi Sinani and Kodha were dominated by inhabitants with characteristically Albanian anthroponymy; the other neighbourhoods saw a blend between predominantly Slavic/Slavic-Albanian (or rather, Orthodox) anthroponymy.

Lazaro Soranzo, writing in the 16th century, noted the town was inhabited "more by Albanians than by Serbs". In 1624 Pjeter Mazrreku reported the town was inhabited by 12,000 Muslims, almost all of them Albanians (‘Turchi, quasi tutti Albanesi’), 200 Catholics and 600 'Serviani'. Gjergj Bardhi, during his visit in Prizren, wrote in 1638 that the area was inhabited by Albanians and that the Albanian language was spoken there. In the 1630's, the Ottoman Turkish traveller Hajji Khalifa wrote that the town of Prizren was inhabited by Albanians. In 1651, the Albanian Catholic priest of Prizren Gregor Mazrreku reported that many men within Prizren converted to Islam to avoid the Jizya tax, and that they would ask Gregor to give them confession and Holy Communion in secrecy, which he had refused to do.

During the Austrian-Ottoman wars, the local Albanian population in the Prizren region rallied to support the Austrians against the Ottomans under the leadership of the Albanian priest Pjeter Bogdani. Documents and dispatches refer to the Austrians marching to "Prizren, the capital of Albania" where they were welcomed by Bogdani and 5,000-6,000 Albanian soldiers. The Albanian Catholic priest Toma Raspasani wrote that, once the Austrians had been expelled and Prizren was firmly in the hands of the Ottomans yet again, nobody was able to leave Prizren. In 1693, Toma also wrote that many of the Catholics in Kosovo had gone to Hungary where most of them died of hunger or disease.

=== Albanian Renaissance ===
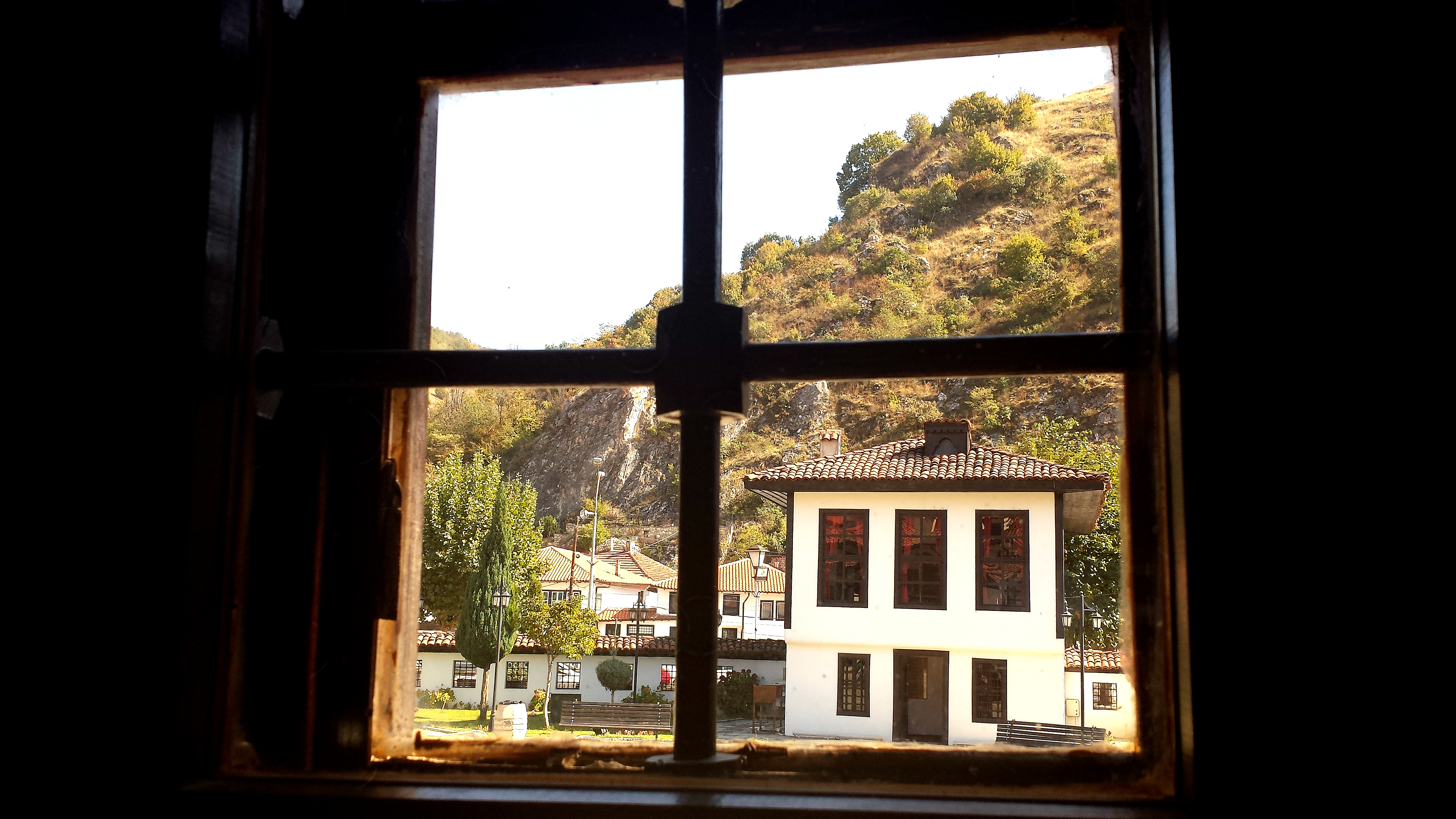
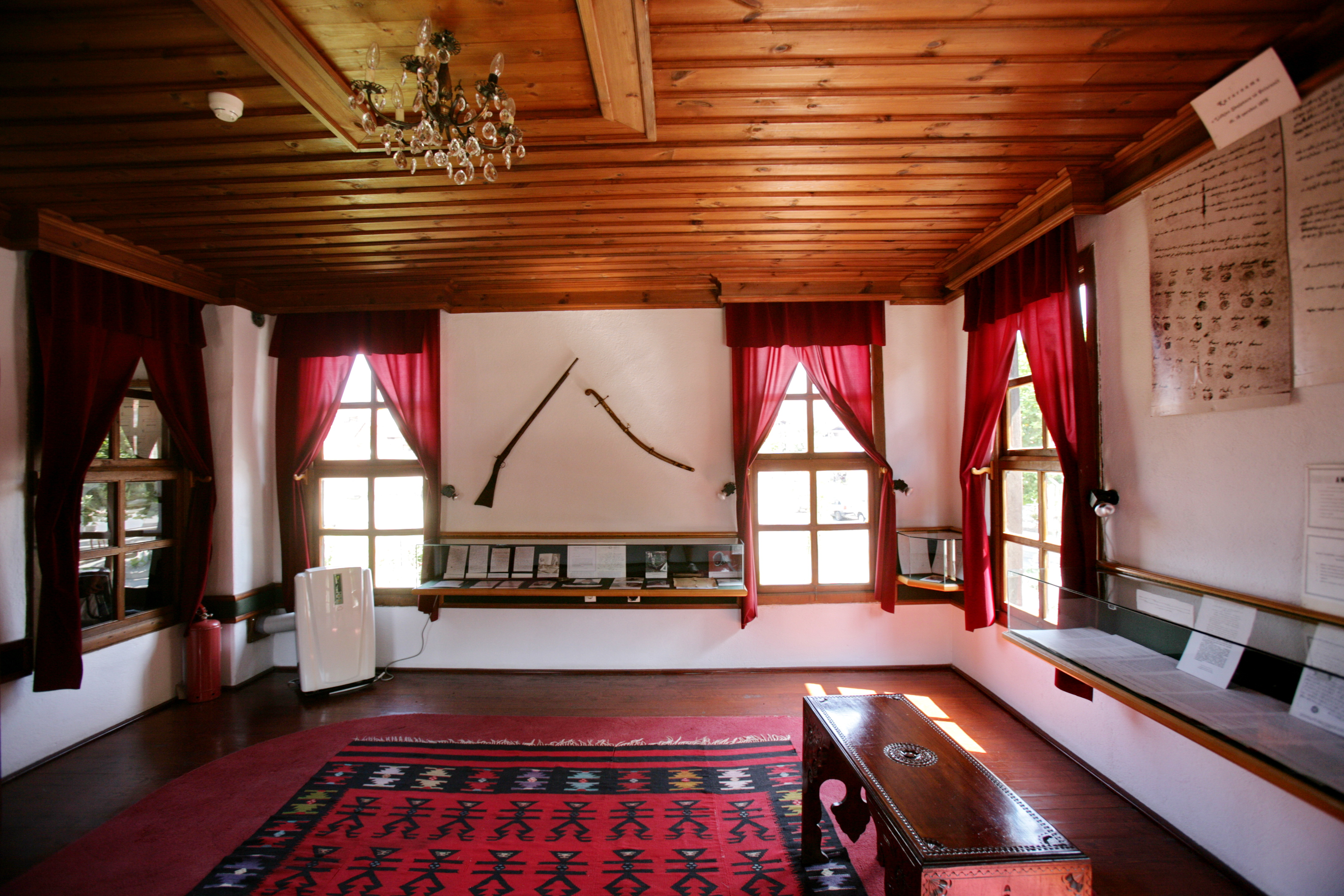
The League of Prizren was founded on 5 January 1877 in the old town of Prizren.

Prizren was the cultural and intellectual centre of Ottoman Kosovo. It was dominated by its Muslim population, who composed over 70% of its population in 1857. The city became a major Albanian cultural centre and the coordination political and cultural capital of the Kosovar Albanians. In 1871, a long Serbian seminary was opened in Prizren, discussing the possible joining of the old Serbia's territories with the Principality of Serbia. It was an important part of Kosovo Vilayet between 1877 and 1912.

During the late 19th century, the city became a focal point for Albanian nationalism and in 1878, it was the site of the creation of the League of Prizren, a movement formed to seek the national unification and autonomy of Albanians within the Ottoman Empire. The Young Turk Revolution was a step in the dissolving of the Ottoman empire that led to the Balkan Wars. The Third Army (Ottoman Empire) had a division in Prizren, the 30th Reserve Infantry Division (Otuzuncu Pirzerin Redif Fırkası).

=== Modern ===
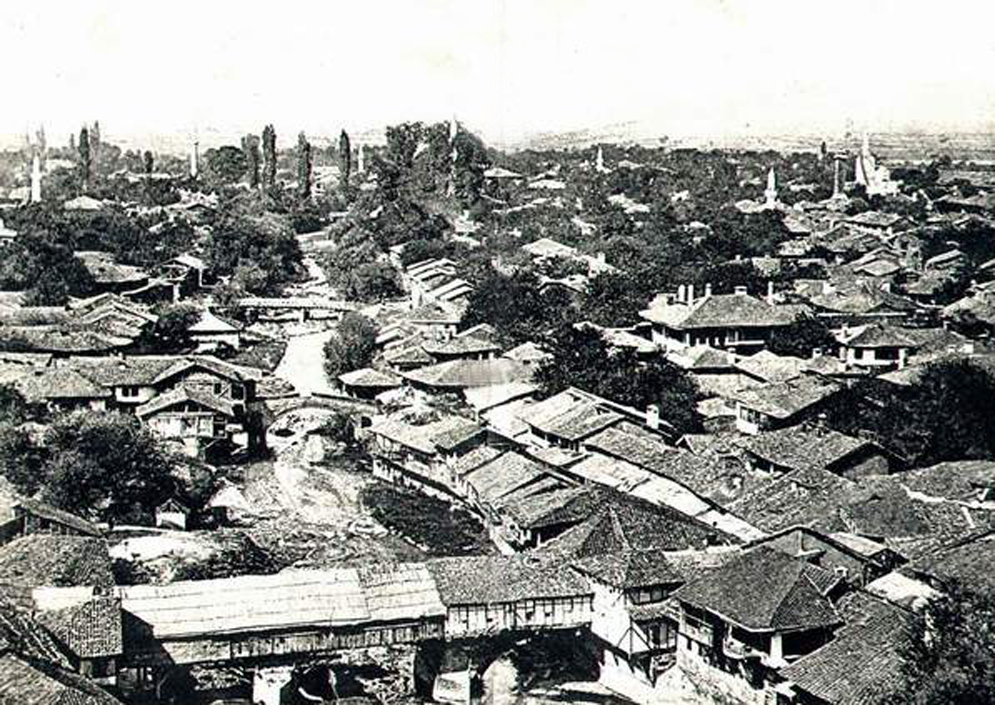
View of the city September 1863 taken by Viennese photographer Josef Székely

The Prizren attachment was part of the İpek Detachment in the First Balkan War. During the First Balkan War, the city was captured by the Serbian army and incorporated into the Kingdom of Serbia. Although the troops met little resistance, the takeover was bloody, with 400 people dead in the first few days; the local population would call the city "The Kingdom of Death." The Daily Chronicle reported on 12 November 1912 that 5,000 Albanians were slaughtered in Prizren. Serbian general Božidar Janković forced the local Albanian leaders to sign a declaration of gratitude to King Peter I of Serbia for their "liberation by the Serbian army". Following the capture of Prizren, most foreigners were barred from entering the city as the Montenegrin forces temporarily closed the city before full control was restored. A few visitors did make it through, including Leon Trotsky, then working as a journalist for the Ukrainian newspaper Kijewskaja mysl, and reports eventually emerged of widespread killings of Albanians. In a 1912 news report on the Serbian Army and the Paramilitary Chetniks in Prizren, Trotsky stated "Among them were intellectuals, men of ideas, nationalist zealots, but these were isolated individuals. The rest were just thugs, robbers who had joined the army for the sake of loot... The Serbs in Old Serbia, in their national endeavour to correct data in the ethnographical statistics that are not quite favourable to them, are engaged quite simply in systematic extermination of the Muslim population". British traveller Edith Durham and a British military attaché were supposed to visit Prizren in October 1912, however the trip was prevented by the authorities. Durham stated: "I asked wounded Montenegrins [Soldiers] why I was not allowed to go and they laughed and said, 'We have not left a nose on an Albanian up there!' Not a pretty sight for a British officer." Eventually Durham visited a northern Albanian outpost in Kosovo where she met captured Ottoman soldiers whose upper lips and noses had been cut off.

After the First Balkan War of 1912, the Conference of Ambassadors in London allowed the creation of the state of Albania and handed Kosovo to the Kingdom of Serbia, even though the population of Kosovo remained mostly Albanian.

In 1913, an official Austro-Hungarian report recorded that 30,000 people had fled to Prizren from Bosnia. In January 1914 the Austro-Hungarian consul based in Prizren conducted a detailed report on living conditions in the city. The report stated that Kingdom of Serbia didn't keep its promise for equal treatment of Albanians and Muslims. Thirty of the thirty-two mosques in Prizren had been turned into hay barns, ammunition stores and military barracks. The people of the city were heavily taxed, with Muslims and Catholic Christians having to pay more tax than Orthodox Christians. The local government was predominately made up of former Serb Chetniks. The report also noted that the Serbs were also dissatisfied with the living conditions in Prizren.

=== World War I and World War II ===
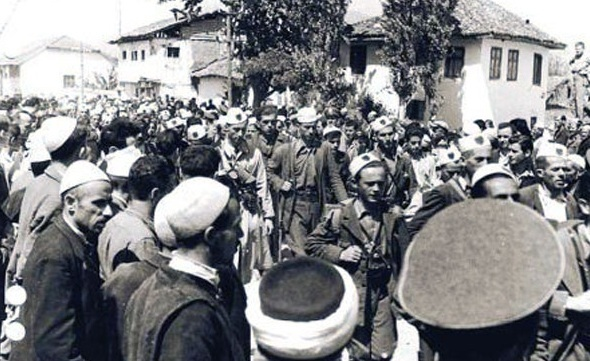
Ballist forces in Prizren, 1944

With the outbreak of the First World War, the Kingdom of Serbia was invaded by Austro-Hungarian forces and later by Bulgarian forces. By 29 November 1915, Prizren fell to Bulgarian and Austro-Hungarian forces. In April 1916, Austria-Hungary allowed the Kingdom of Bulgaria to occupy the city with the understanding that a significant amount of the city's population were ethnic Bulgarians. During this period, there was a process of forced Bulgarisation with many Serbs being interned; Serbs suffered worse in Bulgarian occupied regions of Kosovo compared to Austrian occupied regions due to the Bulgarian defeat in the Second Balkan War and due to the long-standing rivalry between the Bulgarian Orthodox Church and the Serbian Orthodox Church. According to Catholic Archbishop of Skopje, Lazër Mjeda who was taking refuge in Prizren at the time, roughly 1,000 people had died of hunger in 1917. In October 1918 following the fall of Macedonia to Allied Forces, the Serbian Army along with the French 11th colonial division and the Italian 35th Division pushed the Austro-Hungarian and Bulgarian forces out of the city. By the end of 1918, the Kingdom of Serbs, Croats and Slovenes was formed. The Kingdom was renamed in 1929 to the Kingdom of Yugoslavia and Prizren became a part of its Vardar Banovina.

In World War II Nazi Germany and Fascist Italy invaded the Kingdom of Yugoslavia on 6 April 1941 and by 9 April the Germans who had invaded Yugoslavia from the East with neighbouring Bulgaria as base were on the outskirts of Prizren and by 14 April Prizren had fallen to the Italians who had invaded Yugoslavia from the West in neighbouring Albania; there was however notable resistance in Prizren before Yugoslavia unconditionally surrendered on 19 April 1941. Prizren along with most of Kosovo was annexed to the Italian puppet state of Albania. Soon after the Italian occupation, the Albanian Fascist Party established a blackshirt battalion in Prizren, but plans to establish two more battalions were dropped due to the lack of public support.

In 1943 Bedri Pejani of the German Wehrmacht helped create the Second League of Prizren.

=== Socialist Yugoslavia ===
In 1944, German forces were driven out of Kosovo by a combined Russian-Bulgarian force, and then the Communist government of Yugoslavia took control. In 1946, the town was formulated as a part of Kosovo and Metohija which the Constitution defined the Autonomous Region of Kosovo and Metohija within the People's Republic of Serbia, a constituent state of the Federal People's Republic of Yugoslavia.

The Province was renamed to Socialist Autonomous Province of Kosovo in 1974, remaining part of the Socialist Republic of Serbia, but having attributions similar to a Socialist Republic within the Socialist Federal Republic of Yugoslavia. The former status was restored in 1989, and officially in 1990.

For many years after the restoration of Serbian rule, Prizren and the region of Dečani to the west remained centres of Albanian nationalism. In 1956 the Yugoslav secret police put on trial in Prizren nine Kosovo Albanians accused of having been infiltrated into the country by the (hostile) Communist Albanian regime of Enver Hoxha. The "Prizren trial" became something of a cause célèbre after it emerged that a number of leading Yugoslav Communists had allegedly had contacts with the accused. The nine accused were all convicted and sentenced to long prison sentences but were released and declared innocent in 1968 with Kosovo's assembly declaring that the trial had been "staged and mendacious."

=== Kosovo War ===
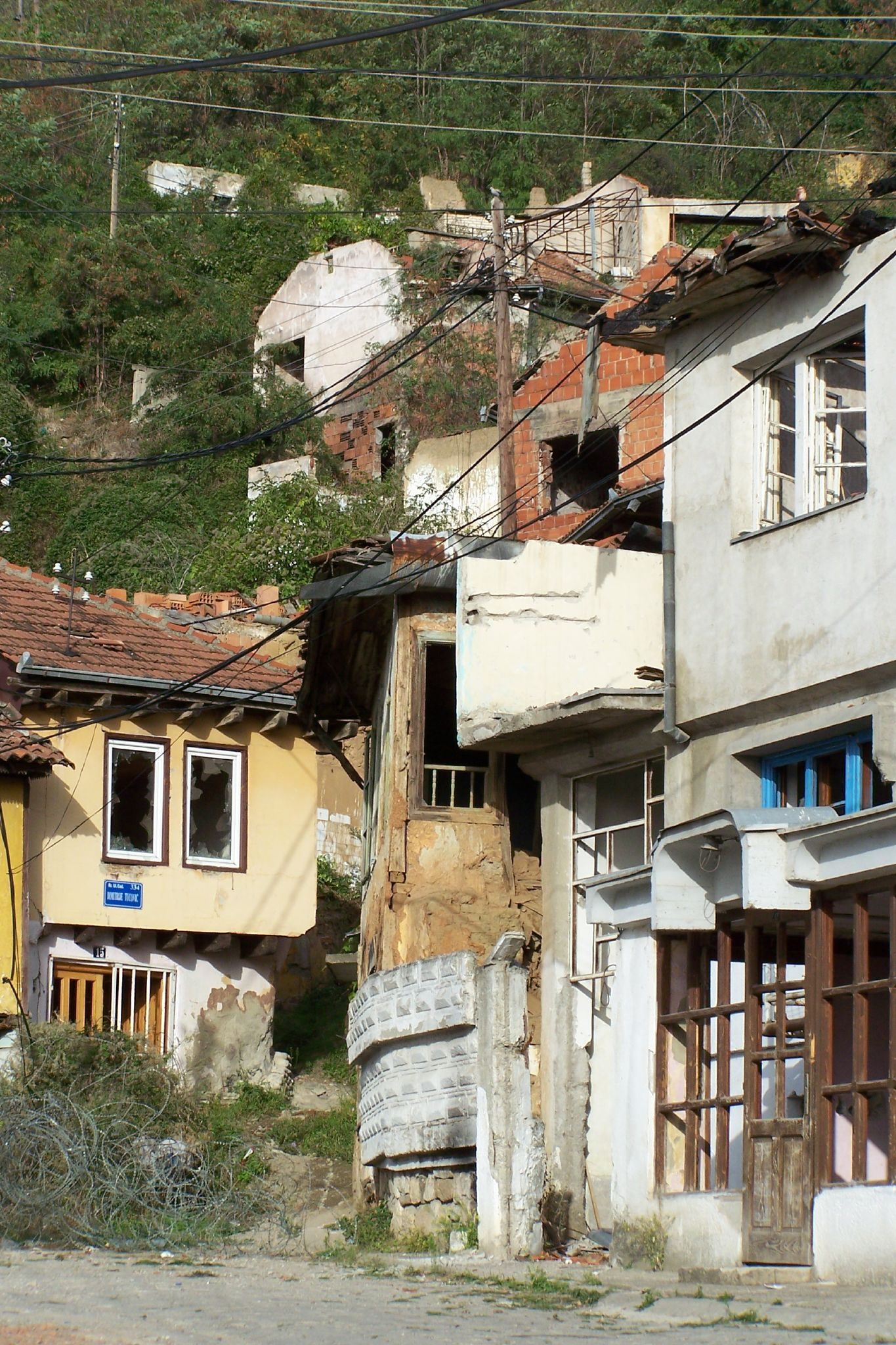
Destroyed quarter of Prizren

The town of Prizren did not suffer much during the Kosovo War, but its surrounding municipality was badly affected during 1998–1999. Before the war, the Organization for Security and Co-operation in Europe estimated that the municipality's population was about 78% Kosovo Albanian, 5% Serb and 17% from other national communities. During the war most of the Albanian population were either forced or intimidated into leaving the town. Tusus Neighborhood suffered the most. Some twenty-seven to thirty-four people were killed and over one hundred houses were burned.

At the end of the war in June 1999, most of the Albanian population returned to Prizren. Serbian and Roma minorities fled, with the OSCE estimating that 97% of Serbs and 60% of Romani had left Prizren by October. The community is now predominantly ethnically Albanian, but other minorities such as Turkish, Ashkali (a minority declaring itself as Albanian Roma) and Bosniak (including Torbesh community) live there as well, be that in the city itself, or in villages around. Such locations include Sredska, Mamushë, and the region of Gora.

Much of Potkaljaja, the old Serb neighbourhood along the hillside in the centre of town, was looted and burned to the ground following the Yugoslav Army withdrawal. Since 2010 most of the neighbourhood has been rebuilt.

The war and its aftermath caused only a moderate amount of damage to the city compared to other cities in Kosovo. Serbian forces destroyed an important Albanian cultural monument in Prizren, the League of Prizren building, but the complex was rebuilt later on and now constitutes the Monumental Complex of the Albanian League of Prizren.

On 17 March 2004, during the Unrest in Kosovo some Serb cultural monuments in Prizren were damaged, burned or destroyed, including Orthodox Serb churches, such as Our Lady of Ljeviš from 1307 (UNESCO World Heritage Site), the Church of Holy Salvation, Church of St. George (the city's largest church), Church of St. George (Runjevac), Church of St. Kyriaki, Church of St. Nicolas (Tutić Church), the Monastery of The Holy Archangels, as well as Prizren's Orthodox seminary of Saint Cyrillus and Methodius.

Also, during that riot, the entire Serb quarter of Prizren, near the Prizren Fortress, was completely destroyed, as a revenge for the crimes committed during the war from the Serbian army and all remaining Serb population was evicted from Prizren. Simultaneously Islamic cultural heritage and mosques were destroyed and damaged.

=== 21st century ===
The municipality of Prizren is still the most culturally and ethnically heterogeneous city of Kosovo, retaining communities of Bosniaks, Turks, and Romani in addition to the majority Kosovo Albanian population. Only a small number of Kosovo Serbs remain in Prizren and its surrounds, residing mainly in small villages. Prizren's Turkish community is socially prominent and influential, and the Turkish language is widely spoken even by non-ethnic Turks.

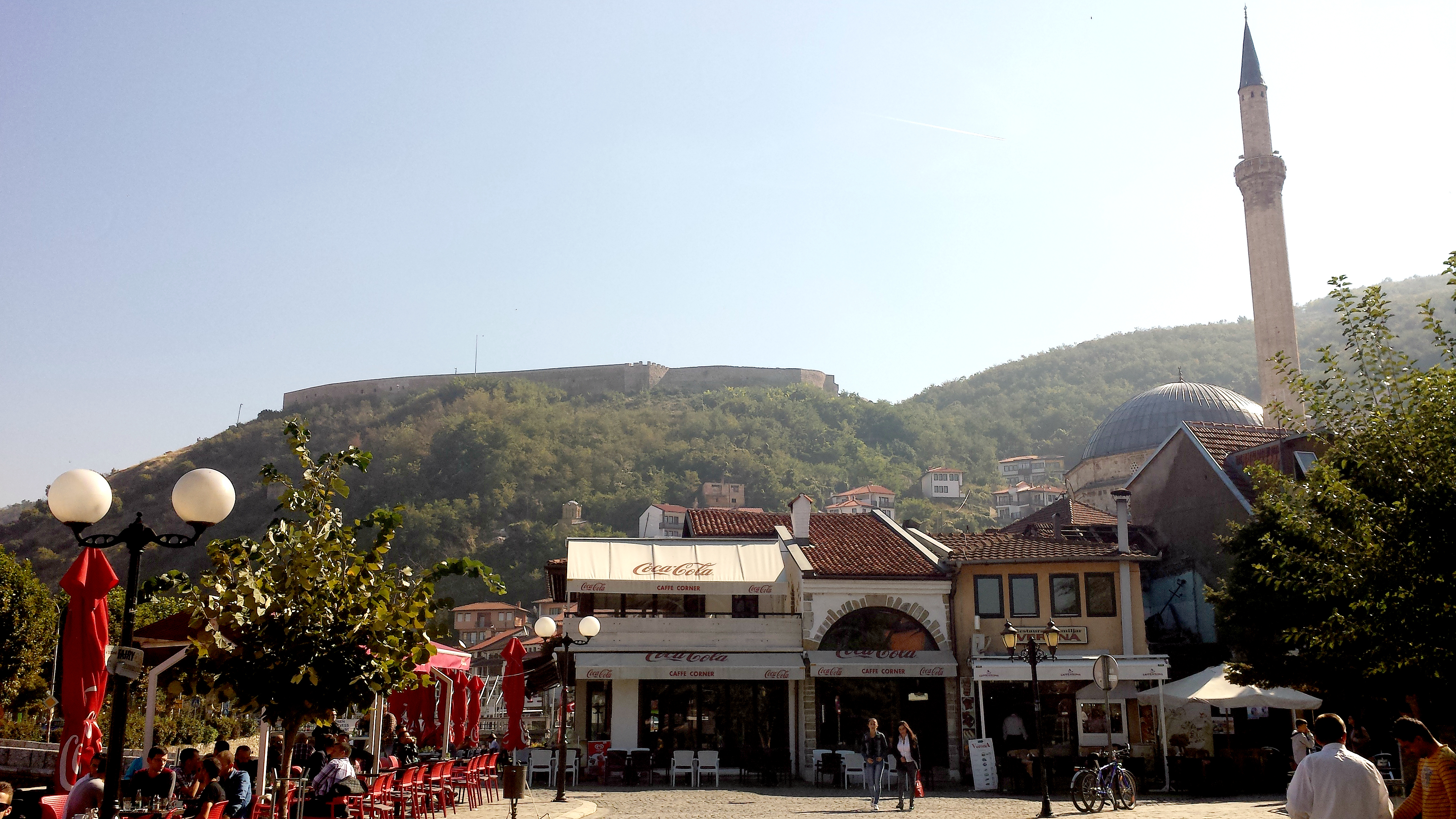
Panorama of centre.
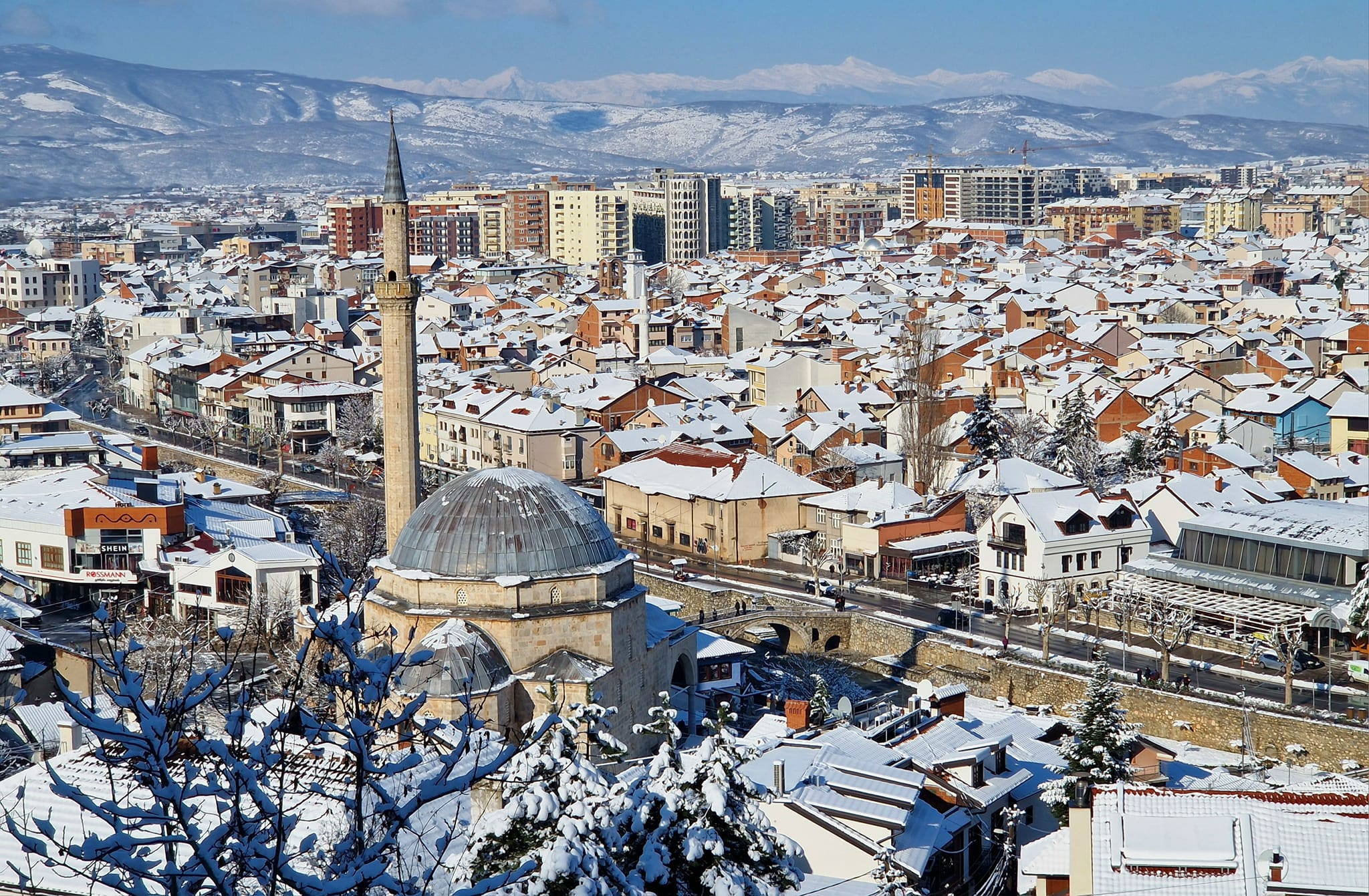
Panorama from below the castle.
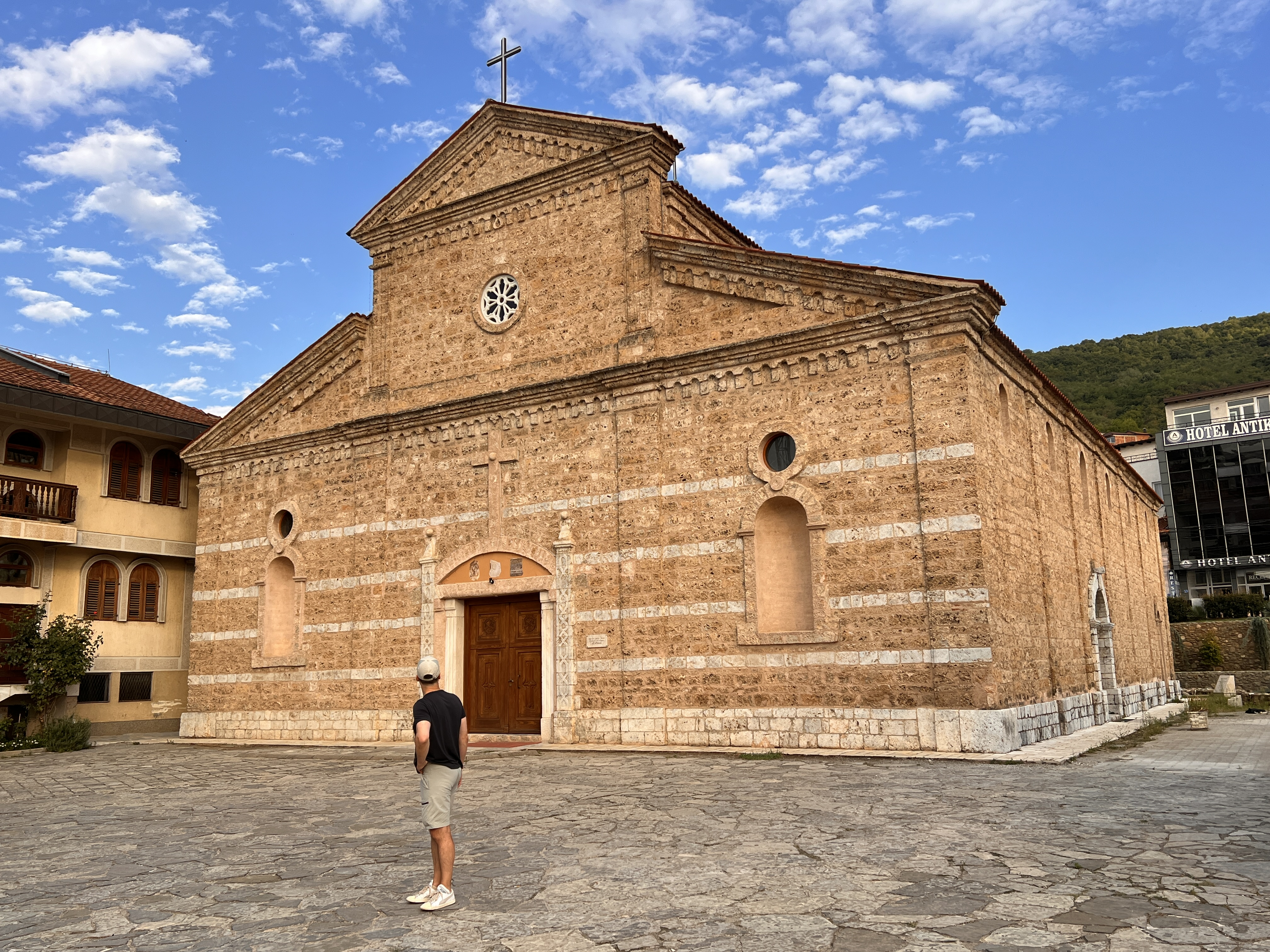
Catholic Cathedral of Our Lady of Perpetual Succor
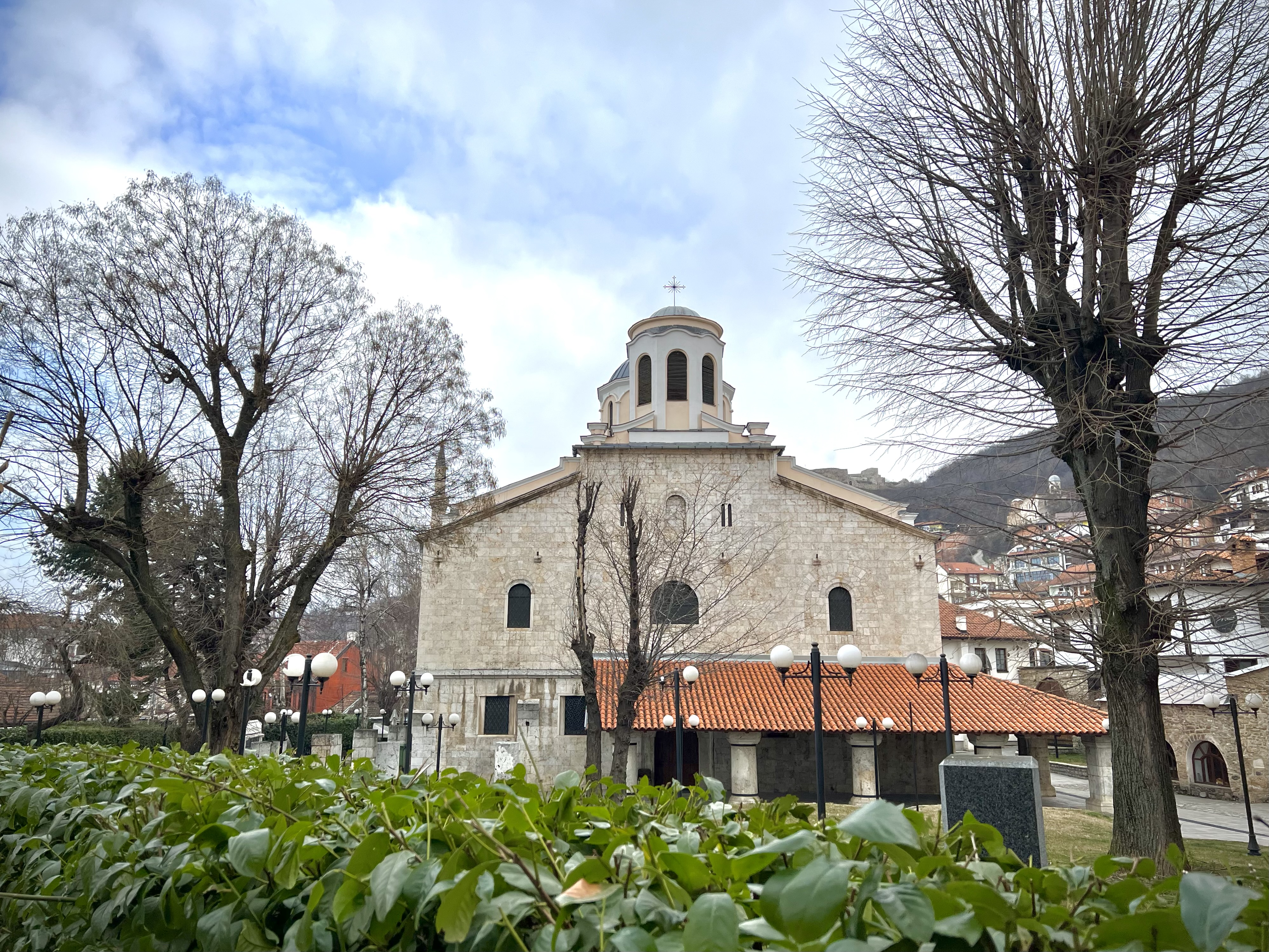
St.George Orthodox Cathedral

== Geography ==
Prizren is located on the foothills of the Šar Mountains (Albanian: Malet e Sharrit, Serbian Cyrillic: Шар-планина) in southern Kosovo on the banks of Prizren River. Prizren Municipality borders Albania to the southwest and North Macedonia to the southeast.

=== Climate ===
Prizren has a subtropical climate (Köppen climate classification Cfa) bordering a continental climate (Köppen climate classification Dfa) in the 0 °C isotherm and an oceanic climate (Köppen climate classification Cfb) in the -3 °C isotherm. with an average annual temperature of 11.8 °C (53.2 °F). The warmest month in Prizren is August with an average temperature of 22.2 °C (72.0 °F), while the coldest month is January with an average temperature of 0.0 °C (32.0 °F).

Climate data for Prizren (1961–1990)
Month	Jan	Feb	Mar	Apr	May	Jun	Jul	Aug	Sep	Oct	Nov	Dec	Year
Record high °C (°F)	20.2 (68.4)	22.4 (72.3)	26.0 (78.8)	31.3 (88.3)	33.8 (92.8)	40.6 (105.1)	40.8 (105.4)	37.3 (99.1)	35.8 (96.4)	31.4 (88.5)	25.6 (78.1)	23.7 (74.7)	40.8 (105.4)
Mean daily maximum °C (°F)	3.3 (37.9)	6.8 (44.2)	11.9 (53.4)	17.2 (63.0)	22.5 (72.5)	26.0 (78.8)	28.5 (83.3)	28.3 (82.9)	24.5 (76.1)	18.0 (64.4)	11.1 (52.0)	5.0 (41.0)	16.9 (62.4)
Daily mean °C (°F)	0.0 (32.0)	2.8 (37.0)	7.1 (44.8)	11.9 (53.4)	16.8 (62.2)	20.2 (68.4)	22.2 (72.0)	21.8 (71.2)	18.1 (64.6)	12.3 (54.1)	6.9 (44.4)	1.8 (35.2)	11.8 (53.2)
Mean daily minimum °C (°F)	−3.0 (26.6)	−0.6 (30.9)	2.7 (36.9)	6.9 (44.4)	11.3 (52.3)	14.4 (57.9)	15.8 (60.4)	15.4 (59.7)	12.1 (53.8)	7.3 (45.1)	3.2 (37.8)	−1.0 (30.2)	7.1 (44.8)
Record low °C (°F)	−23.6 (−10.5)	−19.1 (−2.4)	−11.7 (10.9)	−2.6 (27.3)	−0.4 (31.3)	3.8 (38.8)	7.3 (45.1)	7.0 (44.6)	−0.8 (30.6)	−4.3 (24.3)	−12.6 (9.3)	−17.4 (0.7)	−23.6 (−10.5)
Average precipitation mm (inches)	76.2 (3.00)	54.1 (2.13)	63.5 (2.50)	61.1 (2.41)	66.7 (2.63)	69.7 (2.74)	58.6 (2.31)	127.4 (5.02)	58.2 (2.29)	55.1 (2.17)	88.3 (3.48)	81.1 (3.19)	860.0 (33.86)
Average precipitation days (≥ 0.1 mm)	12.8	12.1	12.1	12.8	12.3	11.6	8.9	7.5	8.1	9.3	12.6	13.5	133.6
Average snowy days	7.6	5.6	3.8	0.4	0.0	0.0	0.0	0.0	0.0	0.1	2.1	5.8	25.4
Average relative humidity (%)	81	75	68	64	64	61	58	59	67	74	79	82	69
Mean monthly sunshine hours	100.2	92.0	139.4	176.2	224.5	290.7	300.8	285.7	220.7	163.4	89.7	54.1	2,137.4
Source: Republic Hydrometeorological Service of Serbia

== Governance ==
Prizren is a municipality governed by a mayor–council system. The mayor of Prizren with the members of the Prizren Municipal Council are responsible for the administration of Prizren Municipality. The municipality is encompassed in Prizren District and consists of 76 adjacent settlements with Prizren as its seat.

=== International relations ===
Prizren is twinned with: (Note: Citations regarding the twin or sister cities of Prizren:)

- Amasya, Turkey
- Balıkesir, Turkey
- Berat, Albania
- Beykoz, Turkey
- Bingen am Rhein, Germany
- Council Bluffs, Iowa, USA
- Herceg Novi, Montenegro
- Karşıyaka, Turkey
- Kavarna, Bulgaria
- Kyjov, Czech Republic
- Osijek, Croatia

Turkey and Hungary have also a general consulate in Prizren.

== Economy ==
There are three agricultural co-operatives in three villages. Most livestock breeding and agricultural production are private, informal, and small-scale. There are nine operational banks with branches in Prizren, ProCredit Bank, the Raiffeisen Bank, the NLB Bank, TEB Bank, Banka për Biznes (Bank for Business), İşbank, Banka Kombëtare Tregtare (National Trade Bank), Iutecredit, and the Payment and Banking Authority of Kosovo (BPK).

== Infrastructure ==
All the main roads connecting the major villages with the urban centre are asphalted. The water supply is functional in Prizren town and in approximately 30 villages.

=== Education ===
There are 48 primary schools with 28,205 pupils and 1,599 teachers; 6 secondary schools with 9,608 students and 503 teachers; kindergartens are privately run. There is also a public university in Prizren; the University of Prizren, offering lectures in Albanian, Bosnian, and Turkish.

=== Health ===
The primary health care system includes 14 municipal family health centres and 26 health houses. The primary health sector has 475 employees, including doctors, nurses and support staff, 264 females and 211 males. Regional hospital in Prizren offers services to approximately 250,000 residents. The hospital employs 778 workers, including 155 doctors, and is equipped with emergency and intensive care units.

== Demography ==
Historical population
Year	Pop.	±% p.a.
1948	20,540	—
1953	22,997	+2.29%
1961	28,062	+2.52%
1971	41,681	+4.04%
1981	61,801	+4.02%
1991	92,303	+4.09%
2011	85,119	−0.40%
2024	76,850	−0.78%
Source: Kosovo Agency of Statistics

As of the Kosovo Agency of Statistics (KAS) estimate from the 2011 census, there were 177,781 people residing in Prizren Municipality, representing the second most populous city and municipality of Kosovo. Its urban population was approximately 94,500, while the rural population was around 83,000. With a population density of 283,5 people per square kilometre, Prizren is among the most densely populated municipalities of Kosovo.

In terms of ethnicity, Prizren Municipality was 81.96% Albanian, 9.5% Bosniak, 5.11% Turkish, 1.63% Romani, 0.76% Ashkali, 0.37% Gorani, 0.13% Serbian, 0.09% Egyptian and 0.45% of other ethnicities or refugees (such as Afghans, Syrians, Ukrainians and others).

By religion, there were 170,640 (95.98%) Muslims, 5,999 (3.37%) Roman Catholics, 250 (0.14%) Orthodox, 807 (0.45%) of other religions and 85 (0.05%) irreligious.

Besides the two official languages of Kosovo, Albanian and Serbian, Turkish and Bosnian are also the official languages of the Municipality of Prizren.

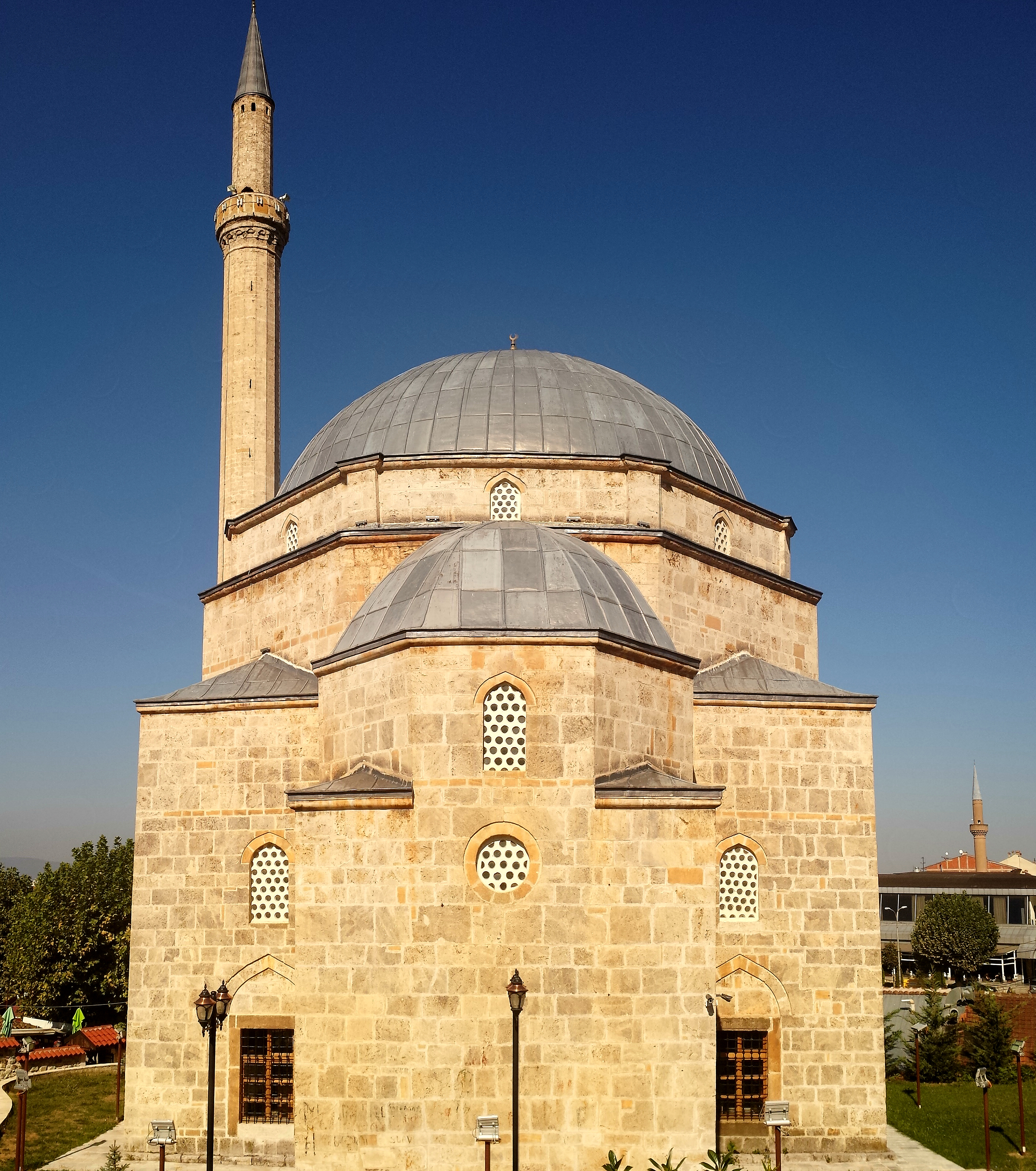
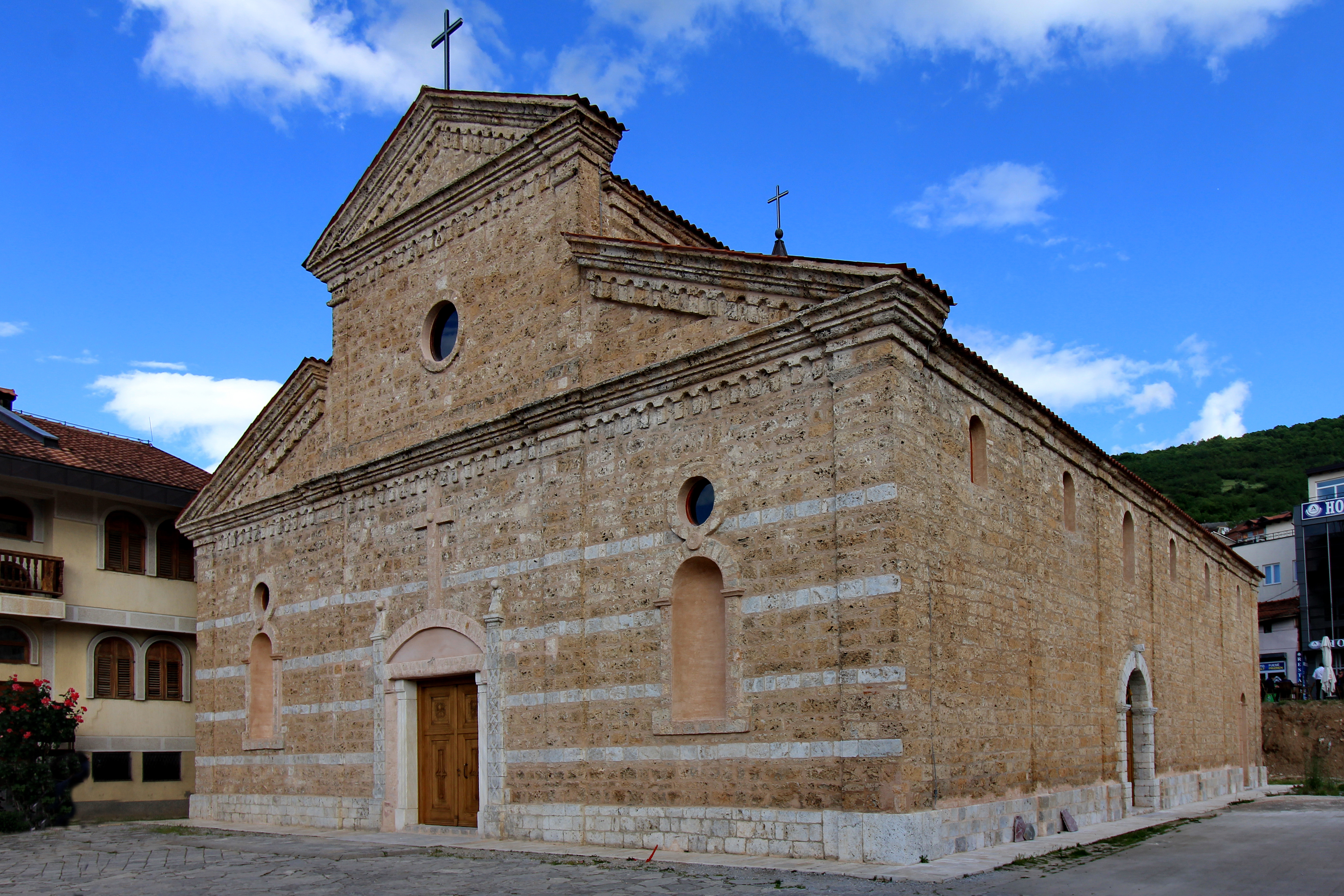
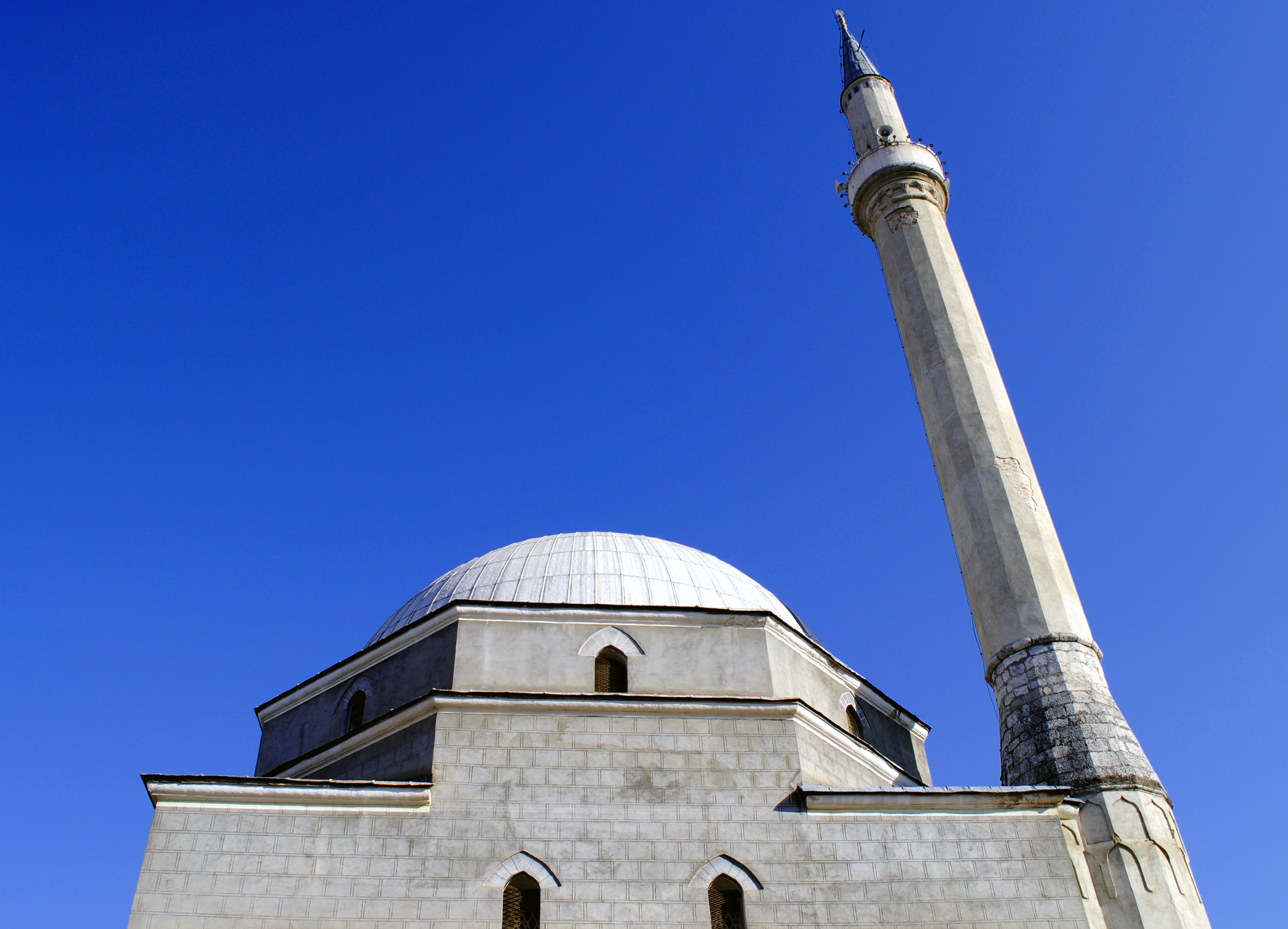
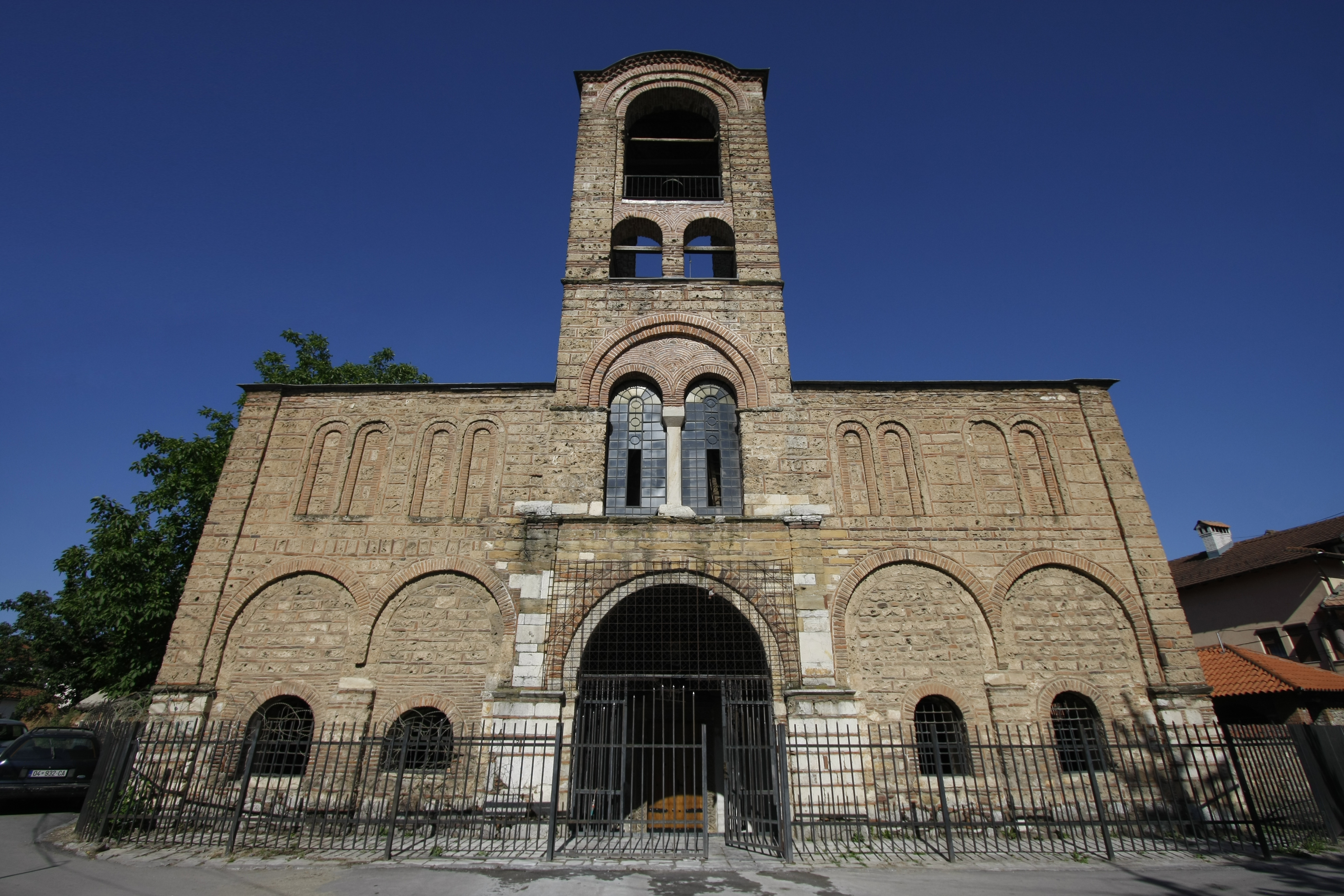
From top to bottom, left to right: The Sinan Pasha Mosque, the Roman Catholic Cathedral of Our Lady of Perpetual Succour, Gazi Mehmet Pasha Mosque, and the Serbian Orthodox Our Lady of Ljeviš church.

The presence of Vlach villages in the vicinity of Prizren is attested in 1198-1199 by a charter of Stephan Nemanja. Madgearu argues that the series of Ottoman defters from 1455 onward showing the "ethnic mosaic" of Serb and Albanian villages in Kosovo shows that Prizren already had significant Albanian Muslim populations. Since an early period in its rapid development as an Ottoman city, Prizren had much more Muslims than Catholic or Orthodox inhabitants as in the pre-Ottoman period.

Due to urban development in the Ottoman period, with the building of mosques and other Islamic buildings, Prizren received an Islamic urban character in the 16th century. 227 of 246 workshops of Prizren were run by Muslims in 1571. Catholic archbishop Marino Bizzi reported in 1610 that Prizren had 8,600 houses, out of which many were Orthodox (who had two churches), and only 30 were Catholic (who had one church). The Orthodox far outnumbered the Catholics. Catholic archbishop Pjetër Mazreku reported in 1624 that the town was inhabited by 12,000 "Turks" (Muslims, i.e. mainly Albanians) of which most spoke Albanian, and that there were 600 Serbs (Orthodox Christians) and maybe 200 Catholic Albanians. In 1857, Russian Slavist Alexander Hilferding's publications place the Muslim families at 3,000, the Orthodox ones at 900 and the Catholics at around 100 families. In the Ottoman census of 1876, it had 43,922 inhabitants.

Demographics by settlement
Rank	Name	Population	Males	Females	Albanians	Serbs	Turks	Bosniaks	Roma	Ashkali	Gorani	Others
1	Prizreni	85,119	42,161	42,958	67,283	47	8,833	4,914	2,666	800	576	204
2	Dushanovë	9,398	4,723	4,675	8,816	0	0	220	172	186	0	2
3	Lubizhdë	5,982	3,058	2,924	4,224	5	237	1,286	48	0	75	107
4	Zhur	5,909	2,974	2,935	5,903	0	0	6	0	0	0	0
5	Korishë	5,279	2,705	2,574	5,279	0	0	0	0	0	0	0
6	Gjonaj	4,818	2,431	2,387	4,812	1	0	4	0	1	0	0
7	Hoçë e Qyteti	3,410	1,681	1,729	3,409	0	0	1	0	0	0	0
8	Romajë	2,747	1,377	1,370	2,747	0	0	0	0	0	0	0
9	Lubizhdë e Hasit	2,719	1,410	1,309	1761	2,719	0	0	0	0	0	0
10	Piranë	2,417	1,255	1,162	2,216	0	0	0	0	201	0	0
11	Kushnin	2,110	1,048	1,062	2,110	0	0	0	0	0	0	0
12	Lubinjë e Epërme	1,925	981	944	0	0	0	1873	0	0	1	51
13	Zym	1,782	920	862	1782	0	0	0	0	0	0	0
14	Vlashnjë	1,700	848	852	1,699	0	0	1	0	0	0	0
15	Atmaxhë	1,685	867	818	1684	1	0	0	0	0	0	0
16	Krajk	1,676	872	804	1,676	0	0	0	0	0	0	0
17	Lubiqevë	1,602	779	823	1602	0	0	0	0	0	0	0
18	Poslishtë	1,520	740	780	1520	0	0	0	0	0	0	0
19	Billushë	1,495	781	714	1493	0	0	2	0	0	0	0
20	Nashec	1,379	717	662	1,379	0	0	0	0	0	0	0
21	Gërnçar	1,318	665	653	27	0	6	1,285	0	0	0	0
22	Lubinjë e Poshtme	1,227	609	618	32	0	0	1178	0	0	0	17
23	Lutogllavë	1,218	630	588	1218	0	0	0	0	0	0	0
24	Petrovë	1,194	605	589	1,914	0	0	0	0	0	0	0
25	Shpenadi	1,168	614	554	432	1089	0	0	0	58	0	0
26	Landovicë	1,149	581	568	1,038	0	0	1	0	110	0	0
27	Randobravë	1,142	569	573	1142	0	0	0	0	0	0	0
28	Mushnikovë	1,133	580	553	939	47	0	143	0	0	0	4
29	Skorobishtë	1,128	577	581	825	0	0	303	0	0	0	0
30	Manastiricë	1,107	550	557	317	0	0	0	1106	0	0	1
31	Pllanjan	1,104	582	522	298	13	4	7	1080	0	0	0
32	Karashëngjergj	1,099	563	536	1097	2	0	0	0	0	0	0
33	Mazrekë	1,077	549	528	1,077	0	0	0	0	0	0	0
34	Medvec	1,062	529	533	1046	0	0	0	0	16	0	0
35	Reçan	951	478	473	3	0	2	944	0	0	0	2
36	Krushë e Vogël	937	421	516	923	0	0	0	0	15	0	0
37	Grazhdanik	884	442	442	879	0	0	0	2	3	0	0
38	Kabash i Hasit	882	459	423	881	0	0	1	0	0	0	0
39	Caparc	848	436	412	820	0	0	0	0	28	0	0
40	Zojz	828	412	416	813	0	0	0	0	15	0	0
41	Shkozë	788	405	383	785	0	0	2	0	0	1	0
42	Malësi e Re	742	394	348	742	0	0	0	0	0	0	0
43	Pouskë	684	367	317	0	0	0	684	0	0	0	0
44	Pllanejë	681	341	340	681	0	0	0	0	0	0	0
45	Sërbicë e Poshtme	674	351	323	602	0	0	2	39	31	0	0
46	Vërmicë	661	327	334	661	430	0	0	0	0	0	0
47	Dedaj	619	318	301	616	0	3	0	0	0	0	0
48	Nebregoshtë	579	288	291	2	0	0	577	0	0	0	0
49	Lukinaj	558	297	261	558	0	0	0	0	0	0	0
50	Muradem	515	270	245	515	0	0	0	0	0	0	0
51	Kojushë	509	264	245	506	0	0	0	0	3	0	0
52	Dobrushtë	495	262	233	495	0	0	0	0	0	0	0
53	Velezhë	460	243	217	460	0	0	0	0	0	0	0
54	Jeshkovë	434	223	211	434	0	0	0	0	0	0	0
55	Tupec	398	202	196	398	0	0	0	0	0	0	0
56	Smaç	375	190	185	374	1	0	0	0	0	0	0
57	Jabllanicë	351	177	174	0	0	1	346	0	0	0	0
58	Llokvicë	339	173	166	1	5	0	333	0	0	0	0
59	Novosellë	309	167	142	17	0	0	243	0	0	0	49
60	Gornjasellë	292	152	140	12	9	0	268	0	0	0	3
61	Gorozhup	290	144	146	289	0	0	1	0	0	0	0
62	Sërbicë e Epërme	179	88	91	179	0	0	0	0	0	0	0
63	Drajçiq	151	70	81	30	26	0	95	0	0	0	0
64	Trepetnicë	138	68	70	133	0	0	0	0	5	0	0
65	Leskovec	134	67	67	134	0	0	0	0	0	0	0
66	Struzhë	42	60	102	0	0	0	0	0	0	0	0
67	Novak	88	47	41	57	31	0	0	0	0	0	0
68	Sredskë	69	40	29	9	58	2	0	0	0	0	0
69	Milaj	37	19	18	37	0	0	0	0	0	0	0
70	Lez	2	1	1	2	0	0	0	0	0	0	0
71	Dojnicë	-	-	-	-	-	-	-	-	-	-	-
72	Kabash	-	-	-	-	-	-	-	-	-	-	-
73	Kushtendil	-	-	-	-	-	-	-	-	-	-	-
74	Kobajë	-	-	-	-	-	-	-	-	-	-	-
75	Vërbiçan	-	-	-	-	-	-	-	-	-	-	-
76	Zhivinjan	-	-	-	-	-	-	-	-	-	-	-

== Culture ==
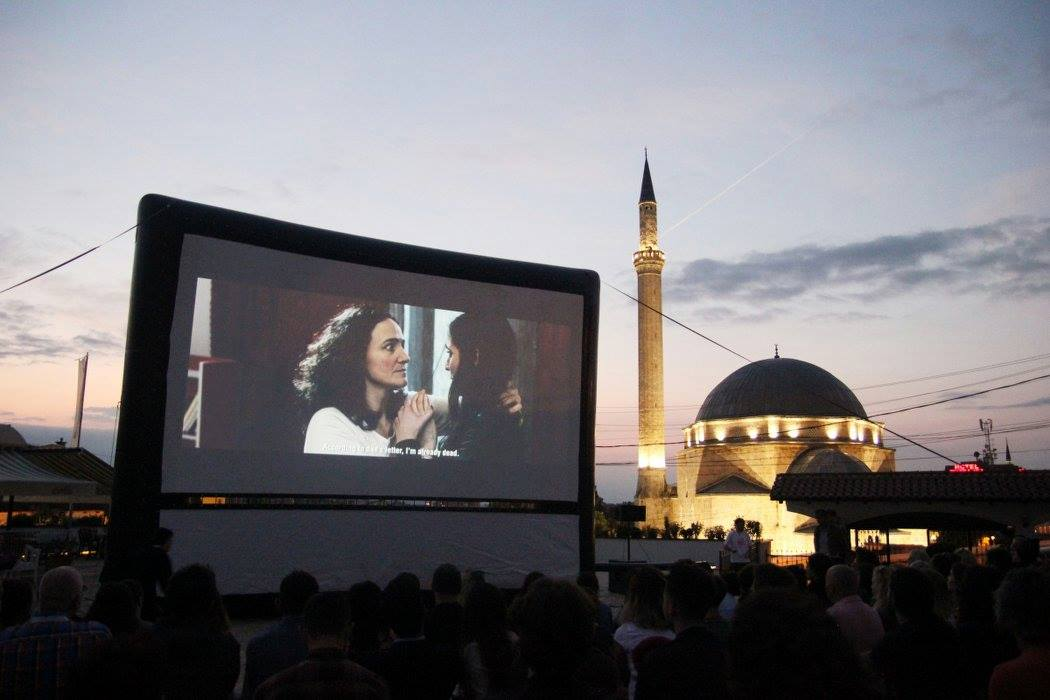
The Dokufest International Film Festival is held annually since 2002.

Regarded as the historical capital of Kosovo, Prizren has been home to many different religions and cultures for centuries, shaping the cultural heritage of the city. Prizren is also considered as a museum city with many mosques, churches and old buildings of national importance. The Fortress of Prizren located above the Prizren River has seen habitation and use throughout different periods since the Bronze Age. Among the artifacts of the Middle Ages are the Sinan Pasha Mosque, Saint George Cathedral, Our Lady of Perpetual Succour Cathedral, Holy Saviour Church, Katip Sinan Qelebi Mosque, Holy Archangels Monastery, St. Nicholas Church, Muderiz Ali Effendi Mosque and the UNESCO World Heritage Site Our Lady of Ljeviš.

=== Festivals ===
The annually held Hasi Jehon Festival aims to promote and preserve the Albanian spiritual heritage, through folk music, dances and popular games from all Albanian-inhabited parts of the Balkans. The festival was first established in the May of 1976 from the cultural and artistic association "Malësori" and it takes place in the village of Gjonaj.

The annual Dokufest International Film Festival held in Prizren is considered among the largest publicly attended film festival in the Balkans. Several art and music festivals and conferences are held in the city, including the 40BunarFest and NGOM Fest, with the main objectives to promote artists and to connect the different ethnic groups in the surrounding region.

=== Sports ===
The city has one association football club called KF Liria. They currently play in the First Football League of Kosovo. The city is also home to one of the basketball teams in Kosovo, K.B Bashkimi.

=== Religion ===
The influence of Islam in Kosovo is evident; 96% of the population identified as Muslim in the most recent census, taken in 2011. Mosques, such as the Sinan Pasha Mosque, are a dominant feature in the city.

== See also ==
- List of people from Prizren
- List of monuments in Prizren

== Bibliography ==
- Elsie, Robert (2011). Historical dictionary of Kosovo (2nd ed.). Lanham, MD: Scarecrow Press. ISBN 978-0-8108-7483-1.
- Fine, John V. A. (John Van Antwerp) (1994). The Late Medieval Balkans: Critical Survey from the Late Twelfth Century to the Ottoman Conquest. University of Michigan Press. ISBN 978-0-472-08260-5.
- Galaty, Michael; Lafe, Ols; Lee, Wayne; Tafilica, Zamir (2013). Light and Shadow: Isolation and Interaction in the Shala Valley of Northern Albania. The Cotsen Institute of Archaeology Press. ISBN 978-1931745710.
- Machiel, Kiel (1990). Ottoman Architecture in Albania, 1385-1912. Research Centre for Islamic History, Art and Culture. ISBN 9290633301.
- Malcolm, Noel (1998). Kosovo: A Short History. Macmillan. ISBN 978-0-333-66612-8.
- Malcolm, Noel (2020). Rebels, Believers, Survivors: Studies in the History of the Albanians. Oxford University Press. ISBN 978-0192599223.
- McGeer, Eric (2019). Byzantium in the Time of Troubles: The Continuation of the Chronicle of John Skylitzes (1057-1079). BRILL. ISBN 978-9004419407.
- Hoxha, Gëzim (2007). "Të dhëna të reja arkeologjike nga Kalaja e Prizrenit / Nouvelles données archéologiques sur la forteresse de Prizren". Iliria. 33: 33. doi:10.3406/iliri.2007.1073.
- Novaković, R (1966). "O nekim pitanjima područja današnje Metohije krajem XII i početkom XIII veka". Zbornik Radova Vizantološkog Instituta. 9: 195–215.
- Prinzing, Günter (2008). "Demetrios Chomatenos, Zu seinem Leben und Wirken". Demetrii Chomateni Ponemata diaphora: [Das Aktencorpus des Ohrider Erzbischofs Demetrios. Einleitung, kritischer Text und Indices]. Walter de Gruyter. ISBN 978-3110204506.
- Rrezja, Agon (2011). "Zhupa e Podrimës sipas burimeve cirilike të shek. XII-XV / District of Podrima according to Cyrillic sources of the 12th-15th centuries". Gjurmime Albanologjike. 41–42. Albanological Institute of Pristina.
- Stojkovski, Boris (2020). "Byzantine military campaigns against Serbian lands and Hungary in the second half of the eleventh century.". In Theotokis, Georgios; Meško, Marek (eds.). War in Eleventh-Century Byzantium. Routledge. ISBN 978-0429574771.
- Shukriu, Edi (2006). "Spirals of the prehistoric open rock painting from Kosova". Proceedings of the XV World Congress of the International Union for Prehistoric and Protohistoric Sciences. 35. Archived from the original on 2021-09-14.
