= Pllanejë =

Pllanejë: Pllanejë (Albanian)
- Village
- Location within Kosovo
- Coordinates: 42.210766504818096°N 20.576534242741648°E
- Location: Kosovo
- District: Prizren
- Municipality: Prizren

Population (2024)
  - Total: 631
- Time zone: UTC+1 (CET)
  - Summer (DST): UTC+2 (CEST)

Pllanejë is a village in Prizren, Kosovo. It is situated near the villages of Milaj and Binaj.

== History ==
Pllanejë may have been mentioned as a village in the 14th century, referred to as Pllano/Pllana.

Pllanejë was mentioned in the Ottoman defters of 1452-53 and 1571 and was inhabited by an Albanian population.

Pllanejë was substantially destroyed during the Kosovo war in the 1990s, and most of its inhabitants were driven out of the village and into Albania. It is claimed that the Kosovo Liberation Army killed about 180 Yugoslav soldiers in the Pashtrik area of Pllanejë.
