= Poslishtë =

Poslishtë: Poslishtë (Albanian); Послиште/Poslište (Serbian)
- Village
- Location in Kosovo
- Location: Kosovo
- District: Prizren
- Municipality: Prizren

Population (2024)
  - Total: 693
- Time zone: UTC+1 (CET)
  - Summer (DST): UTC+2 (CEST)

Poslishtë (Albanian: Poslishta; Serbian: Послиште) is a village in the Prizren Municipality of Kosovo. The location is known for the nearby archaeological site, which was discovered in 2010.
