= Skorobishtë =

Skorobishtë Скоробиште Skorobište
- Village
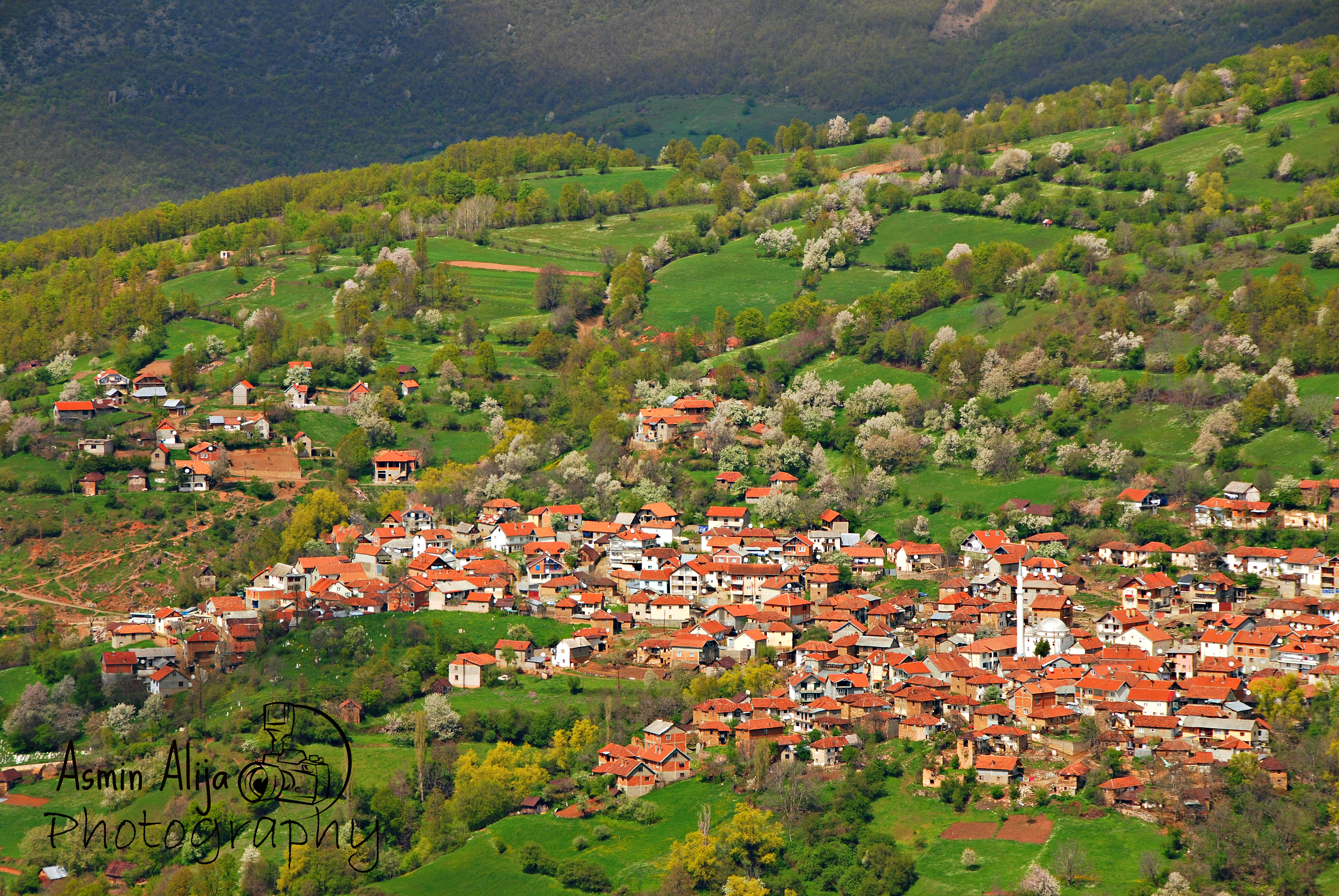
- Prizren Municipality

- Location in Kosovo
- Location: Kosovo
- District: Prizren
- Municipality: Prizren

Population (2024)
  - Total: 909
- Time zone: UTC+1 (CET)
  - Summer (DST): UTC+2 (CEST)

Skorobište (Serbian Cyrillic: Скоробиште, Albanian: Skorobishtë) or Skorobišta (Скоробишта) is a village in Prizren Municipality, Kosovo.

== Geography ==
It lies in the eastern slopes of the Kabash Mountain, at an altitude of 1185 m. It is part of the Prizrenski Podgor region. It is located near Prizren.

== Demographics ==
It had 909 inhabitants according to the 2024 census, with an Albanian majority and Bosniak minority.

== History ==
The village existed in the Serbian Middle Ages. It was mentioned in Emperor Stefan Dušan's charter dated 26 April 1348 as part of the metochion of the Church of St. Peter in Koriša to Hilandar, along with Planjane, Sishtevac, Črneljevo. There had been a quarrel between Skorobište, which was part of the estate of the Monastery of the Holy Archangels and Lubizhdë, which was part of the estate of the Church of St. Peter in Koriša, about a mountain access. From it, it is clear that the people of Skorobište mostly dealt with cattle breeding. Skorobište later became part of the estate of the Monastery of St. Peter in Koriša.

In the Ottoman period, the village was part of the Ljubinje bajrak. In 1874, it was reported that this historical Christian village had no Christian inhabitants. In 1877, the village had 60 families; the christian families had converted to islam 110 years prior (ca. 1767)as the majority of the Albanian population was muslim. The Christian population celebrated the Slava of Ignatius of Antioch, also called the "God-Bearer," on January 2nd. Even today, some Muslim families in the village of Skorobishtë, who originally were Orthodox Christians and converted to Islam around 1767, continue to mark January 2nd. However, they refer to it as the "Day of Stubbornness," which in Albanian is called "Dita Inatit," a derivative of the name "Ignatius." The fact that the day has been renamed but is still celebrated shows that the population has not forgotten its roots and maintains a connection to its cultural heritage despite religious changes. In 1882, there was an old Roman church in the Bajra Quarter, and a newly built school in the village, but no teachers. During the First World War the local Muslim school(Mektab) functioned, supported financially by Ottoman Ministry of Education(Maarif Vekâleti). The inhabitants strictly did not marry with Turks. The toponyms of the surrounding fields and areas, many of which are not of Slavic origin, suggest that the original population was Aromanian. This is supported by historical traces such as Romance place names associated with the Aromanian population in the area and the existence of an old Roman church.

The first Albanian families settled in Skorobište around the 15th century marking the start of significant demographic changes in the village. Ajdar from the Kastrati tribe arrived from Bele near Kukës with his sons Bajrë, Mulë, Sejdi, and Abaz, establishing a foothold for Albanians in the region. Shortly afterward, Rexhë from the Krasniqi tribe followed with his sons Jusuf and Tahir from the Highlanders of Gjakova. Over time, more families arrived, including the brothers Bal, Sal, and Ali from the Shala Tribe of Isniq. Bal and Sal were Christians, while their brother Ali was a converted Muslim. From Ali, the later surname Alija originated in the village. Later, a Christian Bulgarian family from Chirpan joined the community, settling in the Shala neighborhood. This family integrated into the village’s culture and landscape, contributing to the diversity of the region.

In the next wave of settlement, the Sopoti Brothers from Diber, Gjafer and Shaban, arrived and established their lineage in the village. Today, the descendants of Gjafer are known as Xhaferi, while those of Shaban are known as Shabani, reflecting their ancestry.

An Family from the Kryeziu Tribe with roots from Puka, Albania, also settled in Skorobishtë. The first member of this family, named Abdë, founded a separate line whose descendants are also named Shabani, though they have no direct kinship with the Shabani family from the Sopoti lineage. Around 1915 they leaved Skorobishtë and where going to Lubizhdë, where they changed their surname to Ramadani, the earliest descendants who settled in this village were Safet and Latif Ramadani.

A significant part of the current residents of Skorobishte trace their origins to the village of Mushnikova in the municipality of Prizren. After 1875, a woman named Emina Xhaferi returned to the village after her husband lost his life in the wars between the Ottoman Empire and Bulgaria. She returned with her three sons – Mislim, Skender, and Memish – as she was unable to support herself alone and settled near her family in Skorobishte. Today, there are a total of 29 families living in Skorobishte with origins in Mušnikovo, all belonging to the Thaçi clan. In the 1950s, Sait Ali Rexhaj from Kabash moved to Skorobište. His descendants now form three families and belong to the Thaçi clan of Kabash.

Originally, the residents of Skorobište used surnames based on their Albanian tribal affiliations, including names like Kastrati, Shala, Sopoti, Krasniqi, and Kryeziu. However, during the Yugoslav period, the Serbian government assigned Slavic surnames to the villagers as part of an attempt to suppress and erase their Albanian identity. These state-assigned names included Azarović, Smajlović, Ibrahimović, Gazović, Jasharević, Isaković, Bajramović, and others.

After the World War II, the villagers took steps to restore their Albanian cultural heritage by once again changing their surnames. This time, they selected names that reflected their original neighborhoods or ancestral figures. The current Bajra families are descended from the four Kastrati Brothers and are also known as "Gorani or Beljani". The Shala families are now known as Alija, including the descendants of the family from Chirpan known also as "Bugari", who also took this name. The descendants of Krasniqi are now called Jusufi (descendants of Jusuf) and Rexha (descendants of Tahir).The Sopoti Families are now called Shabani(descendants of Shaban) and Xhaferi(descendants of Xhafer). Which honored their family origins and ethnic identity. These changes were an important effort to preserve their cultural and historical roots, strengthening their identity amidst the shifting political and social context of the region.

Also after World War II, the Socialist Yugoslav (or Serbian) regime began confiscating forests in the Skorobište village area. From 1964 to 1966, this effort involved not only workers but also activists from the Communist League of Prizren, who attempted to convince and verbally pressure the villagers. The team worked and stayed at the Kopanavodë mountain lodge during this time.

The situation escalated, leading to organized protests by the residents of Skorobište. Villagers, including elderly women, marched 6 km to the lodge to confront the team. Shefka Rexha, The Mother of Azar Rexha together with her friend Ivka, threatened the team to leave immediately or face physical resistance. The protest forced the experts to withdraw and return to Prizren, never coming back.

Subsequently, the villagers filed complaints with authorities in Belgrade through lawyer Fila Filot. These complaints were upheld, and the forest ownership was restored to the local private owners. Thus, the forest around Skorobište remained privately owned.

In August 1958, below the Crni Vrh and above Skorobište, fields had been dug up and tens of thousands young plants had been removed and left, destroyed.

In 1999, during the Kosovo War, the villages of Skorobishte and Kabash in southern Kosovo became significant battlegrounds. In this region, the 125th Brigade of the Kosovo Liberation Army(KLA), led by Commander Ekrem Rexha(also known as Drini) and Lulzim Kabashi, mounted a determined resistance against the Yugoslav Army and pro-Serb militias.

The community of Skorobishte provided crucial support to the KLA, as much of Kosovo’s Albanian population stood behind the goals of the liberation movement. Fighters from the 125th Brigade established defensive lines and launched attacks to repel both the Yugoslav Army and armed Serb civilians from the nearby village of Dojnice. These Serb residents of Dojnice had armed themselves with the intent of attacking the people of Skorobishte and asserting control over the area. With the support of the local population, the 125th Brigade managed to withstand these attacks and push back the armed Serb groups, successfully defending the village.

== Demographics ==
The village is one of seven mixed Albanian-Bosniak villages near Prizren. The 1971 census saw the Slavic Muslim inhabitants being largely assimilated into Albanians. It had 1128 inhabitants according to the 2011 census, of whom 67,91% Albanians and 26,86% Bosniaks.

All of these families speak both Albanian and the southslavic Podgor dialect, which they have adapted to the language of other inhabitants of the area. This bilingualism reflects the integration, assimilation and coexistence between the Albanians and the Slavic population.

The bilingual speaking Muslim population, known as Podgorci or Prekokamci, living in Skorobishte, Grnçare, Lubizhdë, and Novo Selo, did not largely leave during and after the Kosovo War.

== Culture ==
The local Slavic speech (Podgorski) is part of the Prizren–South Morava speech, of the Shtokavian dialect of Serbo-Croatian. The Albanians speak the Northeastern Gheg sub-dialect of Albanian.

The culture and traditions of this Albanian village are deeply rooted in heritage.

Traditional Wedding Attire for Men; Men's wedding attire is simple yet distinctive. On their feet, they wear handmade leather shoes (opinga) or handcrafted shoes, paired with colorful woolen socks. They also wear tirq, traditional woolen trousers in dark brown, black, or white, often adorned with rows of decorative braids (gajtana). The këmisha malësore (a collarless mountain shirt) is fastened with clasps, while a long, multicolored woolen sash is wrapped around the waist. Other elements include a mintan (woolen vest with sleeves), a xhamadan (vest with decorative braids and vertical rows of buttons on both sides), and a pocket embroidered with braids.

A traditional accessory is the pocket watch with a chain, alongside the qelibari i duhanxhiut (amber cigarette holder), often tucked halfway into the sash. On their heads, men wear the qeleshe (traditional felt cap) or a fes.

Traditional Wedding Attire for Women; Women's attire includes handmade shoes (kundra) and woolen socks adorned with intricate motifs. Underneath, a long inner garment is worn. Other clothing pieces include the sari (a traditional skirt), skutaça (apron-like garments worn in the front), boça (a back piece), and the jeleku (vest) embroidered with madzhidi (silver coins).

Accessories include colorful necklaces and beadwork wrapped around the wrist, as well as a silk mafez (headpiece). On the head, women wear a cap adorned with beads and small

== Martyrs ==
1.Idriz Jusufi; was killed in 1913 by Serbs from the village of Vrbicane because he refused to hand over his rifle to them.

2.Azem Jusufi; was executed in 1913 by Serbian villagers from Ljubizda without any reason.

3.Rasim Jusufi; was killed in 1917 by Serbs from Korisha.

4.Jolxhe Xhaferi was killed in 1921 by Serbs from the village of Korisha, who were returning home from a wedding in Dojnice.

5. Selim Bilo Bajra was executed in 1925 by Serbian Gendarmerie in the village mosque of Skorobishte.

6. Amze Rexha died in 1925 from the effects of torture by the Serbian gendarmerie.

7. Usen Alija, born in 1930, was executed in 1942 at the age of 12 by family members of Uroš Blagojević from Dojnice. The case was made public in 2000, and Ilija Blagojević was identified as the murderer.

8. Zaim Bajra died in 1943 as a soldier of the SS Skanderbeg Division in Montenegro.

9. Sali Shabani, soldier of the SS Division, killed in 1943 in Prishtina from Serbian Partisans.

10. Nefit Jusufi, a Yugoslav police officer, was killed in 1946 by groups opposing the regime.

11. Sefçet Shabani was killed in 1988 in the forest of Skorobište; the murder remains unsolved to this day.

12. Xhiman Alija was forcibly recruited by Serbian units in 1991 and was shot in Croatia by fellow soldiers because he was Albanian.

13. Sinan Alija was forcibly taken in 1916 by Bulgarian soldiers and went missing between 1916 and 1918.

14. Esat Alija, born in 1885, was killed as a Turkish soldier in the Battle of Çanakkale in 1915.

15. Taip Fejzë Rexha, born in 1878, died as a sergeant in the Battle of Çanakkale in 1916.

16. Memet Fejzë Rexha died as a soldier in the Battle of Çanakkale.

17. Tefik Jusufi, born in 1875, was forcibly conscripted by the Bulgarian army and went missing between 1916 and 1918.

18. Rakip Shabani was forcibly conscripted by Bulgarian soldiers in 1916 and has been missing since 1918.

19. Asip Jusufi was also forcibly conscripted by Bulgarian soldiers and has been missing since 1918.

20. Zeça Rexha was forcibly conscripted by Bulgarian soldiers; he has been missing since 1918 as well.

== Personalities ==
• Mulla Selim (Bilo) Bajra (1875-1925), First Mufti (Muslim leader)

• Ekrem Rexha (1961-2000), KLA Commander
