= Zojz, Prizren =

Zojz Zojz
- Village
- Zojz
- Location within Kosovo
- Coordinates: 42°17′53″N 20°41′38″E
- Location: Kosovo
- District: Prizren
- Municipality: Prizren
- Elevation: 320 m (1,050 ft)

Population (2024)
  - Total: 534
- Time zone: UTC+1 (CET)
  - Summer (DST): UTC+2 (CEST)

Zojz (Albanian definite form: Zojzi; ) is a settlement in the Prizren Municipality, southwestern Kosovo.

== Etymology ==
The name of the village is believed to come from the Albanian word Zojz/Zoj

== History ==
The village of Zojz was mentioned in the Ottoman defter of the 16th century with the name Zojiq and the inhabitants of the village were recorded with characteristically Albanian anthroponomy.

== Geography ==
Zojz is placed roughly 10 km north of Prizren. Neighboring settlements are Smaç and Medvec to the east, Piranë to the west, Sërbica e Poshtme to the south and Randobrava to the north. The Topluha River and the Autostrada R 7 run south of the village.

== Demographics ==
According to the 2024 census Zojz had 534 inhabitants. Of them, 520 (97.37%) were Albanians and 13 were Ashkali. All 534 inhabitants declared themselves Muslims.
