= Sërbicë e Poshtme =

Sërbicë e Poshtme: Sërbicë e Poshtme (Albanian); Доња Србица/Donja Srbica (Serbian)
- Village
- Location in Kosovo
- Coordinates: 42°17′13″N 20°41′56″E
- Location: Kosovo
- District: Prizren
- Municipality: Prizren

Population (2024)
  - Total: 482
- Time zone: UTC+1 (CET)
  - Summer (DST): UTC+2 (CEST)

Sërbicë e Poshtme (Serbian Cyrillic: Доња Србица; Albanian: Sërbicë e Poshtme) is a village in the Prizren Municipality in southern Kosovo.

== History ==
First mentioned in a chrysobull by the Serbian Emperor Stefan Dušan in 1348, Sërbicë e Poshtme was known for having a well that supplied water to the surround villages. In 1940 the remains of an old church and cemetery were discovered in the village. In 1997 reconstruction and restoration works were conducted by the local Serbs who managed to rebuild the foundations of the church. However, in 1999 following the end of the Kosovo War, the church was destroyed.

A 1940 census of the village listed 42 households in total. It consisted of 16 Serbs (Christian Orthodox), 11 Muslims, 9 Albaniansz (6 of the Catholic faith, 3 of the Islamic faith), 5 Roma (Muslim faith) and 1 Turkish households:

- Serb – Djordjevic (2 homes), Cardaklije (2 homes), Bajkic (3 homes), Ljubisavci (1 home), Tomic (1 home), Borobanci (5 homes), Jovanovic (1 home), Markovic (1 home).
- Muslim – Cardaklije (3 homes), Isenovic (1 home), Zejnelovic (1 home), Abazovic (3 homes).
- Albanian – Muslim: Salja (1 home), Malici (1 home), Zecirovic (1 home); Catholic: Miriditi (6 homes).
- Roma – Unknown surname (5 homes).
- Turkish – Alimovic (1 home).

== Demographics ==
The village has a Kosovo Albanian majority.

Ethnicity	2011
Albanian	600
Ashkali	39
Egyptians	20
Roma	11
Bosniaks	2
Total	674

Religion

In 2011, Sërbice ë Poshtme had 674 people. 603 were Muslim (89.47%), 69 were Catholic (10,24%), 1 was Orthodox (0.15%).
