= Kushnin =

Kushnin: Kushnin (Albanian); Кушнин/Kušnin (Serbian)
- Village
- Location within Kosovo
- Coordinates: 42.275411°N 20.537186°E
- Location: Kosovo
- District: Prizren
- Municipality: Prizren
- Elevation: 370 m (1,210 ft)

Population (2024)
  - Total: 1,751
- Time zone: UTC+1 (CET)
  - Summer (DST): UTC+2 (CEST)

Kushnin (Albanian: Kushnin, Serbian Cyrillic: Кушнин/Kušnin) is a village in Prizren municipality, Kosovo.
