= Peqan =

Peçan: Peçan (Albanian); Пећане/Pećane (Serbian)
- Village
- Location within Kosovo
- Coordinates: 42.382499°N 20.823013°E
- Location: Kosovo
- District: Prizren
- Municipality: Suharekë
- Elevation: 462 m (1,516 ft)

Population (2024)
  - Total: 1,378
- Time zone: UTC+1 (CET)
  - Summer (DST): UTC+2 (CEST)

Peçan (Albanian: Peçan, Serbian Cyrillic: Пећане/Pećane) is a village in Suharekë municipality, Kosovo.
