= Sopi, Suva Reka =

Sopi: Sopi (Albanian); Сопина/Sopina (Serbian)
- Village
- Location within Kosovo
- Coordinates: 42.335606°N 20.843629°E
- Location: Kosovo
- District: Prizren
- Municipality: Suharekë
- Elevation: 473 m (1,552 ft)

Population (2024)
  - Total: 2,561
- Time zone: UTC+1 (CET)
  - Summer (DST): UTC+2 (CEST)

Sopi or Sopijë (Albanian: Sopi, Serbian Cyrillic: Сопина/Sopina) is a village in Suharekë municipality, Kosovo.
