= Lubizhdë e Hasit =

Lubizhdë e Hasit: Lubizhdë e Hasit (Albanian); Љубижда Хас/Ljubižda Has (Serbian)
- Village
- Location within Kosovo
- Coordinates: 42.250550°N 20.617239°E
- Location: Kosovo
- District: Prizren
- Municipality: Prizren
- Elevation: 749 m (2,457 ft)

Population (2024)
  - Total: 2,444
- Time zone: UTC+1 (CET)
  - Summer (DST): UTC+2 (CEST)

Lubizhdë e Hasit (Albanian: Lubizhdë e Hasit, Serbian Cyrillic: Љубижда Хас/Ljubižda Has) is a village in the Prizren municipality of Kosovo.

== Background ==
The village was mentioned in the Ottoman defter of 1571 with 40 homes. The inhabits bore typical Albanian names, indicating that the village was inhabited by a Christian Albanian population.
