= Kojushë =

Kojushë: Kojushë (Albanian); Којуш (Serbian)
- village
- Location within Kosovo
- Coordinates: 42.227°N 20.609°E
- Location: Kosovo
- District: Prizren
- Municipality: Prizren

Population (2024)
  - Total: 574
- Time zone: UTC+1 (CET)
  - Summer (DST): UTC+2 (CEST)

Kojushë is a village in the Prizren District of Kosovo. The village is part of the Has region.

== History ==
Kojushë was mentioned as a village in the Ottoman defters of 1452-53 and 1571 and was inhabited by a Christian Albanian population with 29 households.
