= Krajk =

Village in Prizren, Kosovo

- Village
- Location within Kosovo
- Coordinates: 42.28308661432063°N 20.660240621573546°E
- Location: Kosovo
- District: Prizren
- Municipality: Prizren

Population (2024)
  - Total: 1,469
- Time zone: UTC+1 (CET)
  - Summer (DST): UTC+2 (CEST)

Krajk is a village in Prizren, Kosovo. Krajk is situated nearby to the hamlet Basarinë and the village Pirane. It was mentioned as a village in the Ottoman defter of 1571 and was inhabited by an Albanian population.
