= Zym =

Zym: Zym (Albanian); Zjum (Serbian)
- Village
- Location in Kosovo
- Country: Kosovo
- District: Prizren
- Municipality: Prizren

Population (2024)
  - Total: 520
- Time zone: UTC+1 (CET)
  - Summer (DST): UTC+2 (CEST)

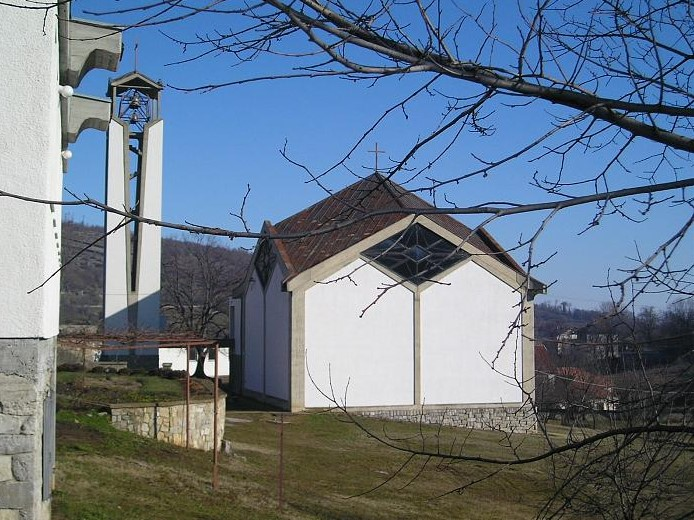
Catholic Church of Zym

Zym (in Albanian) or Zjum (in Serbian; Зјум) is a village in the Prizren Municipality of southwestern Kosovo.

== Geography ==
The settlement lies in the eastern part of the Has region in Kosovo, known as Prizren Has (the other being Gjakova Has).

== History ==
In the Ottoman Defter of 1485, Zym was part of the Nahiya of Pashtrik, and it was also known as Zybofic. The inhabitants of Zym had an overwhelmingly Christian Albanian anthroponomy with a degree of Islamisation: Ali Kola, Biba Gjoni, Nina Koka, Gjin Dusha, Baç Prendi, Doda Tita (Dida), Bac Doçi, Kosta Shtefani, Gjec Doçi, Koka Peka, Prend Nina, Gika Marku, Prend Andrea, Doç Daba, Deja Papa, Gika Daka, Gjec Gika, Papa Doçi, Deda Prendi, Iljas Doda, Gjin Doçi, Koka Papa, Tita (Dida) Deja, Prend Papa, Gjon Papa, Mark Deja. There were 21 homes in total.

During the Kingdom of Yugoslavia, Zym was the center of a srez (municipality). During FR Yugoslavia (Serbia and Montenegro), the settlement was known as Zjum Has (Зјум Хас, Zym i Hasit), in order to differentiate from Zjum Opoljski in Opolje. Zjum Opoljski was founded by settlers from Zjum Has.

== Demographics ==
According to the 2024 census, it had 520 inhabitants, all Albanians.

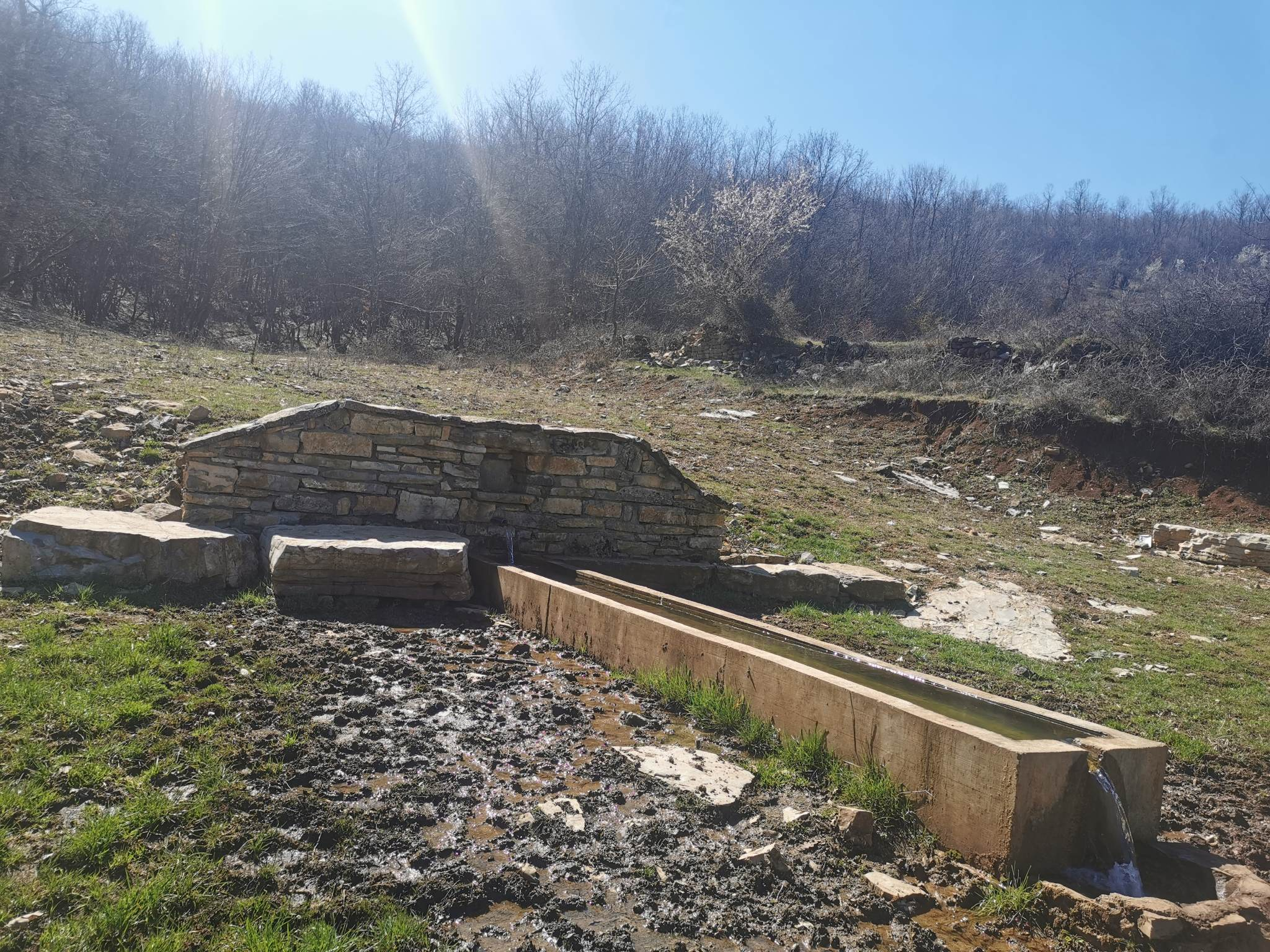
Kroi i fshatit ne zym

== Sources ==
- Milenko S. Filipović (1958). Хас под Паштриком. Сарајевски граф. завод. pp. 107–.
- Srboljub Đ Stamenković (2001). Географска енциклопедија насеља Србије: М-Р. Универзитет у Београду. Географски факултет. ISBN 978-86-82657-15-6.
