= Gorozhup =

Gorozhup: Gorozhup (Albanian)
- Village
- Location within Kosovo
- Coordinates: 42.17850983381279°N 20.546218998324065°E
- Location: Kosovo
- District: Prizren
- Municipality: Prizren

Population (2024)
  - Total: 2 sa 200
- Time zone: UTC+1 (CET)
  - Summer (DST): UTC+2 (CEST)

Gorozhup is a village in District of Prizren, Kosovo. Gorozhup is situated nearby to the villages Tejec and Binaj.

Gorozhup was mentioned in the Ottoman defters of 1452-53 and 1571, and was inhabited by an Albanian population.
