= Piranë =

Piranë: Piranë (Albanian); Пиране/Pirane (Serbian)
- Village
- Location within Kosovo
- Coordinates: 42.292198°N 20.673641°E
- Location: Kosovo
- District: Prizren
- Municipality: Prizren
- Elevation: 302 m (991 ft)

Population (2024)
  - Total: 1,853
- Time zone: UTC+1 (CET)
  - Summer (DST): UTC+2 (CEST)

Piranë (Albanian: Piranë, Serbian Cyrillic: Пиране/Pirane) is a village in Prizren municipality, Kosovo.

== History ==
According to Pulaha, Pirane was mentioned in the Ottoman defter of 1485 as Dolina Biranash with 35 homes, several of the homes listed bore Albanian names: Bashtina e Gjinit, te birit te Tanushit, Bashtina e Progonit, Bashtina e Nikces, E veja Nina, Nika son of Dabzhiv.

During the 16th century, the inhabitants of the village were recorded with characteristically Albanian anthroponomy, indicating that the village was historically inhabited by Albanians.
