= Petrovë =

Petrovë: Petrovë (Albanian); Петрово/Petrovo (Serbian)
- Village
- Location within Kosovo
- Coordinates: 42.405455°N 21.039234°E
- Location: Kosovo
- District: Ferizaj
- Municipality: Shtime
- Elevation: 604 m (1,982 ft)

Population (2024)
  - Total: 2,135
- Time zone: UTC+1 (CET)
  - Summer (DST): UTC+2 (CEST)

Petrovë (Albanian: Petrovë, Serbian Cyrillic: Петрово/Petrovo) is a village in Shtime municipality, Kosovo.
