= Shpenadi =

- Village
- Location within Kosovo
- Coordinates: 42.273°N 20.756°E
- Location: Kosovo
- District: Prizren
- Elevation: 438 m (1,437 ft)

Population (2011)
  - Total: 1,168
- Time zone: UTC+1 (CET)
  - Summer (DST): UTC+2 (CEST)

Shpenadi is a village in the District of Prizren, in Kosovo.

== History ==
Shpenadi was mentioned as an Arbanas (Albanian) settlement in a medieval document from 1348. The village Shpenadi is also mentioned in the Ottoman defter of 1591 as 'Shpinadija'.
