= Milaj =

Milaj: Milaj (Albanian)
- Village
- Location within Kosovo
- Coordinates: 42.197288200519324°N 20.55818795453719°E
- Location: Kosovo
- District: Prizren
- Municipality: Prizren

Population (2024)
  - Total: 0
- Time zone: UTC+1 (CET)
  - Summer (DST): UTC+2 (CEST)

Milaj is a village in Prizren, Kosovo, within the area of the Has region. The village is around 30km away from the town of Prizren.

Milaj was mentioned as a village in the Ottoman defters of 1452-52 and 1571 and was historically inhabited by an Albanian population.

Over the years, the village has been abandoned, and according to a news article from Kosovo there was only one family in the village as of 2023.
