= Caparc =

Caparc: Caparc (Albanian); Цапарце (Serbian)
- village
- Location within Kosovo
- Coordinates: 42.286°N 20.769°E
- Location: Kosovo
- District: Prizren

Population (2024)
  - Total: 591
- Time zone: UTC+1 (CET)
  - Summer (DST): UTC+2 (CEST)

Caparc is a village in the district of Prizren, Kosovo.

== History ==
Caparc is mentioned in the 1348 Stefan Dusan chrysobull together with eight other Catholic Albanian villages in the area. The village Caparc was also mentioned in the Ottoman defter of 1591 as 'Caparca' and the village was recorded then with 12 households.
