= District of Prizren =

District of Kosovo

District of Prizren: Rajoni i Prizrenit (Albanian) Prizrenski okrug/ Призренски округ (Serbian) Prizren Bölgesi (Turkish)
- District of Kosovo
- Location of Prizren District in Kosovo
- Interactive map of District of Prizren
- Country: Kosovo
- Capital: Prizren

Area
  - Total: 1,397 km^{2} (539 sq mi)

Population (2011 census)
  - Total: 331,670
  - Rank: 2nd
  - Density: 237.4/km^{2} (614.9/sq mi)
- Postal code: 20000
- Vehicle registration: 04
- Municipalities: 5
- Settlements: 195
- HDI (2023): 0.785 high · 6th

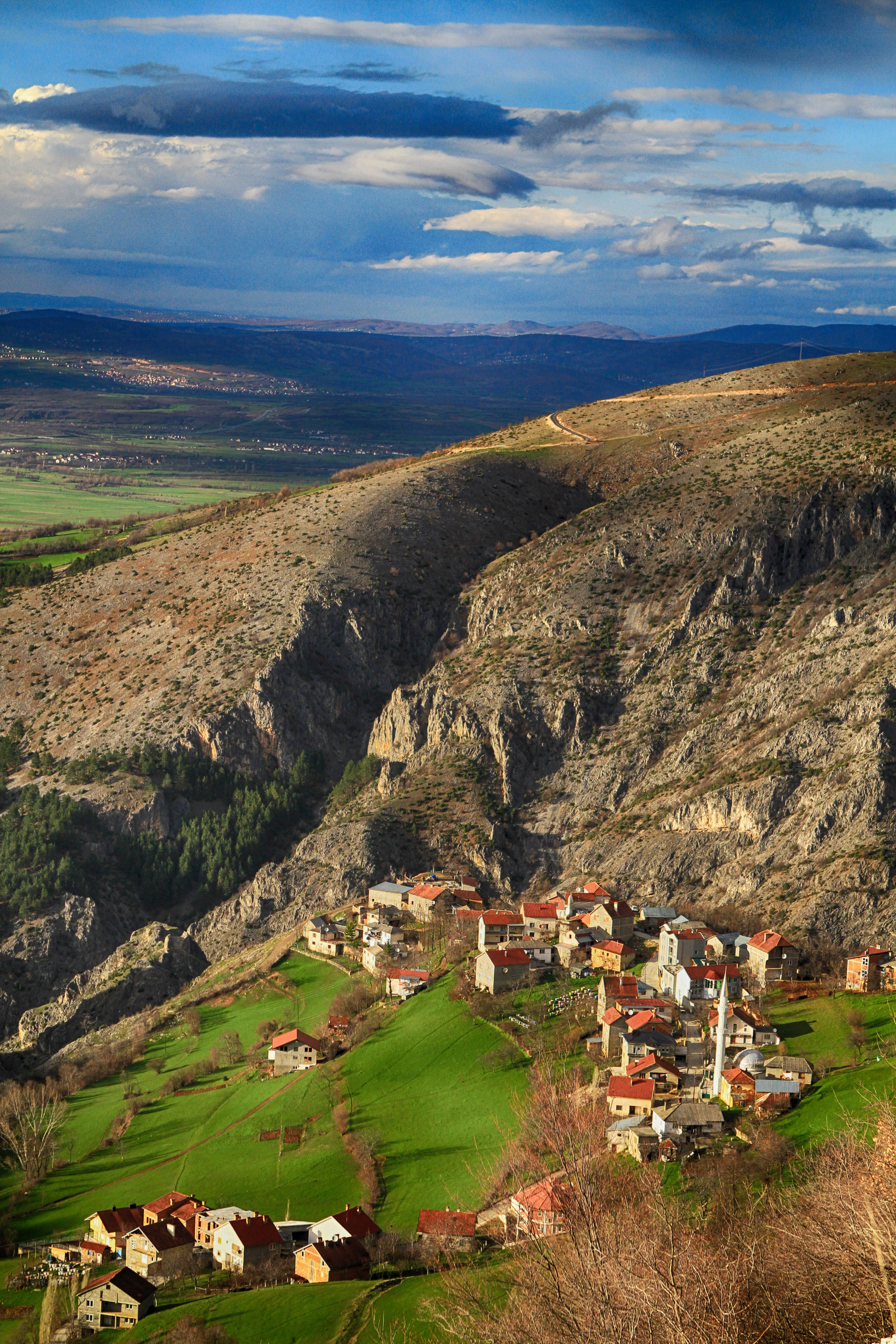
Village near Prizren called Pouskë

The District of Prizren (Albanian: Rajoni i Prizrenit, Serbian: Призренски округ, romanized: Prizrenski okrug, Turkish: Prizren Bölgesi) is one of the seven districts of Kosovo. Its seat is in the city of Prizren. According to the 2011 Census, it has a population of 331,670 and an area of 2,024 square km (around 20% of the total area of Kosovo). Albanians form the majority of the district (85%). However, the district of Prizren is home to the biggest Bosniak and Turkish population in Kosovo, who make around 10% of the district's total population.

== Municipalities ==
The district of Prizren has a total of 5 municipalities and 195 other smaller settlements.

Municipality	Population (2011)	Area (km2)	Density (km2)	Settlements
Prizren	177,781	284	626.0	74
Suva Reka	59,722	306	178.5	42
Malisheva	54,613	361	165.4	43
Dragash	33,997	435	78.2	35
Mamusha	5,507	11	500.6	–
Prizren District	331,670	1,397	237.4	195

=== Settlements ===
==== Prizren Municipality ====
- Atmaxhe
- Bilush
- Caparc
- Dedaj
- Dobrushte
- Dojnice
- Drajciq
- Dushanove
- Gerncar
- Gornjasellë
- Gorozhup
- Grazhdanik
- Gjonaj
- Hoçë e Qytetit
- Jabllanicë
- Jeshkovë
- Kabash
- Kabash i Hasit
- Karashëngjergj
- Kobajë
- Kojushë
- Korishë
- Krajk
- Krushë e Vogël
- Kushnin
- Kushtendil
- Landovicë
- Leskovec
- Lez
- Lubinjë e Epërme
- Lubinjë e Poshtme
- Lubiqevë
- Lubizhde
- Lubizhdë e Hasit
- Lukinaj
- Lutogllave
- Llokvicë
- Malësi e Re
- Manastiricë
- Mazrek
- Medvec
- Milaj
- Muradem
- Mushnikovë
- Nashec
- Nebregoshtë
- Novak
- Novosellë
- Petrovë
- Piranë
- Pllanejë
- Pllanjan
- Poslishtë
- Pouskë
- Prizren
- Randobravë
- Reçan
- Romajë
- Sërbicë e Epërme
- Sërbicë e Poshtme
- Skorobishtë
- Smaç
- Sredskë
- Struzhë
- Shkozë
- Shpenadi
- Trepetnicë
- Tupec
- Velezhë
- Vërbiçan
- Vërmicë
- Vlashnjë
- Zojz
- Zym
- Zhivinjan
- Zhur

==== Suva Reka Municipality ====
- Peqan
- Semetisht
- Mushtisht
- Studençan
- Stravuçinë
- Sopi
- Budakovë
- Bukosh
- Buzhalë
- Krushicë
- Nishor
- Popolan
- Javor
- Duhël
- Grejkoc
- Gjinoc
- Gelacë
- Topliçan
- Tërnje
- Lleshan
- Rreshtan
- Reçan
- Maçitevë
- Nëpërbisht
- Samadraxhë

== Demographics ==
=== Languages ===
Next to the standard provincial Albanian, Serbian and Bosnian, Turkish is also an official language and widely spoken in this district. The municipality of Mamusha is home to around 5,000 Turkish-language speakers.

=== Ethnic groups ===
According to the 2011 census, the largest ethnic groups are Albanians. Other important ethnic groups are Bosniaks, Turks, Gorani, Roma and others.

	Number	%
TOTAL	331,670	100
Albanians	279,909	84.4
Bosniaks	21,027	6.3
Turks	14,425	4.3
Gorani	9,612	2.9
Ashkali and Balkan Egyptians	5,048	1.5
Serbs	246	0.07
Others and no response	1,353	0.4
