= 1999 in film =

The year 1999 in film involved many significant films. The major releases this year included Being John Malkovich, Eyes Wide Shut, Toy Story 2, Magnolia, The Mummy, The Sixth Sense, Tarzan, Fight Club, The Green Mile, The World Is Not Enough, The Matrix, and All About My Mother. American Beauty won the Academy Award for Best Picture this year. There was one film, Star Wars: Episode I – The Phantom Menace, that passed over $1 billion in a re-release of 2012.

Also in 1999, Columbia Pictures and Metro-Goldwyn-Mayer celebrated their 75th anniversaries.

== Highest-grossing films ==
The top 10 films released in 1999 by worldwide gross are as follows:

Highest-grossing films of 1999
Rank	Title	Distributor	Worldwide gross
1	Star Wars: Episode I – The Phantom Menace	20th Century Fox	$924,305,084
2	The Sixth Sense	Buena Vista	$672,806,292
3	Toy Story 2	Buena Vista	$487,059,677
4	The Matrix	Warner Bros.	$465,974,198
5	Tarzan	Buena Vista	$448,191,819
6	The Mummy	Universal	$418,138,535
7	Notting Hill	Universal	$363,889,678
8	The World Is Not Enough	MGM / UIP	$361,832,400
9	American Beauty	DreamWorks	$356,296,601
10	Austin Powers: The Spy Who Shagged Me	New Line	$312,383,487

== Awards ==
Category/Organization	57th Golden Globe Awards January 23, 2000		5th Critics' Choice Awards January 2000	Producers, Directors, Screen Actors, and Writers Guild Awards	72nd Academy Awards March 26, 2000	53rd BAFTA Awards April 9, 2000
Category/Organization	Drama	Musical or Comedy	5th Critics' Choice Awards January 2000	Producers, Directors, Screen Actors, and Writers Guild Awards	72nd Academy Awards March 26, 2000	53rd BAFTA Awards April 9, 2000
Best Film	American Beauty	Toy Story 2	American Beauty			
Best Director	Sam Mendes; American Beauty					Pedro Almodóvar; All About My Mother
Best Actor	Denzel Washington; The Hurricane	Jim Carrey; Man on the Moon	Russell Crowe; The Insider	Kevin Spacey; American Beauty		
Best Actress	Hilary Swank; Boys Don't Cry	Janet McTeer; Tumbleweeds	Hilary Swank; Boys Don't Cry	Annette Bening; American Beauty	Hilary Swank; Boys Don't Cry	Annette Bening; American Beauty
Best Supporting Actor	Tom Cruise; Magnolia		Michael Clarke Duncan; The Green Mile	Michael Caine; The Cider House Rules		Jude Law; The Talented Mr. Ripley
Best Supporting Actress	Angelina Jolie; Girl, Interrupted					Maggie Smith; Tea with Mussolini
Best Screenplay, Adapted	Alan Ball; American Beauty		Frank Darabont; The Green Mile	Alexander Payne and Jim Taylor; Election	John Irving; The Cider House Rules	Neil Jordan; The End of the Affair
Best Screenplay, Original	Alan Ball; American Beauty		Alan Ball; American Beauty			Charlie Kaufman; Being John Malkovich
Best Animated Film	—N/a	—N/a	Toy Story 2	—N/a	—N/a	—N/a
Best Original Score	The Legend of 1900; Ennio Morricone		The Talented Mr. Ripley; Gabriel Yared	N/A	The Red Violin; John Corigliano	American Beauty; Thomas Newman
Best Original Song	"You'll Be in My Heart"; Tarzan		"Music of My Heart"; Music of the Heart	N/A	"You'll Be in My Heart"; Tarzan	N/A
Best Foreign Language Film	All About My Mother			N/A	All About My Mother	

Palme d'Or (52nd Cannes Film Festival):

Rosetta, directed by Jean-Pierre Dardenne and Luc Dardenne, Belgium

Golden Lion (56th Venice International Film Festival):

Not One Less (一個都不能少), directed by Zhang Yimou, China

Golden Bear (49th Berlin International Film Festival):

The Thin Red Line, directed by Terrence Malick, United States

== 1999 films ==
=== By country/region ===
- List of American films of 1999
- List of Argentine films of 1999
- List of Australian films of 1999
- List of Bangladeshi films of 1999
- List of British films of 1999
- List of Canadian films of 1999
- List of French films of 1999
- List of Hong Kong films of 1999
- List of Indian films of 1999
  - List of Hindi films of 1999
  - List of Kannada films of 1999
  - List of Malayalam films of 1999
  - List of Marathi films of 1999
  - List of Tamil films of 1999
  - List of Telugu films of 1999
- List of Japanese films of 1999
- List of Mexican films of 1999
- List of Pakistani films of 1999
- List of Russian films of 1999
- List of South Korean films of 1999
- List of Spanish films of 1999

=== By genre/medium ===
- List of action films of 1999
- List of animated feature films of 1999
- List of avant-garde films of 1999
- List of crime films of 1999
- List of comedy films of 1999
- List of drama films of 1999
- List of horror films of 1999
- List of science fiction films of 1999
- List of thriller films of 1999
- List of western films of 1999

== Births ==
- January 1 – Diamond White, American actress
- January 4 – Gage Munroe, Canadian actor
- January 6 – Eliza Scanlen, Australian actress
- January 15 – Miray Daner, Turkish actress
- January 18 – Karan Brar, American actor
- January 29 – Madison Bailey, American actress
- February 3 – Kanna Hashimoto, Japanese actress
- February 7 – Bea Miller, American singer, songwriter and actress
- February 10 – Tiffany Espensen, American actress
- February 19 – Sonia Ben Ammar, French model, singer and actress
- March 5 – Yeri, South Korean singer and actress
- March 10 – Bruna Griphao, Brazilian actress
- March 25
  - Jin Ji-hee, South Korean actress
  - Mikey Madison, American actress
- April 2 – Audrey Nuna, American singer and rapper
- April 9 - Anamaria Vartolomei, French-Romanian actress
- April 27 – Brooklynn Proulx, Canadian former actress
- April 29 – Morgan Turner, American actress
- May 10 – Michael Gandolfini, American actor
- May 11 – Sabrina Carpenter, American singer and actress
- May 24 – Charlie Plummer, American actor
- May 25 – Brec Bassinger, American actress
- May 27 – Lily-Rose Depp, French-American actress
- May 28 – Cameron Boyce, American actor (d. 2019)
- May 30 – Sean Giambrone, American actor
- June 2 – Madison Leisle, American actress
- June 20 – Kayla Maisonet, American actress
- June 26 – Harley Quinn Smith, American actress
- June 27 – Chandler Riggs, American actor
- July 9 – Claire Corlett, Canadian actress
- July 18 – Onni Tommila, Finnish actor
- July 30 – Joey King, American actress
- August 13 – Eli Brown, American actor
- August 14 - Alison Thornton, Canadian actress
- August 19 – Tristan Lake Leabu, American actor and musician
- August 22
  - Dakota Goyo, Canadian actor
  - Ricardo Hurtado, American actor and singer
- September 1 – Jadagrace, American actress, dancer, singer and rapper
- September 2 – Gavin Casalegno, American actor and model
- September 4 – Ellie Darcey-Alden, English actress
- September 7 – Michelle Creber, Canadian actress
- September 14 – Emma Kenney, American actress
- September 17 – Daniel Huttlestone, English actor
- September 22 - Curry Barker, American filmmaker, actor, comedian and YouTuber
- October 12 – Ferdia Walsh-Peelo, Irish actor and musician
- October 13 – Nell Tiger Free, English actress and singer
- October 15 – Bailee Madison, American actress
- October 21 – Carson MacCormac, Canadian actor
- October 22 – Charlie Wright (American actor), American actor
- October 31 – Danielle Rose Russell, American actress
- November 10
  - Kiernan Shipka, American actress
  - Michael Cimino, American actor
- November 14 – Jude Wright, English actor
- November 16 – Francesca Scorsese, American actress and filmmaker
- December 2 – Fred Hechinger, American actor
- December 7 – Bethany Whitmore, Australian actress

== Deaths ==
Month	Date	Name	Age	Country	Profession	Notable films
January	4	Iron Eyes Cody	91	US	Actor	Ernest Goes to Camp; A Man Called Horse
January	9	Harvey Miller	63	US	Screenwriter, Director, Actor	Private Benjamin; Bad Medicine
January	11	Robert Douglas	89	UK	Actor, Director	The Fountainhead; Ivanhoe
January	12	Betty Lou Gerson	84	US	Actress	One Hundred and One Dalmatians; Cats Don't Dance
January	13	Buzz Kulik	79	US	Director	Riot; To Find a Man
January	14	Fred Myrow	59	US	Composer	Soylent Green; Phantasm
January	15	John Bloom	54	US	Actor	Star Trek VI: The Undiscovered Country; The Great Outdoors
January	15	Betty Box	83	UK	Producer	Doctor in the House; Deadlier Than the Male
January	19	Michael White	36	UK	Production Designer	Armageddon; The Rock
January	21	Leslie French	94	UK	Actor	The Living Daylights; Orders to Kill
January	21	Susan Strasberg	60	US	Actress	Picnic; The Manitou
January	23	Joe D'Amato	62	Italy	Director, Producer	Troll 2; Ator l'invincibile
January	30	Huntz Hall	78	US	Actor	Angels with Dirty Faces; Ghost Chasers
January	30	Ed Herlihy	89	US	Actor	Pee-wee's Big Adventure; The King of Comedy
February	6	Danny Dayton	75	US	Actor	Guys and Dolls; Ed Wood
February	7	William Ludwig	86	US	Screenwriter	Oklahoma!; Interrupted Melody
February	7	Bobby Troup	80	US	Actor, Singer	M*A*S*H; The Five Pennies
February	9	Mary LaRoche	78	US	Actress	Run Silent, Run Deep; Bye Bye Birdie
February	9	Bryan Mosley	67	UK	Actor	Get Carter; Rattle of a Simple Man
February	10	Yuri Borienko	66	Russia	Actor	On Her Majesty's Secret Service; Superman IV: The Quest for Peace
February	17	Sunshine Parker	71	US	Actor	Tremors; Road House
February	17	Shirley Stoler	69	US	Actress	The Deer Hunter; Malcolm X
February	20	Gene Siskel	53	US	Film Critic	None; critiqued films for the Chicago Tribune
February	24	Derek Nimmo	68	UK	Actor	A Hard's Day Night; Casino Royale
February	26	Madelon Baker	88	US	Actress	Girls of the Road; Gasoline Alley
March	3	Lee Philips	72	US	Actor, Director	Peyton Place; Middle of the Night
March	4	Del Close	64	US	Actor	Ferris Bueller's Day Off; The Untouchables
March	4	Eddie Dean	91	US	Singer, Actor	Song of Old Wyoming; Stars Over Texas
March	5	Richard Kiley	76	US	Actor	Blackboard Jungle; The Little Prince
March	6	Graham Armitage	62	UK	Actor	The Devils; The Boy Friend
March	7	Stanley Kubrick	70	US	Director, Screenwriter	2001: A Space Odyssey; Barry Lyndon
March	8	Peggy Cass	74	US	Actress	Auntie Mame; If It's Tuesday, This Must Be Belgium
March	13	Garson Kanin	86	US	Screenwriter, Director	Adam's Rib; Pat and Mike
March	14	Kirk Alyn	88	US	Actor	Superman; When Worlds Collide
March	17	Ernest Gold	77	Austria	Composer	It's a Mad, Mad, Mad, Mad World; Judgment at Nuremberg
March	20	Mickey S. Michaels	67	US	Set Decorator	The Hunt for Red October; Clear and Present Danger
March	22	David Strickland	29	US	Actor	Forces of Nature; Object of Obsession
March	28	Gil Perkins	91	Australia	Actor	Batman; Walking Tall
April	4	Faith Domergue	74	US	Actress	This Island Earth; Vendetta
April	4	Bob Peck	53	UK	Actor	Jurassic Park; Lord of the Flies
April	9	Albert Popwell	72	US	Actor	Sudden Impact; The Enforcer
April	13	Don McGuire	80	US	Screenwriter, Director, Actor	Tootsie; The Delicate Delinquent
April	14	Roy Chiao	72	China	Actor	Indiana Jones and the Temple of Doom; Bloodsport
April	14	Ellen Corby	87	US	Actress	Vertigo; Shane
April	14	Anthony Newley	67	UK	Actor, Composer	Willy Wonka & the Chocolate Factory; Doctor Dolittle
April	15	Yasmeen Khan	c. 48	Pakistan	Actress	Yousuf Khan Sher Bano
April	16	Rudi Fehr	87	Germany	Film Editor	Dial M for Murder; Prizzi's Honor
April	16	Zoë Lund	37	US	Actress	Bad Lieutenant; Special Effects
April	21	Doreen Lang	84	New Zealand	Actress	The Wrong Man; The Birds
April	21	Buddy Rogers	94	US	Actor	Fascinating Youth; Wings
April	22	Bert Remsen	74	US	Actor	The Bodyguard; Nashville
April	28	Rory Calhoun	76	US	Actor	How to Marry a Millionaire; River of No Return
April	28	John Stears	64	UK	Special Effects Artist	Star Wars; Goldfinger
April	28	Donald E. Stewart	69	US	Screenwriter	Missing; The Hunt for Red October
May	2	Augie Blunt	69	US	Actor	Ghost; Life
May	2	Oliver Reed	62	UK	Actor	Oliver!; Gladiator
May	8	Dirk Bogarde	78	UK	Actor	Darling; Death in Venice
May	8	Ed Gilbert	67	US	Voice Actor	The Little Mermaid; Batman: Mask of the Phantasm
May	8	Sally Payne	86	US	Actress	I Love You Again; City for Conquest
May	8	Dana Plato	34	US	Actress	California Suite; Exorcist II: The Heretic
May	14	Jerry Wunderlich	73	US	Set Decorator	The Exorcist; WarGames
May	17	Henry Jones	86	US	Actor	Vertigo; 3:10 to Yuma
May	19	Candy Candido	85	US	Actor	Sadie McKee; The Wizard of Oz
May	19	John McSweeney Jr.	83	US	Film Editor	Mutiny on the Bounty; Million Dollar Mermaid
May	19	Alister Williamson	80	Australia	Actor	Battle of Britain; The Abominable Dr. Phibes
May	21	Vanessa Brown	71	Austria	Actress	The Heiress; The Ghost and Mrs. Muir
May	21	Norman Rossington	70	UK	Actor	A Hard Day's Night; The Longest Day
May	25	Hillary Brooke	84	US	Actress	The Man Who Knew Too Much; The Enchanted Cottage
June	5	Mel Torme	73	US	Singer, Actor	Good News; The Big Operator
June	9	Andrew L. Stone	96	US	Director, Screenwriter	Julie; Cry Terror!
June	11	DeForest Kelley	79	US	Actor	Star Trek; Gunfight at the O.K. Corral
June	13	Douglas Seale	85	UK	Actor	Aladdin; Amadeus
June	18	Aimée Delamain	93	UK	Actress	One of Our Dinosaurs Is Missing; Santa Claus: The Movie
June	19	Mario Soldati	92	Italy	Director	The River Girl; The Great Appeal
June	24	Dorothy Lee	88	US	Actress	Too Many Cooks; Laugh and Get Rich
June	25	Frank Tarloff	83	US	Screenwriter	Father Goose; A Guide for the Married Man
June	27	Bobs Watson	68	US	Actor	Boys Town; What Ever Happened to Baby Jane?
June	28	John Woolf	86	UK	Producer	Oliver!; The Day of the Jackal
June	29	Allan Carr	62	US	Producer	Grease; Can't Stop the Music
June	29	Declan Mulholland	66	Ireland	Actor	Time Bandits; Theatre of Blood
June	30	Dean Fredericks	75	US	Actor	The Phantom Planet; Savage Sam
July	1	Edward Dmytryk	90	Canada	Director, Film Editor	The Caine Mutiny; The Young Lions
July	1	Sylvia Sidney	88	US	Actress	Sabotage; Mars Attacks!
July	2	Mario Puzo	78	US	Screenwriter	The Godfather; Superman
July	4	Ronny Graham	79	US	Screenwriter, Actor	Spaceballs; To Be or Not to Be
July	4	Jack Watson	84	UK	Actor	Peeping Tom; The Hill
July	12	Bill Owen	85	UK	Actor	Georgy Girl; O Lucky Man!
July	17	Donal McCann	58	Ireland	Actor	The Dead; Stealing Beauty
July	17	Patricia Zipprodt	74	US	Costume Designer	The Graduate; 1776
July	19	Yoko Tani	70	France	Actress	The Savage Innocents; My Geisha
July	19	Jerold Wells	90	UK	Actor	Time Bandits; Jabberwocky
July	20	Sandra Gould	82	US	Actress	Airport; Imitation of Life
August	4	Victor Mature	86	US	Actor	Kiss of Death; My Darling Clementine
August	4	Carl Toms	72	UK	Costume Designer	One Million Years B.C.; The Quiller Memorandum
August	7	Brion James	54	US	Actor	Blade Runner; The Fifth Element
August	7	Kazuo Miyagawa	91	Japan	Cinematographer	Yojimbo; Rashomon
August	9	Georg Marischka	77	Austria	Actor, Director, Screenwriter	The Boys from Brazil; The Odessa File
August	12	Ross Elliott	82	US	Actor	Tarantula; The Beast from 20,000 Fathoms
August	16	David Allen	54	US	Visual Effects Artist	Young Sherlock Holmes; Honey, I Shrunk the Kids
August	16	Nancy Guild	73	US	Actress	Somewhere in the Night; Abbott and Costello Meet the Invisible Man
August	23	Norman Wexler	73	US	Screenwriter	Saturday Night Fever; Serpico
August	27	Harold Jack Bloom	75	US	Screenwriter	The Naked Spur; A Gunfight
August	31	Marguerite Chapman	81	US	Actress	The Seven Year Itch; The Amazing Transparent Man
September	9	Chili Bouchier	89	UK	Actress	To Be a Lady; The King's Cup
September	9	Ruth Roman	76	US	Actress	Strangers on a Train; The Far Country
September	12	Harry Crane	85	US	Screenwriter	The Harvey Girls; Air Raid Wardens
September	14	Charles Crichton	89	UK	Director, Film Editor	A Fish Called Wanda; The Third Secret
September	17	Riccardo Cucciolla	75	Italy	Actor	Sacco e Vanzetti; Attack and Retreat
September	17	Joan Gardner	84	UK	Actress	Dark Journey; The Scarlet Pimpernel
September	17	Frankie Vaughan	71	UK	Singer, Actor	Let's Make Love; The Right Approach
September	18	Harold F. Kress	86	US	Film Editor	The Towering Inferno; The Poseidon Adventure
September	22	George C. Scott	71	US	Actor	Patton; Dr. Strangelove
September	23	Ivan Goff	89	Australia	Screenwriter	White Heat; Midnight Lace
September	26	Bernadette O'Farrell	75	Ireland	Actress	The Bridal Path; The Square Ring
October	1	Noel Johnson	82	UK	Actor	Frightmare; For Your Eyes Only
October	2	Lee Richardson	73	US	Actor	Prizzi's Honor; Prince of the City
October	5	Wilt Chamberlain	63	US	Actor	Conan the Destroyer; Any Given Sunday
October	6	Maris Wrixon	82	US	Actress	The Ape; Waterfront
October	7	Deryck Guyler	85	UK	Actor	A Hard Day's Night; Carry On Doctor
October	7	Helen Vinson	92	US	Actress	In Name Only; I Am a Fugitive from a Chain Gang
October	12	Jacqueline Malouf	58	US	Actress	The Man Who Shot Liberty Valance; Donovan's Reef
October	14	Richard B. Shull	70	US	Actor	Klute; Splash
October	16	Jean Shepherd	78	US	Actor	A Christmas Story; It Runs in the Family
October	19	Paddi Edwards	67	UK	Actress	The Little Mermaid; Hercules
October	26	Hoyt Axton	61	US	Singer, Actor	Gremlins; The Black Stallion
October	26	Abraham Polonsky	88	US	Screenwriter, Director	Body and Soul; Force of Evil
October	26	Albert Whitlock	84	UK	Visual Effects Artist	The Thing; Earthquake
October	27	Lois Collier	80	US	Actress	A Night in Casablanca; Jungle Woman
October	27	Frank De Vol	88	US	Composer	The Dirty Dozen; What Ever Happened to Baby Jane?
October	29	Cavan Kendall	57	UK	Actor	Sexy Beast; Eureka
October	30	Grace McDonald	81	US	Actress	Follow the Boys; It Ain't Hay
November	3	Ian Bannen	71	UK	Actor	Braveheart; Gandhi
November	4	David Shaber	70	US	Screenwriter	The Warriors; Nighthawks
November	5	James Goldstone	68	US	Director	Rollercoaster; When Time Ran Out
November	9	Mabel King	66	US	Actress	The Wiz; Scrooged
November	11	Mary Kay Bergman	38	US	Voice Actress	South Park: Bigger, Longer & Uncut; Beauty and the Beast
November	14	Lucile Fairbanks	82	US	Actress	Passage from Hong Kong; A Fugitive from Justice
November	20	Adele Balkan	92	US	Costume Designer	The Fly; Mighty Joe Young
November	21	Ralph Foody	71	US	Actor	Home Alone; The Blues Brothers
November	24	Hilary Minster	55	UK	Actor	A Bridge Too Far; Cry Freedom
November	25	William 'Billy' Benedict	82	US	Actor	The Sting; The Killing
November	27	Robert F. Shugrue	62	US	Film Editor	Two Mules for Sister Sara; Star Trek III: The Search for Spock
November	28	Bethel Leslie	70	US	Actress	Message in a Bottle; Ironweed
December	3	John Archer	84	US	Actor	White Heat; Blue Hawaii
December	3	Madeline Kahn	57	US	Actress	Blazing Saddles; Young Frankenstein
December	5	Masaru Sato	71	Japan	Composer	Yojimbo; The Hidden Fortress
December	12	Joseph Heller	76	US	Screenwriter	Sex and the Single Girl; Dirty Dingus Magee
December	13	Daniel M. Angel	88	UK	Producer	Reach for the Sky; Carve Her Name with Pride
December	14	Ernest Walter	80	UK	Film Editor	The Haunting; The Private Life of Sherlock Holmes
December	17	Rex Allen	78	US	Actor, Singer	Hills of Oklahoma; The Incredible Journey
December	18	Robert Bresson	98	France	Director	A Man Escaped; L'Argent
December	19	Desmond Llewelyn	85	UK	Actor	James Bond; Chitty Chitty Bang Bang
December	20	Irving Rapper	101	US	Director	One Foot in Heaven; The Brave One
December	21	John Arnatt	82	UK	Actor	Whistle Down the Wind; Our Mother's House
December	21	Bill Edwards	81	US	Actor	Our Hearts Were Young and Gay; Hail the Conquering Hero
December	21	Bernard Smith	92	US	Producer	How the West Was Won; Elmer Gantry
December	21	Frank Stanley	77	US	Cinematographer	Magnum Force; 10
December	23	Lois Hamilton	56	US	Actress	Stripes; The Cannonball Run
December	25	Peter Jeffrey	70	UK	Actor	Midnight Express; The Adventures of Baron Munchausen
December	26	Pierre Clémenti	57	France	Actor	The Leopard; Pigsty
December	26	Curtis Mayfield	57	US	Singer, Composer	Super Fly; Claudine
December	26	Michael McDowell	49	US	Screenwriter	Beetlejuice; The Nightmare Before Christmas
December	26	Dick Peabody	74	US	Actor	Support Your Local Sheriff!; Mackenna's Gold
December	29	Clayton Moore	85	US	Actor	The Lone Ranger; Black Dragons
December	29	Harry Monty	95	US	Actor, Stuntman	Planet of the Apes; Papillon

== Film debuts ==
- Amy Adams − Drop Dead Gorgeous
- Roberto Álamo − The Ugliest Woman in the World
- Anthony Anderson − Life
- Katie Boland − Striking Poses
- Jay Baruchel − Running Home
- Adam Brody − Random Acts of Violence
- Daniel Brühl − Paradise Mall
- Celso Bugallo − Butterfly's Tongue
- Mariah Carey – The Bachelor
- Paddy Considine – A Room for Romeo Brass
- Émilie Dequenne − Rosetta
- Zooey Deschanel − Mumford
- Garret Dillahunt − Last Call
- Omid Djalili − The Mummy
- Ryan Donowho – Varsity Blues
- Rachel Dratch − Serious Business
- Kevin Durand – Austin Powers: The Spy Who Shagged Me
- Danny Dyer – Human Traffic
- Idris Elba − Belle maman
- Juan Fernández − Alone
- James Franco − Never Been Kissed
- Zach Galifianakis − Flushed
- Kathryn Hahn – Flushed
- Tony Hale − Raging Hormones
- Regina Hall − The Best Man
- Cory Hardrict – Never Been Kissed
- Andrew Howard – Shades
- Hugh Jackman − Paperback Hero
- Dakota Johnson − Crazy in Alabama
- Michael B. Jordan − Black and White
- Shakib Khan − Ananta Bhalobasha
- Chris Klein − Election
- Ashton Kutcher − Coming Soon
- Brie Larson − Special Delivery
- Ali Larter − Varsity Blues
- Mélanie Laurent − The Bridge
- Joshua Leonard – The Blair Witch Project
- Justin Long − Galaxy Quest
- Carmen Machi – Shacky Carmine
- Taryn Manning − Speedway Junky
- Kate Mara − Random Hearts
- Melissa McCarthy − Go
- Wotan Wilke Möhring – Zoe
- Bobby Moynihan − Nine the Hard Way
- Rubén Ochandiano − Flowers from Another World
- Kip Pardue − But I'm a Cheerleader
- Simon Pegg − Tube Tales
- Kal Penn − Freshman
- Piper Perabo − Whiteboyz
- Alison Pill – The Life Before This
- Alysia Reiner – The Stand-In
- Shawn Roberts – Jacob Two Two Meets the Hooded Fang
- Seann William Scott − American Pie
- Peter Serafinowicz − Star Wars: Episode I – The Phantom Menace
- Alia Shawkat − Three Kings
- Dylan Sprouse – Big Daddy
- Audrey Tautou − Venus Beauty Institute
- Gabrielle Union − She's All That
- Karine Vanasse − Set Me Free
- Paz Vega − Zapping
- Justus von Dohnányi – Jakob the Liar
- Michael Weston – Getting to Know You
- Ben Whishaw – The Trench
- Rainn Wilson – Galaxy Quest
- Yu Nan – Lunar Eclipse
