= Deaths in November 1999 =

The following is a list of notable deaths in November 1999.

Entries for each day are listed alphabetically by surname. A typical entry lists information in the following sequence:

- Name, age, country of citizenship at birth, subsequent country of citizenship (if applicable), reason for notability, cause of death (if known), and reference.

== November 1999 ==
=== 1 ===
- Minoru Chiaki, 82, Japanese actor.
- Jean Coutu, 74, Canadian actor.
- Edmund Dell, 78, British politician and businessman.
- Bhekimpi Dlamini, 74, Southern African politician, Prime Minister of Swaziland (1983–1986).
- Theodore Hall, 74, American physicist and spy for the Soviet Union, renal cancer.
- Thomas H. Jukes, 93, British-American biologist.
- Pat McLaughlin, 89, American baseball player (Detroit Tigers, Philadelphia Athletics).
- Ted Migdal, 85, American basketball player.
- Walter Payton, 46, American Hall of Fame gridiron football player (Chicago Bears), cholangiocarcinoma.
- Héctor Pellegrini, 68, Argentine film actor.
- Franca Scagnetti, 75, Italian film actress.
- John Sears, 63, American NASCAR racing driver.
- William Sheldon, 92, Irish politician and farmer.
- Aubrey Webster, 89, Canadian ice hockey player (Philadelphia Quakers, Montreal Maroons).

=== 2 ===
- Milan Antal, 64, Slovak astronomer.
- Jackie Davis, 78, American soul jazz singer, organist and bandleader, stroke.
- Demetrio B. Lakas, 74, Panamanian politician, president (1969–1978), heart disease.
- Atputharajah Nadarajah, 36, Sri Lankan journalist and politician, shot.
- Billy Nicks, 94, American college football player and coach.
- Hans-Joachim Preil, 76, East German comedian.
- Hardie Scott, 92, American politician, member of the United States House of Representatives (1947-1953).
- Mitar Subotić, 38, Serbian-Brazilian musician and composer, fire.
- William van Straubenzee, 75, British politician.
- Richard Voliva, 87, American wrestler, coach, and Olympian (1936).

=== 3 ===
- Ian Bannen, 71, Scottish actor, car accident.
- Robert C. Belloni, 80, American district judge (United States District Court for the District of Oregon).
- Jack Bionda, 66, Canadian ice hockey and lacrosse player (Toronto Maple Leafs, Boston Bruins).
- William J. Brown, 59, American lawyer and politician.
- Alan Heusaff, 78, Breton nationalist, linguist, and journalist.
- Vilen Kalyuta, 69, Soviet and Ukrainian cinematographer.
- Keizo Saji, 80, Japanese businessman and art patron.

=== 4 ===
- Daisy Bates, 84, American civil rights activist, publisher and journalist.
- Alvin Coox, 75, American military historian and author.
- Zvi Griliches, 69, American economist and holocaust survivor.
- Ernest J. Kump, 87, American architect, author and inventor.
- Malcolm Marshall, 41, West Indian cricketer, colon cancer.
- Giovanni De Martin, 71, Italian Olympic bobsledder (1956).
- Cornel Popa, 64, Romanian football player.
- Maybelle Reichardt, 92, American discus thrower and Olympian (1928).
- David Shaber, 70, American screenwriter (The Warriors, Nighthawks, Flight of the Intruder), aneurysm.
- Henri Van Kerckhove, 73, Belgian road cyclist.
- Wakasugiyama Toyoichi, 66, Japanese sumo wrestler.
- Fred Wallner, 71, American gridiron football player (Chicago Cardinals, Houston Oilers).
- Charles Wintour, 82, British newspaper editor.
- Zainuddin, 47, Indian actor and comedian, respiratory complications.

=== 5 ===
- Antonio Fraguas Fraguas, 93, Spanish historian, ethnographer, anthropologist, and geographer.
- James Goldstone, 68, American film and television director.
- Willie Halpern, 92, American football player.
- Noureddin Kianouri, 94, Iranian architect and political leader.
- Richard Marius, 66, American academic and writer, pancreatic cancer.
- Colin Rowe, 79, British-American architectural historian.

=== 6 ===
- Sleim Ammar, 72, Tunisian neuropsychiatrist and poet.
- José María Caffarel, 79, Spanish film actor.
- Laurence Decore, 59, Canadian lawyer and politician, cancer.
- Regina Ghazaryan, 84, Armenian painter and public figure.
- George V. Higgins, 59, American author, lawyer, newspaper columnist, and raconteur, heart attack.
- Rob Hoeke, 60, Dutch singer, pianist, composer and songwriter.
- Anthony "Sooty" Jones, 46, American rock bassist ("Humble Pie").
- Charles Mason, 91, American Olympic rower (1928).
- Hank Messick, American investigative journalist and author.

=== 7 ===
- Tom Briggs, 80, English football player.
- Allan Felder, 56, American songwriter.
- Joe Lang Kershaw, 88, American politician and civics teacher, congestive heart failure.
- Walter McDonald, 96, Canadian politician.
- Primo Nebiolo, 76, Italian sports official and IAAF president, heart attack.

=== 8 ===
- Lester Bowie, 58, American jazz trumpet player and composer, liver cancer.
- Tom Domres, 53, American football player (Houston Oilers, Denver Broncos).
- Gwen Gordy Fuqua, 71, American songwriter and composer, cancer.
- Jerry Kerr, 87, Scottish football player and manager.
- Coley Logan, 87, American baseball player.
- Yury Vasilyevich Malyshev, 58, Soviet cosmonaut (Soyuz T-2, Soyuz T-11).
- Yvon Mariolle, 53, French boxer and Olympian (1968).
- Richard Martin, 51, American academic, curator, and art and fashion historian, melanoma.
- Rob Nieuwenhuys, 91, Dutch writer.
- Harry Riebauer, 78, German film and television actor.
- Heinz Schmitz, 71, German Olympic field hockey player (1952).
- Leon Štukelj, 100, Yugoslav gymnast and Olympic gold medalist (1924, 1928, 1936), heart attack.
- Jean Verhaert, 91, Belgian Olympic sprinter (1936).

=== 9 ===
- Herb Abramson, 82, American record producer and executive.
- Marjorie Gladman, 91, American tennis player.
- Huang Huoqing, 98, Chinese politician.
- Mabel King, 66, American actress and singer, diabetes.
- Wolf Ruvinskis, 78, Mexican actor and professional wrestler, cardiovascular disease.
- Dick Todd, 85, American NFL football player (Washington Redskins), and coach.

=== 10 ===
- Stasys Antanas Bačkis, 93, Lithuanian diplomat and civil servant.
- Felix Galimir, 89, Austrian-American violinist.
- Robert Kramer, 60, American film director, screenwriter and actor, meningitis.
- Eric Langton, 92, English motorcycle speedway rider.
- José Martins, 68, Brazilian boxer and Olympian (1960).
- Thomas McKinney, 72, Northern Irish rugby player.
- Jean Potts, 88, American mystery novelist.

=== 11 ===
- Mary Kay Bergman, 38, American voice actress (South Park, Scooby-Doo, The New Adventures of Zorro), suicide by gunshot.
- Frank Bowyer, 77, English footballer.
- Maurice Dugowson, 61, French film director and screenwriter.
- Sir Vivian Fuchs, 91, British explorer.
- Gabriel Gonsum Ganaka, 62, Nigerian Roman Catholic prelate.
- Daniel Ivernel, 79, French film actor, suicide.
- Choi Moo-ryong, 71, South Korean actor.
- Sathyavani Muthu, 76, Indian politician.
- Thomas Pitfield, 96, British composer, poet, artist, engraver, and calligrapher.
- Jack Plimsoll, 82, South African cricketer.
- Lodewijk Prins, 86, Dutch chess player and chess referee.
- Jacobo Timerman, 76, Soviet-Argentine publisher, journalist, and author, heart attack.

=== 12 ===
- Eulalie Minfred Banks, 104, American illustrator of children's books.
- Gaby Casadesus, 98, French classical pianist and teacher.
- Pituka de Foronda, 81, Spanish actress.
- Engelbert Haider, 77, Austrian Olympic alpine skier (1948).
- Sven Hjertsson, 75, Swedish football player and Olympian (1952).
- Aang Kunaefi, 76, Indonesian military officer and diplomat.
- Mohammad Mohammadullah, 78, Bangladeshi politician, President (1973–1975).
- Konrad Petzold, 69, German film director, writer and actor.
- Alfred Gwynne Vanderbilt II, 87, British-American racehorse owner and member of the Vanderbilt family.

=== 13 ===
- John Benson Brooks, 82, American jazz pianist, songwriter, arranger, and composer.
- Richard Chopping, 70, Canadian field hockey player and Olympian (1964).
- Germaine Dieterlen, 96, French anthropologist.
- Ray Goolsby, 80, American baseball player (Washington Senators).
- Marianne Gustafsson, 86, Swedish Olympic swimmer (1928).
- Donald Mills, 84, American singer (The Mills Brothers), pneumonia.
- Tony Rumble, 43, American professional wrestler and manager, heart attack.
- John Stapp, 89, United States Army Air Forces officer, flight surgeon and physician.
- Barbara Jean Wong, 75, American actress.

=== 14 ===
- Rut Bryk, 83, Finnish ceramist.
- Orazio Costa, 88, Italian theatre pedagogist and director.
- Brian Ó Cuív, 83, Irish historian and Celtic scholar.
- George Fahoum, 90, Egyptian Olympic sprinter (1936).
- Lucile Fairbanks, 82, American actress.
- Bert Jacobs, 58, Dutch football manager, cancer.
- Minna Keal, 90, British composer.
- Robert Perew, 76, American rower and Olympian (1948).
- Benjamin I. Schwartz, 82, American academic, author and sinologist.
- György Sebők, 77, Hungarian-American pianist and academic.
- Jimmy Sidle, 57, American gridiron football player (Atlanta Falcons), heart failure.
- Harbaksh Singh, 86, Indian Army senior officer.
- Peter Wildeblood, 76, Anglo-Canadian journalist, novelist, playwright and gay rights campaigner.

=== 15 ===
- Jean-Marie Adiaffi, 58, Ivorian writer, screenwriter and filmmaker.
- Sir Harry Llewellyn, 3rd Baronet, 88, British equestrian, Olympic champion (1948, 1952).
- P. K. van der Byl, 76, Rhodesian politician.
- Fikri Elma, 65, Turkish football player.
- Lucien Jasseron, 85, French football player.
- Gene Levitt, 79, American television writer, producer and director, prostate cancer.
- Maynard Lyndon, 92, American architect.
- Norio Taniguchi, 87, Japanese academic who coined the term nano-technology.

=== 16 ===
- Allen Benson, 94, American baseball player (Washington Senators).
- Bill Burgoyne, 52, New Zealand rugby league player.
- Harry Gibbs, 79, British boxing referee.
- H. Clay Earles, 86, American NASCAR team owner.
- Desmond Domnique Jennings, 28, American serial killer, execution by lethal injection.
- Jay Moloney, 35, American Hollywood talent agent, suicide by hanging.
- Daniel Nathans, 71, American microbiologist.
- Henri Padou Jr., 71, French Olympic swimmer (1948).

=== 17 ===
- Leif Anderson, 74, Swedish jazz expert, journalist and radio personality.
- Faubion Bowers, 82, American academic and writer.
- Edmund Fryde, 76, Polish-British historian.
- Cowboy Jimmy Moore, 89, American pocket billiards (pool) player.
- Enrique Urkijo, 39, Spanish singer, songwriter, and guitarist, drug overdose.

=== 18 ===
- Evgeny Belosheikin, 33, Russian ice hockey player, suicide.
- Paul Bowles, 88, American migrant composer, author, and translator, heart failure.
- Beatrice Colen, 51, American actress (Happy Days, Wonder Woman, Lifeguard), lung cancer.
- Sarath Dassanayake, 57, Sri Lankan composer, film producer and a musician.
- Stephen Greene, 82, American artist.
- Jay Heard, 79, American baseball player (Baltimore Orioles).
- Horst P. Horst, 93, German-born American fashion photographer.
- Vittorio Miele, 72, Italian painter.
- Prince Heinrich of Hesse and by Rhine, 72, German noble.
- Doug Sahm, 58, American musician and singer-songwriter, heart attack.
- James Tinn, 77, British politician.
- Gladys Yang, 80, British translator of Chinese literature.

=== 19 ===
- Yvette Cauchois, 90, French physicist, infectious disease.
- Alexander Liberman, 87, Russian-American publisher, painter, photographer, and sculptor.
- Plínio Marcos, 64, Brazilian writer, actor, journalist and playwright, multiple organ dysfunction syndrome.
- John McCue, 77, English footballer.
- Antonis Migiakis, 88, Greek football player and coach.
- Arthur W. Saha, 76, American speculative fiction editor and anthologist, cancer.

=== 20 ===
- Yuri Chesnokov, 47, Soviet football player.
- Amintore Fanfani, 91, Italian politician and statesman, prime minister (1954, 1958-1959, 1960-1963, 1982-1983, 1987).
- Ludwig Hamm, 77, German politician and member of the Bundestag.
- Sadao Hasegawa, 54, Japanese graphic artist, suicide by hanging.
- Arthur Hewson, 84, Australian politician.
- Sufia Kamal, 88, Bangladeshi poet and political activist.
- Germaine Ribière, 82, French Resistance member during World War II.
- Fred Thurier, 83, Canadian ice hockey player (New York/Brooklyn Americans, New York Rangers).

=== 21 ===
- Alphonse Antoine, 84, French road bicycle racer.
- Margaret E. Chisholm, 78, American librarian and educator.
- Quentin Crisp, 90, British writer (The Naked Civil Servant), illustrator, actor and socialite, heart attack.
- Ralph Foody, 71, American actor (Home Alone), cancer.
- Marie Kraja, 88, Albanian opera singer.
- Serge Lang, 79, French journalist and skiing executive, heart attack.
- Josef Lux, 43, Czech politician, pneumonia.
- Horacio Gómez Bolaños prieto, 69, Mexican actor and brother of Chespirito, heart attack.
- Toshio Sakai, 59, Japanese news photographer and Pulitzer Prize winner, heart attack.

=== 22 ===
- Ibrahim Böhme, 55, East German politician and Stasi informer.
- Roy Cole, 87, Canadian Olympic sports shooter (1952).
- Flávio Costa, 93, Brazilian football player and manager.
- Moira Dunbar, 81, Scottish-Canadian glaciologist.
- Efim Etkind, 81, Soviet philologist and translation theorist.
- Charley Griffith, 70, American racing driver.
- Abdelkader Hachani, 42, Algerian Islamic leader, murdered.
- Patrick Moten, 42, American songwriter and musician, cancer.

=== 23 ===
- Oddmund Andersen, 83, Norwegian football player.
- Leyla Badirbeyli, 79, Soviet and Azerbaijani actress.
- Micheál Cranitch, 86, Irish Fianna Fáil politician.
- Pat Lundy, 75, Canadian ice hockey player (Detroit Red Wings, Chicago Black Hawks).
- Baldur Möller, 85, Icelandic chess master.
- Patrick Palmer, 66, British Army officer.
- Phoebe Snetsinger, 68, American birder, road traffic accident.

=== 24 ===
- Howard Biggs, 83, American pianist, songwriter and arranger.
- Joseph Farrell, 94, Irish Fianna Fáil politician.
- Fernando Fernández, 83, Mexican actor, singer and director.
- Sarah Gainham, 84, British novelist and journalist.
- Gregor Höll, 88, Austrian skier and Olympian (1932, 1948).
- David Kessler, 93, British publisher and author.
- Mario Mathieu, 82, Argentine Olympic cyclist (1948).
- Matéo Maximoff, 82, French writer and evangelical pastor.
- Hilary Minster, 55, English character actor, cancer.
- Alfred Noble, 75, English footballer and Olympian (1952).
- Christian Pedersen, 79, Danish Olympic cyclist (1948).
- Ambrose Rayappan, 98, Indian Roman Catholic archbishop.
- Howie Young, 62, Canadian ice hockey player and actor.

=== 25 ===
- Didier Anzieu, 76, French psychoanalyst and academic.
- William Benedict, 82, American actor.
- Oddvar Berrefjord, 81, Norwegian jurist and politician.
- Pierre Bézier, 89, French engineer, CAD/CAM pioneer and namesake of Bézier curves.
- Valentín Campa, 95, Mexican railway union leader and politician.
- Richard M. Eakin, 89, American zoologist and professor.
- T. V. Kochubava, 43, Indian writer, heart attack.
- Lucile Petry Leone, 97, American nurse.
- Dumisani Maraire, 54, Zimbabwean musician, stroke.
- Antonio Raxel, 77, Mexican actor.
- Jesse Renick, 82, American basketball player and Olympian (1948).
- Twila Shively, 79, American baseball player.
- Ray Timgren, 71, Canadian ice hockey player (Toronto Maple Leafs, Chicago Black Hawks).
- Gordon Wren, 80, American Olympic skier (1948).

=== 26 ===
- Louisette Bertholle, 94, French cooking teacher and writer.
- Boris Butenko, 76, Soviet Ukrainian Olympic discus thrower (1952).
- George L. Engel, 85, American internist and psychiatrist, heart failure.
- Angelika Hurwicz, 77, German actress and theatre director.
- Clifford Jarvis, 58, American hard bop and free jazz drummer.
- John L. Kelley, 82, American mathematician.
- Paul Kozlicek, 62, Austrian football player.
- Ashley Montagu, 94, British-American anthropologist.
- Henry Nemo, 90, American musician, songwriter, and actor.
- John Skelton, 76, British letter-cutter and sculptor.

=== 27 ===
- Jeanne Chall, 78, American psychologist, writer, and educator, heart failure.
- Rod Franz, 74, American college football player (California Golden Bears).
- William Sebastian Heckscher, 94, German art historian and academic.
- I-Roy, 55, Jamaican DJ, heart failure.
- John Karrs, 84, American football player (Cleveland Rams).
- Hiro Matsuda, 62, Japanese-American professional wrestler and trainer, prostate cancer.
- Arturo Fernández Meyzán, 93, Peruvian footballer and Olympian (1936).
- Oleg Nikolayev, 31, Russian Olympic boxer (1992).
- Alain Peyrefitte, 74, French scholar and politician, cancer.
- Robert Theobald, 70, American economist and futurist author, esophageal cancer.
- Elizabeth Gray Vining, 97, American librarian, tutor and author.
- Johnny Walker, 72, American blues pianist and organist.

=== 28 ===
- Robert Bingham, 33, American writer, drugs overdose.
- Dick Errickson, 87, American baseball player (Boston Bees/Braves, Chicago Cubs).
- N. V. M. Gonzalez, 84, Filipino novelist, short story writer, essayist and poet.
- Peter Karvaš, 79, Slovak writer.
- Bethel Leslie, 70, American actress and screenwriter, cancer.
- Abdur Razzaq, Bangladeshi scholar, academic and intellectual.

=== 29 ===
- Germán Arciniegas, 98, Colombian historian, author and journalist, pneumonia.
- John Berry, 82, American film director.
- Suzy Carrier, 77, French film actress.
- Herbert Freudenberger, 73, German-American psychologist, kidney disease.
- Tom Herrin, 70, American baseball player (Boston Red Sox).
- Kaoru Iwamoto, 97, Japanese Go player and writer.
- Bill Jennings, 82, Canadian ice hockey player (Detroit Red Wings, Boston Bruins).
- Curtis Knight, 70, American musician, cancer.
- Michael O'Halloran, 66, Irish-born British politician.
- Sid Patterson, 72, Australian track cyclist and Olympian (1948), liver cancer.
- Gene Rayburn, 81, American radio personality and game show host, heart failure.
- Kazuo Sakamaki, 81, Japanese naval officer.
- Lewis Hastings Sarett, 81, American organic chemist and inventor of cortisone.

=== 30 ===
- Carlos Hugo Christensen, 84, Argentine film director, screenwriter and film producer.
- Philip Elman, 81, American lawyer at the U.S. Department of Justice.
- Don Harris, 61, American blues and rock and roll violinist and guitarist, pulmonary disease.
- Huang Hsin-chieh, 71, Taiwanese politician and legislator, heart attack.
- Al Schroll, 67, American baseball player.
- Juliusz Sieradzki, 87, Polish Olympic sailor (1936).
- M. N. Srinivas, 83, Indian sociologist and social anthropologist.
- Sam Treiman, 74, American theoretical physicist, leukemia.
- Ulrich Wildgruber, 62, German actor.
- Vladimir Yashchenko, 40, Soviet high jumper and world record holder, cirrhosis.
