= Lottie Williams (actress, born 1874) =

American actress (1874–1962)

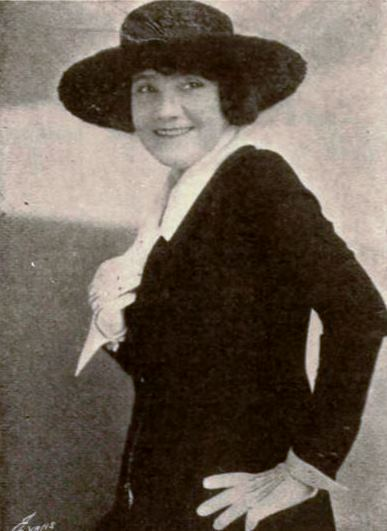
- Williams in 1920
- Born: January 20, 1874; Indianapolis, Indiana, United States
- Died: November 16, 1962 (aged 88); Los Angeles, California, United States
- Occupation: Actress
- Years active: 1920–1949

Lottie Williams (January 20, 1874 – November 16, 1962) was an American character actress whose career spanned both the silent and sound film eras.

== Early life ==
Lottie Williams was born on January 20, 1874, in Indianapolis, Indiana.

== Career ==
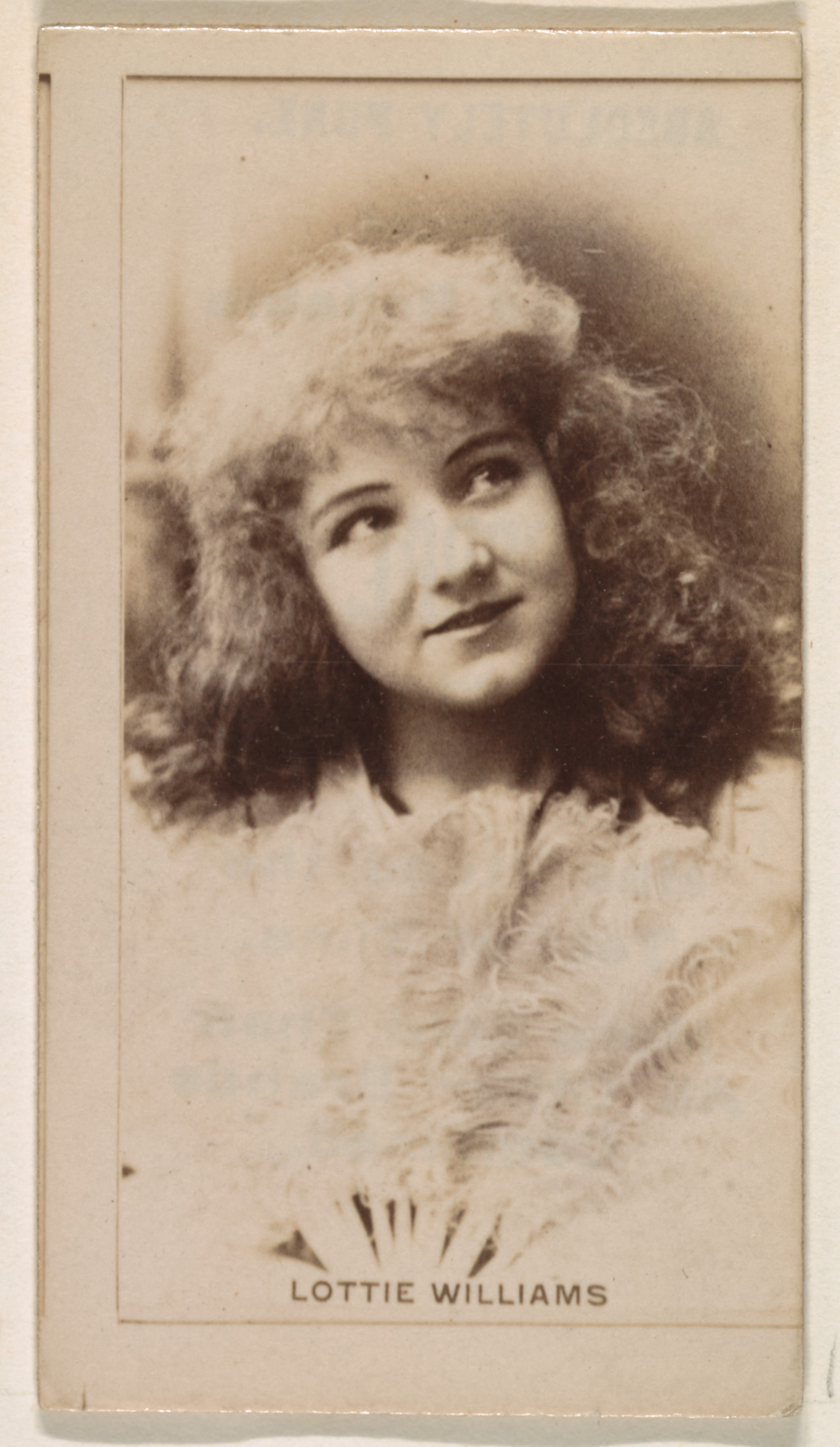
Lottie Williams in 1890

Williams debuted on film in a supporting role in the 1920 silent comedy A Full House. She appeared in over 70 films, mostly in smaller and supporting roles, during her 30-year career.

Williams in the film The Great O'Malley (1937)

Some of the more notable films in which she appeared include: Michael Curtiz' Angels with Dirty Faces (1938), starring James Cagney and Pat O'Brien; the 1939 melodrama Dark Victory, with Bette Davis, Humphrey Bogart and George Brent; Meet John Doe (1941), directed by Frank Capra, and starring Gary Cooper and Barbara Stanwyck; the screwball comedy, The Man Who Came to Dinner (1942), starring Bette Davis, Ann Sheridan, and Monty Woolley; and Edge of Darkness (1942), starring Errol Flynn and Ann Sheridan; Her final appearance would be in a supporting role in 1949's One Last Fling, starring Alexis Smith and Zachary Scott, after which she retired from the film industry.

== Death ==
Williams died on November 16, 1962, in Los Angeles, California.

== Filmography ==
(Per AFI database)

- A Full House (1920)
- Twin Beds (1920)
- All Soul's Eve (1921)
- Is Matrimony a Failure? (1922)
- The Veiled Woman (1922)
- The Barefoot Boy (1923)
- Yesterday's Wife (1923)
- The Tomboy (1924)
- The Country Beyond (1926)
- Arizona Nights (1927)
- Strictly Modern (1930)
- Wonder Bar (1934)
- 6 Day Bike Rider (1934)
- Elinor Norton (1934)
- Registered Nurse (1934)
- Anthony Adverse (1936)
- The Case of the Black Cat (1936)
- I Married a Doctor (1936)
- Murder by an Aristocrat (1936)
- The Story of Louis Pasteur (1936)
- Wine, Women and Horses (1937)
- That Man's Here Again (1937)
- The Cherokee Strip (1937)
- Submarine D-1 (1937)
- The Great O'Malley (1937)
- Empty Holsters (1937)
- The Beloved Brat (1938)
- Angels with Dirty Faces (1938)
- The Sisters (1938)
- Nancy Drew... Detective (1938)
- Love, Honor and Behave (1938)
- Little Miss Thoroughbred (1938)
- Penrod and His Twin Brother (1938)
- The Roaring Twenties (1939, uncredited)
- King of the Underworld (1939, uncredited)
- Dark Victory (1939) as Lucy
- On Trial (1939)
- No Place to Go (1939)
- Off the Record (1939)
- Blackwell's Island (1939)
- Espionage Agent (1939)
- Four Wives (1939)
- Yes, My Darling Daughter (1939)
- Private Detective (1939)
- Money and the Woman (1940)
- Dancing on a Dime (1940)
- A Fugitive from Justice (1940)
- Ladies Must Live (1940)
- Calling All Husbands (1940)
- Always a Bride (1940)
- The Man Who Talked Too Much (1940)
- An Angel from Texas (1940)
- The Great Mr. Nobody (1941)
- The Nurse's Secret (1941)
- Passage from Hong Kong (1941)
- One Foot in Heaven (1941)
- Meet John Doe (1941)
- The Man Who Came to Dinner (1942) Fan at train station (uncredited)
- All Through the Night (1942)
- Busses Roar (1942)
- Edge of Darkness (1943)
- The Gorilla Man (1943)
- Mr. Skeffington (1944)
- Hotel Berlin (1945)
- One More Tomorrow (1946)
- Shadow of a Woman (1946)
- Two Guys from Milwaukee (1946)
- Nora Prentiss (1947)
- The Big Punch (1948)
- June Bride (1948)
- To the Victor (1948)
- A Kiss in the Dark (1949)
- One Last Fling (1949)
