= Deaths in June 1999 =

The following is a list of notable deaths in June 1999.

Entries for each day are listed alphabetically by surname. A typical entry lists information in the following sequence:

- Name, age, country of citizenship at birth, subsequent country of citizenship (if applicable), reason for notability, cause of death (if known), and reference.

== June 1999 ==
=== 1 ===
- Lloyd L. Burke, 74, United States Army soldier and recipient of the Medal of Honor.
- Sir Christopher Cockerell, 88, English engineer and inventor of the hovercraft.
- Olivier Debré, 79, French abstract painter.
- Mr. Prospector, 29, American thoroughbred racehorse, complications from colic.
- Gert Ledig, 77, German writer.
- Cris Miró, 33, Argentine entertainer and media personality, lymphoma.
- Bjørn Spiro, 90, Danish film actor.

=== 2 ===
- Abdulaziz Al-Saqqaf, 47, Yemeni human rights activist and journalist, traffic collision.
- Václav Benda, 52, Czech Roman Catholic activist and mathematician.
- Junior Braithwaite, 50, Jamaican reggae musician, shot.
- Keith Gledhill, 88, American tennis player.
- Yevhen Ivchenko, 60, Soviet Belarusian athlete and Olympic medalist (1972, 1980).
- Blagoje Jovovic, Montenegrin Serb World War II Partisan and Chetnik.
- Ron Reynolds, 71, English football goalkeeper.
- Andy Simpkins, 67, American jazz bassist, stomach cancer.
- Robert Sobel, 68, American writer and academic.

=== 3 ===
- Italo Allodi, 71, Italian football player and manager.
- Helge Bronée, 77, Danish footballer.
- Peter Brough, 83, English radio ventriloquist.
- Bernardin Mungul Diaka, 65, Congolese/Zairean diplomat and politician.
- Ralph Foster, 81, American football player (Chicago Cardinals).
- J. Edward Lumbard, 97, American circuit judge (United States Court of Appeals for the Second Circuit).
- Romolo Marcellini, 88, Italian film director and screenwriter.
- Charlene Pryer, 77, American baseball player.
- Myron Weiner, 68, American political scientist and scholar.

=== 4 ===
- Ann Brown, 56, British psychologist.
- Petro Chevhun, 73, Soviet Ukrainian Olympic middle-distance runner (1952).
- Zachary Fisher, 88, American philanthropist and businessman.
- G. S. Maddala, 66, Indian-American economist and mathematician.
- John McKeithen, 81, American lawyer, politician and governor of Louisiana.
- Mike Mikulak, 86, American gridiron football player (Chicago Cardinals).
- Dick Stovall, 77, American football player (Detroit Lions, Washington Redskins).
- Yury Vasilyev, 59, Soviet and Russian stage and film actor.
- Guillermo Weller, 86, Argentine Olympic racewalker (1952, 1960).

=== 5 ===
- Magne Kleiven, 77, Norwegian Olympic gymnast (1952).
- Menil Mavraides, 67, American football player (Philadelphia Eagles).
- Robert Merritt, Nova Scotia playwright and film critic.
- Mel Tormé, 73, American singer and musician, stroke.
- Ernie Wilkins, 76, American jazz saxophonist, conductor and arranger, stroke.

=== 6 ===
- Hans-Georg Fehn, 55, German Olympic water polo player (1968).
- Lisy Fischer, 98, Swiss pianist, child prodigy.
- Anne Haddy, 68, Australian actress, renal failure.
- Ilya Musin, 95, Soviet conductor and a theorist of conducting.
- Fred Provo, 77, American football player (Green Bay Packers).
- Manuel Ramos, 56, Mexican boxer, heart attack.
- Eddie Stanky, 83, American baseball player and manager, heart attack.

=== 7 ===
- Bob Garber, 70, American baseball player (Pittsburgh Pirates).
- Lady June, 68, English painter, poet and musician, heart attack.
- Paul Oskar Kristeller, 94, German-American scholar of renaissance humanism.
- Victor Otiev, 64, Soviet / Russian painter and graphic artist.
- Charles D. Palmer, 97, United States Army general, cardiac arrest.
- Paco Stanley, 56, Mexican television entertainer, shot.
- Joseph Vandernoot, 84, British conductor.

=== 8 ===
- Piet Blom, 65, Dutch architect.
- Ted James, 92, American football player (Frankford Yellow Jackets), and coach.
- Zofia Kuratowska, 67, Polish physician and politician.
- Corrado Mantoni, 74, Italian actor and radio and television host, lung cancer.
- Rosy McHargue, 97, American jazz clarinetist.
- Karl Z. Morgan, 91, American physicist and radiation health physics pioneer.
- Brian Shorland, 89, New Zealand organic chemist.
- Emiliano Tardif, 71, Canadian missionary, heart complications.
- Gordon Towers, 79, Canadian politician and lieutenant governor of Alberta.
- Fred Wampler, 89, American politician, member of the United States House of Representatives (1959–1961).

=== 9 ===
- Al Bates, 94, American Olympic athlete (1928).
- Ernesto Calindri, 90, Italian theater and film actor, stroke.
- Heimo Haitto, 74, Finnish-American classical violinist.
- Maurice Journeau, 100, French composer.
- Saurabh Kalia, 22, Indian Army officer.
- Giles Sutherland Rich, 95, American judge and influential patent attorney, lymphoma.
- Andrew L. Stone, 96, American screenwriter, film director and producer.
- Ray Yagiello, 75, American football coach.

=== 10 ===
- Manlio Busoni, 92, Italian film and television actor.
- Kenneth S. Davis, 86, American historian.
- Béla Egresi, 77, Hungarian football player.
- Henry Grunfeld, 95, German-British merchant banker.
- Sid Levine, 80, American basketball player.
- Grete Natzler, 92, Austrian actress and operatic soprano.
- Jerry Elizalde Navarro, 75, Filipino artist.
- Joe Smyth, 70, American basketball player (New York Knicks, Baltimore Bullets).
- Leonard Thornton, 82, New Zealand Army officer.
- Oswald Tippo, 87, American botanist and educator.
- Jiří Vršťala, 78, Czech film actor.
- J. E. Caerwyn Williams, 87, Welsh scholar.
- Chen Xilian, 84, Chinese Army general and politician.

=== 11 ===
- Gene Anderson, 81, American basketball player.
- Gilles Châtelet, 55, French philosopher and mathematician, suicide.
- DeForest Kelley, 79, American actor (Star Trek, Gunfight at the O.K. Corral, Apache Uprising), stomach cancer.
- Arnie Kullman, 71, Canadian ice hockey player (Boston Bruins).
- Viljo Nousiainen, 55, Finnish high jumping coach.
- Gordon Stirling, 74, Australian politician.

=== 12 ===
- Ola Bauer, 55, Norwegian novelist and playwright, cancer.
- Jean Capdouze, 56, French rugby player.
- Sergey Khlebnikov, 43, Russian Olympic speed skater (1980, 1984), drowned.
- Jah Lloyd, 51, Jamaican reggae singer, deejay and record producer, asthma.
- Joseph Marcello, 75, mobster from Louisiana, United States.
- J. F. Powers, 81, American novelist and short-story writer.
- Jalagam Vengala Rao, 78, Indian politician.
- Bib Stillwell, 71, Australian racing driver.
- Gerd Tellenbach, 95, German historian and scholar.
- Aleksandras Štromas, 68, Lithuanian political scientist, dissident and author.

=== 13 ===
- Gabriel Grüner, 35, Italian photojournalist, shot by Yugoslavian soldiers.
- Volker Krämer, 56, German journalist, shot by Yugoslavian soldiers.
- Carlos Kroeber, 64, Brazilian actor.
- Igor Ksenofontov, 60, Soviet and Russian figure skating coach, heart failure.
- Jørgen Olesen, 75, Danish football player and Olympian (1952).
- Kjell Rosén, 78, Swedish football player and Olympian (1948).
- Douglas Seale, 85, English actor (Aladdin, Ernest Saves Christmas, Amadeus).
- Diablo Velasco, 80, Mexican professional wrestler

=== 14 ===
- Henri Baruk, 101, French neuropsychiatrist.
- Kurt Blaukopf, 85, Austrian music sociologist.
- Américo Bonetti, 71, Argentine Olympic boxer (1952).
- Jack M. Campbell, 82, American politician.
- Louis Diamond, 97, American pediatrician, known as the "father of pediatric hematology".
- Osvaldo Dragún, 70, Argentine playwright.
- Bernie Faloney, 66, Canadian football player, colorectal cancer.
- Anna McCune Harper, 96, American tennis player.
- Mauricio de la Lama, 79, Mexican Olympic sailor (1960, 1964).
- Henry "Junjo" Lawes, 51, Jamaican record producer, drive-by shooting.
- Cecil Morgan, 100, American politician.
- Ray Peterson, 85, American football player (Green Bay Packers).
- Hann Trier, 83, German artist.

=== 15 ===
- Alan Cathcart, 6th Earl Cathcart, 79, British Army officer.
- Sigrid Hunke, 86, German SS-member during World War II, author, and neopagan.
- Igor Kholin, 79, Russian poet and fiction writer, liver cancer.
- Gene Markland, 79, American baseball player (Philadelphia Athletics).
- Sherman A. Minton, 80, American physician, herpetologist and toxinologist.
- Leszek Molenda, 45, Polish Olympic volleyball player (1980).
- Fausto Papetti, 76, Italian alto saxophone player.
- Fred Tiedt, 63, Irish boxer and Olympic silver medalist (1956).

=== 16 ===
- Svend Aage Frederiksen, 79, Danish Olympic hammer thrower (1948).
- Lennart Geijer, 89, Swedish politician and lawyer.
- James Ottaway, 90, British film, television and stage actor.
- Lawrence Stone, 79, English historian of early modern Britain, Parkinson's disease.
- Screaming Lord Sutch, 58, English musician and serial parliamentary candidate, suicide by hanging.
- Marshall Wayne, 87, American diver and Olympic champion (1936).

=== 17 ===
- Albert Bailey, 84, Australian politician.
- Stanley Faulder, 61, Canadian convict, execution by lethal injection.
- Basil Hume, 76, English Roman Catholic bishop, cancer.
- A. W. Kuchler, 91, German-American geographer and naturalist.
- Bertino de Souza, 66, Brazilian Olympic sports shooter (1972, 1976).
- Paul-Émile de Souza, 68, Beninese army officer and political figure.
- Lynn E. Stalbaum, 79, American politician, member of the United States House of Representatives (1965–1967).

=== 18 ===
- Loyd Arms, 79, American football player (Chicago Cardinals).
- Kim Bærentzen, 93, Danish Olympic fencer (1928, 1936).
- Ross Baillie, 21, Scottish track and field athlete, complications from anaphylaxis.
- Dircinha Batista, 77, Brazilian actress and singer.
- Bob Bullock, 69, American politician from Texas, cancer.
- Martin Hansen, 73, Danish Olympic boxer (1948).
- Robert G. Neumann, 83, American politician and diplomat.
- Lothar Ulsaß, 58, German football player, stroke.
- ʻAlī Ṭanṭāwī, 90, Syrian Salafi jurist, writer, and broadcaster.

=== 19 ===
- Henri, Count of Paris, 90, French nobleman, Orleanist pretender to the throne, prostate cancer.
- Saeed Emami, 41, Iranian deputy minister of intelligence, suicide by poisoning.
- Oton Gliha, 85, Croatian artist.
- Heloísa Helena, 81, Brazilian actress and singer.
- Leslie Holdridge, 91, American botanist and climatologist.
- Kamal el-Din Hussein, 78, Egyptian military officer and politician, liver cancer.
- Arvid Pardo, 85, Maltese-Swedish diplomat and academic.
- Ronald Robinson, 78, British historian.
- Mario Soldati, 92, Italian writer and film director.
- Leonard P. Stavisky, 73, American politician and academic, complications from a cerebral hemorrhage.
- Cesáreo Victorino, 52, Mexican football player and Olympian (1968), traffic collision.

=== 20 ===
- Gautam Chattopadhyay, 51, Indian Bengali singer, songwriter and composer.
- Clifton Fadiman, 95, American author, and radio and television personality, pancreatic cancer.
- T. A. Goudge, 89, Canadian philosopher and university professor.
- Barbara Jeppe, 78, South African botanical artist, pneumonia.
- Iulian Mihu, 72, Romanian film director.
- Bill Smith, 87, American football player (Chicago Cardinals).

=== 21 ===
- Chandrakala, Indian film actress, cancer.
- Edwin Hewitt, 79, American mathematician.
- Danie Jacobs, 95, South African Olympic runner (1928).
- Tuure Junnila, 88, Finnish economist and politician.
- Kami, 27, Japanese rock musician, drummer (Malice Mizer), subarachnoid haemorrhage.
- Karl Krolow, 84, German poet and translator.
- Joe Spudic, 86, American basketball player.
- Ted Wolf, 76, American writer.

=== 22 ===
- Wassila Ben Ammar, 87, First Lady of Tunisia (1962–1986).
- Mark Anthony Bracegirdle, 86, British-Australian marxist revolutionary.
- Michael Bredl, 83, German Volksmusik musician, -collector, and -publisher.
- Luboš Fišer, 63, Czech composer.
- Eugenio Florit, 95, Cuban writer, essayist, radio actor and diplomat.
- Guy Tunmer, 50, South African racing driver, traffic collision.

=== 23 ===
- Francisco Rovira Beleta, 85/86, Spanish screenwriter and film director.
- Ondřej Bureš, 32, Czech Olympic swimmer (1988).
- Bert Haas, 85, American baseball player.
- Aziz Ishak, 85, Malaysian freedom fighter, politician and journalist.
- Carl Lange, 89, German film actor.
- Buster Merryfield, 78, British actor (Only Fools and Horses), brain cancer.
- Pierre Perrault, 71, Canadian documentary film director.
- Bill Puddy, 82, Canadian swimmer and Olympian (1936).
- Grels Teir, 83, Finnish lawyer and politician.

=== 24 ===
- Jim Allen, 72, English playwright.
- Pela Atroshi, 19, Kurdish murder victim, murder by firearm.
- Takehiko Bessho, 76, Japanese baseball player.
- Hugh Carter, 78, American politician and businessman.
- Geoff Lawson, 54, British car designer, stroke.
- Dorothy Lee, 88, American actress and comedian, respiratory failure.
- Jack Mullin, 85, American sound engineer.
- Joe Redington, 82, American dog musher and co-founder of the Iditarod Trail Sled Dog Race, cancer.
- Bob Regh, 86, American basketball player.
- Seán Thomas, 98, Irish football manager.

=== 25 ===
- Peter Abeles, 75, Austrian-Australian businessman.
- Rawilja Agletdinowa, 39, Soviet middle-distance runner, traffic collision.
- Vincent Deeney, 84, American Olympic rower (1948).
- Charlie English, 89, American Major League Baseball player (Chicago White Sox, New York Giants, Cincinnati Reds).
- Fred Feast, 69, British actor (Coronation Street), cancer.
- Tommy Ivan, 88, Canadian ice hockey coach and general manager, complications of a kidney ailment.
- Angus MacDonald, 60, Scottish bagpiper and composer.
- Yevgeny Morgunov, 72, Soviet and Russian actor, film director, and script writer, stroke.
- Kōzō Murashita, 46, Japanese singer-songwriter, brain hemorrhage.
- Oliver Ocasek, 73, American politician, liver cancer, colorectal cancer.
- Jorge Góngora Ojeda, 92, Peruvian football player.
- Józef Oźmin, 96, Polish painter.
- Walter Pilling, 64, British wrestler and Olympian (1960, 1964).
- Lars Svensson, 72, Swedish ice hockey goaltender and Olympic medalist (1952, 1956).
- Frank Tarloff, 83, American screenwriter who was blacklisted, cancer.
- Fred Trump, 93, American real estate developer and father of Donald Trump, pneumonia.

=== 26 ===
- Angelo Bertelli, 78, American gridiron football player, brain cancer.
- Charles Collins, 95, American singer and actor, pneumonia.
- Muza Krepkogorskaya, 74, Soviet and Russian theater and film actress.
- Tim Layana, 35, American baseball player (Cincinnati Reds, San Francisco Giants), traffic collision.
- Jiří Pelikán, 76, Czech journalist and politician, cancer.
- John R. Philip, 72, Australian physicist and hydrologist.
- Bobs Watson, 68, American actor and methodist minister, prostate cancer.

=== 27 ===
- Fernando Alvarez, 61, American thoroughbred horse racing jockey and trainer.
- Harriet P. Dustan, American physician.
- Einar Englund, 83, Finnish composer.
- Kōji Horaguchi, 45, Japanese rugby player, traffic collision.
- Wilhelm Höttl, 84, Austrian Nazi and holocaust perpetrator during World War II.
- Isaac C. Kidd, Jr., 79, American admiral, cancer.
- John Langridge, 89, English cricket player.
- Siegfried Lowitz, 84, German actor.
- Marion Motley, 79, American football player (Cleveland Browns), prostate cancer.
- George Papadopoulos, 80, Greek politician, Prime Minister (1967–1973) and dictator, cancer.
- Truus van Aalten, 88, Dutch actress.
- Alfred Robens, Baron Robens of Woldingham, 88, English trade unionist, politician and industrialist.

=== 28 ===
- Padmapani Acharya, 30, Indian Army officer.
- Vere Bird, 88, first Prime Minister of Antigua and Barbuda.
- Louis Ducatel, 97, French politician and businessman.
- Neikezhakuo Kengurüse, 24, Indian Army officer.
- Hilde Krahl, 82, Austrian film actress.
- Eugenio Lopez, Jr., 70, Filipino businessman, cancer.
- Liubomir Petrov, 86, Bulgarian footballer.
- Sir John Woolf, 86, British film producer.
- Anatoliy Zheglanov, 56, Soviet Ukrainian ski-jumper and Olympian (1968, 1972).

=== 29 ===
- Bob Bryant, 62, American football player (Dallas Texans).
- Allan Carr, 62, American film, television and theatre producer (La Cage aux Folles), liver cancer.
- Michael Hooker, 53, American academic, complications of non-Hodgkin's lymphoma.
- Nils Johansson, 79, Swedish Olympic cyclist (1948).
- Karekin I, 66, Syrian Catholicos of the Armenian Apostolic Church, cancer.
- Declan Mulholland, 66, Northern Irish actor, heart attack.
- Constance Shacklock, 86, English contralto.
- Bert Shefter, 97, Russian-American film composer.

=== 30 ===
- Bob Backus, 72, American track and field athlete, hammer throw world record holder and Olympian (1952).
- Édouard Boubat, 75, French photojournalist and art photographer, leukemia.
- Clifford Charles Butler, 77, English physicist.
- Dean Fredericks, 75, American film and television actor, cancer.
- Jintu Gogoi, 28, Indian Army officer.
- Jon Jenkins, 73, American football player (Baltimore Colts, New York Yanks).
- Walter Johnson, 56, American gridiron football player (Cleveland Browns, Cincinnati Bengals).
- Marta Labarr, 87, French-American singer and actress.
- Beveridge Webster, 91, American pianist and educator.
