= F. William Summers =

Librarian and educator

President of the American Library Association
- In office 1988–1989
- Preceded by: Margaret E. Chisholm
- Succeeded by: Patricia Wilson Berger

Personal details
- Born: February 8, 1933 Jacksonville, Florida, US
- Died: August 12, 2016 (aged 83) Tallahassee, Florida, US
- Education: Florida State University; Rutgers University
- Occupation: Librarian, educator

F. William Summers (February 8, 1933 – August 12, 2016) was an American librarian and educator in library and information science. Summers held a number of leadership positions in the American Library Association, including serving as the organization's president from 1988 to 1989.

== Education and career ==
Frank "Bill" William Summers was born on February 8, 1933, in Jacksonville, Florida, where he also grew up. He graduated from Florida State University with a Bachelor of Arts in 1955. From 1955 to 1957, Summers served in the U.S. Navy Taiwan Command. He went on to earn a Master of Library Science in 1959 and Ph.D. in 1979, both from Rutgers University.

Summers' first job in a library was as a children's librarian at Jacksonville Public Library. Other positions he held included working as a librarian at the Linden Public Library, as the library director for the Cocoa Public Schools, and as the head of the Florida State Library for five years.

Summers joined the University of South Carolina in 1971, helping to plan the school's new Master of Library Science program; he served as the dean of the library school from 1976 to 1985. In the spring of 1985 he became the third dean of the Florida State University School of Information; Summers was dean of the school until 1994. He also served twice as interim director for the Florida State University Strozier Library.

== Library leadership ==
Summers served in a number of roles in American Library Association (ALA) leadership, including chairing the Committee on Accreditation from 1970 to 1974 and the Committee on Program Evaluation and Support from 1978 to 1982. He served as president of the Association for Library and Information Science Education in 1981. He also was president of Beta Phi Mu, the international honor society for library and information science.

Running on a platform of encouraging leadership in youth librarianship, Summers was elected as president of ALA in 1987, serving from 1988 to 1989. ALA awarded him the Joseph W. Lippincott Award in 1996 for a lifetime of extraordinary dedication to the field of librarianship. Every year, the Florida State University School of Information gives out the F. William Summers Award to an outstanding master’s or specialist student.

== Selected publications ==
- Summers, F. William; Fraser, Bruce T.; Landry, Marie; Burnett, Gary (1999). Florida libraries are education: Report of a statewide study of the educational role of public libraries. Tallahassee, Fla.: School of Information Studies, Florida State University.
- Curran, Charles C.; Summers, F. William, eds. (1990). Library performance, accountability, and responsiveness: Essays in honor of Ernest R. DeProspo. Westport, CT: Praeger.
- Summers, F. William (1982). "Education for reference service". In Schlachter, Gail A. (ed.). The service imperative for libraries: Essays in honor of Margaret E. Monroe. Littleton, Colo.: Libraries Unlimited. pp. 157–168. ISBN 9780872872721. OCLC 8476770.
- Summers, F. William, ed. (Fall 1977). "Trends in the governance of libraries". Library Trends. 26 (2): 157–298.

=== Selected reports ===
- Summers, F. William; Franklin, Hardy R. (1974). Evaluative study of the Neighborhood Information Center Project: Report to the Cleveland Public Library. Cleveland, Ohio: Cleveland Public Library s.
- Blasingame, Ralph; Renard, James; Summers, F. William (1968). Survey of Ohio libraries and State Library services: A report to the State Library Board. Columbus, Ohio: Ohio State Library Board.

== Personal life and death ==
His wife, Lorraine Summers, was the Assistant State Librarian of Florida and served as president of the Association of Specialized and Cooperative Library Agencies. Bill Summers died in Tallahassee, Florida, on August 12, 2016.
