= Mark Erstling =

American businessman

- Education: University of Florida
- Known for: Serving as the Vice President of the Association of Public Television Stations

Mark Erstling is the Executive Vice President and COO for the Association of Public Television Stations. He has been with this organization since 2001, and he is in charge of the daily activities and business necessities of the Association.

Prior to this position, he served as the general manager of WPSX-TV and WPSU-FM. Before that position he was employed by the Pennsylvania Public Television Network Commission. Lastly, he has also served as a director and producer for WJCT.

== Education ==
- Erstling graduated with a degree in Telecommunications from the University of Florida in 1975.
