= Shootings of Gabriel Grüner and Volker Krämer =

1999 shootings of two journalists

Gabriel Grüner
- Born: August 8, 1963; Mals, Italy
- Disappeared: June 13, 1999; Delje Pass near Prizren
- Status: found shot
- Died: June 13, 1999: 35 years old The hospital in Tetovo, Macedonia
- Cause of death: Shot
- Body discovered: June 13, 1999 by British Soldiers
- Resting place: Italy
- Education: University of Innsbruck
- Occupation: Photojournalist
- Years active: 8 years
- Employer: Stern magazine
- Known for: Reporting on focal points in the world
- Partner: Beatrix Gerstberger
- Children: A son
- Awards: World Press Photo Award; The Royal Society of Photography

Volker Krämer
- Born: October 12, 1943? Hilden, Germany
- Died: June 13, 1999; Kosovo, Yugoslavia
- Cause of death: Murdered
- Body discovered: Died immediately from gun shots
- Occupation: Journalist/ Photographer
- Years active: 30 years
- Employer: Stern magazine

Gabriel Grüner and Volker Krämer were two journalists for Stern magazine who were shot by Yugoslavian soldiers at a check point at the Dulje Pass on the west side of Kosovo, near the village of Dulje, Prizrenski Podgor about 25 km from Prizren, two days after the Kosovo War had ended on June 13, 1999.

The pair of journalists were the first civilians from a NATO country to be killed during the war. Their translator Senol Alit was also killed on site.

== Gabriel Grüner ==
=== Personal ===
Gabriel Grüner was born on August 8, 1963, in Mals, Italy. He studied at the University of Innsbruck, Innsbruck, Austria. Grüner's girlfriend was Beatrix Gerstberger, who was six months pregnant with their first child Jakob at the time of his death. He was killed at the age of 35 and was buried in Italy. Gerstberger, also a journalist, wrote a book where she documented her own story about Grüner and collected the stories of other women who had lost their husbands.

=== Career ===
Grüner started his journalism career in 1991, and worked for eight years before he was killed. He was reporting from around the world and had been to Afghanistan, Algerien, Sudan. He was awarded several awards for his great works, such as the World Press Photo Award and the Royal Society of Photography.

== Volker Krämer ==
=== Personal ===
Volker Krämer was possibly born on October 12, 1943, in Germany. "Volker has done an extraordinary job, so he has been able to work for the Stern for so long, because he can choose between the best photographers in the world and therefore he is very good at work, which was also fun to him," stated one of his classmates. Not much information can be recovered from his personal life. He was encouraged in his career by his mother. He took notes on different things in addition to taking photographs. However, photography was what he loved to do. He and his mother would travel together and he would take photos that inspired him. He worked for the Stern magazine for many years. He once said: "When I am a reporter, I move in the everyday lives of normal people, and through the camera I notice how absurd and partially funny which sometimes looks."

=== Career ===
Krämer worked for the Stern magazine for about thirty years. He had been with the company longer than Grüner. He started his career as a 3-year apprentice for Rheinische Post publishing house in Düsseldorf before he was hired on to the Stern. He only photographed for the Stern on occasion. An exhibition of his pictures was organized with the help of the then-director of the Wilhelm Fabry School, Hans-Gunther Eckerth. He wrote notes and observed the focal points of the world through his photographs. He was inspired to take pictures for the Stern from his earlier years taking pictures on his own time. He was described as having a unique point of view. He was also drawn to crisis areas, which were not safe for photographers. He took pictures and captured information there that he would return to the Stern newsweekly. He played a big role in the magazine and dedicated a lot of his personal time to his stories. One of his most famous articles is based on the topic of home births.

== Death ==
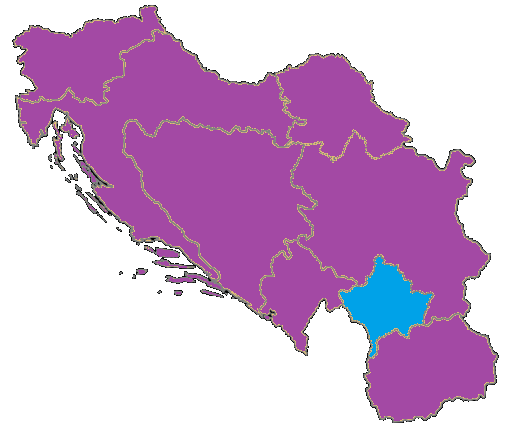
Kosovo, Yugoslavia

On June 13, 1999, at the Dulje Pass in Kosovo both journalists were shot and killed when they were caught in an ambush. As they were heading back on the "safe route" across the Dulje Pass, they came across a checkpoint by Yugoslavian soldiers. They were then chased. As they tried to escape, they were shot. Krämer died immediately from shots fired and Grüner succumbed to his wounds later at the hospital. They were there reporting on German lifestyles and taking photographs of the country. There is no set cause as to why they were shot and killed.

To this day, it is still unclear whether they were in unmarked cars. They were driving around looking for mass graves. As they were going to take photographs and take notes to return the information. They then lost track of where they were and needed help getting back home.

They approached Yugoslavia troops, who said they would show them where the graves were and help them return. However, that is not how it played out. The soldiers had lied to them. They tried escaping, but could not get away.

Unable to get away, Krämer was shot in the head and died immediately after the wound. It is said that his body laid there for several hours. A Spiegel editor photographed his body from a safe distance. Grüner, however, was badly wounded by gunfire. He was found by British soldiers and taken to a hospital in Tetovo, Macedonia. Grüner was pronounced dead later that day.

The reason for the soldiers' shooting of the pair is still unknown.

== Impact ==
The deaths had a paralyzing effect on the editorial staff of Stern, since they were not the first journalists to be killed working for that company. Research into their deaths conducted by other Stern editors proved difficult, due to them being emotional involvement. Relatives were relieved that an investigation into the circumstances of the death had been conducted, but not about how the results were eventually published.

== Reactions ==
In reaction to the journalist's deaths, people opened their eyes to the dangers that these men face on a day-to-day basis. Precautions were starting to be made in these countries when journalists were traveling. At the time of their death, they had no security as they could walk around freely. Because of this, reforms have been created to ensure the safety of journalists and their staff. Refugees are no longer to stand on the lines of the killing field. More troops were called into the area. Their deaths had a negative impact on the magazine, but ultimately brought about new policies.

== Gabriel-Grüner-Grant ==
In 1999, the Gabriel-Grüner-Grant was initiated in memory of the murdered journalists. The grant is being awarded annually for courageous pieces of journalism. It is valued at EUR 6,000.

== Memorial ==
There is a memorial stone for Grüner and Krämer at the Dulje Pass, Kosovo.

== See also ==
- List of journalists killed in Europe
