= Beverly P. Lynch =

American librarian and academic (born 1936)

President of the American Library Association
- In office 1985–1986
- Preceded by: E. J. Josey
- Succeeded by: Regina Minudri

Personal details
- Born: Beverly Pfeifer; December 27, 1936 (age 89)
- Spouse: John A. Lynch (died 2016)
- Education: North Dakota State University; University of Illinois at Urbana–Champaign; University of Wisconsin–Madison
- Occupation: Librarian

Beverly P. Lynch is an American scholar, professor, librarian, and administrator. She was president of the American Library Association from 1985 to 1986. She is currently Professor Emerita at the UCLA School of Education and Information Studies.

== Early life and education ==
Lynch was born in Fargo, North Dakota on December 27, 1936. She earned a Bachelor of Science degree with majors in English and music from North Dakota State University, a Masters of Science degree in library sciences from the University of Illinois at Urbana–Champaign, and a Ph.D. from the University of Wisconsin–Madison.

== Career ==
Early in her career, Lynch worked in the libraries of Yale University, University of Illinois at Urbana-Champaign, and Marquette University, as well as the Plymouth (England) Public Library.

Lynch was executive secretary of the Association of College and Research Libraries from 1972 to 1977. She was the university librarian at the University of Illinois at Chicago from 1977 to 1989.

In 1989 Lynch was appointed dean of the University of California Los Angeles UCLA School of Education and Information Studies. She also directed the UCLA Library Senior Fellows program from 1991 to 2017, a program has been described by the UCLA Library as "the longest-running leadership development program in the academic library profession."

From 2000 to 2001 she took leave from UCLA to lead the Center for Research Libraries.

Returning to UCLA she became the first director of UCLA's California Rare Book School.

She served as president of the American Library Association from 1985 to 1986. Her papers are held at the American Library Association Archives.

== Awards and legacy ==
Lynch was known for developing and publishing long-term strategies for librarian education, as well as writing about change management in academic libraries and libraries as organizations.

In 1987, she was honored as a distinguished alumna by the University of Illinois Urbana-Champaign. She received a similar honor in 2009 from the University of Wisconsin at Madison.

Lynch won the highest honors from the American Library Association. She was awarded the Joseph W. Lippincott Award in 2009, Melvil Dewey Medal in 2012 and the Beta Phi Mu Award for distinguished service to education for librarianship education in 2015. In 2013 she was named the 28th Library Luminary of the Illinois Library Association.

== Personal life ==
Lynch was married to John A. Lynch in 1968. He died in 2016.

== Selected publications ==
- Galvin, Thomas J.; Lynch, Beverly P., eds. (1982). Priorities for Academic Libraries. Jossey-Bass.
- Lynch, Beverly P., ed. (1985). Management Strategies for Libraries: A Basic Reader. Neal-Schuman.
- Lynch, Beverly P. (1989). The Academic Library in Transition: Planning for the 1990s. Neal-Schuman.
- Lynch, Beverly P., ed. (1995). Information Technology and the Remaking of the University Library. Jossey-Bass.

Non-profit organization positions
Preceded by E. J. Josey	President of the American Library Association; 1985–1986	Succeeded by Regina Minudri
