= Regina Minudri =

American librarian (1937–2021)

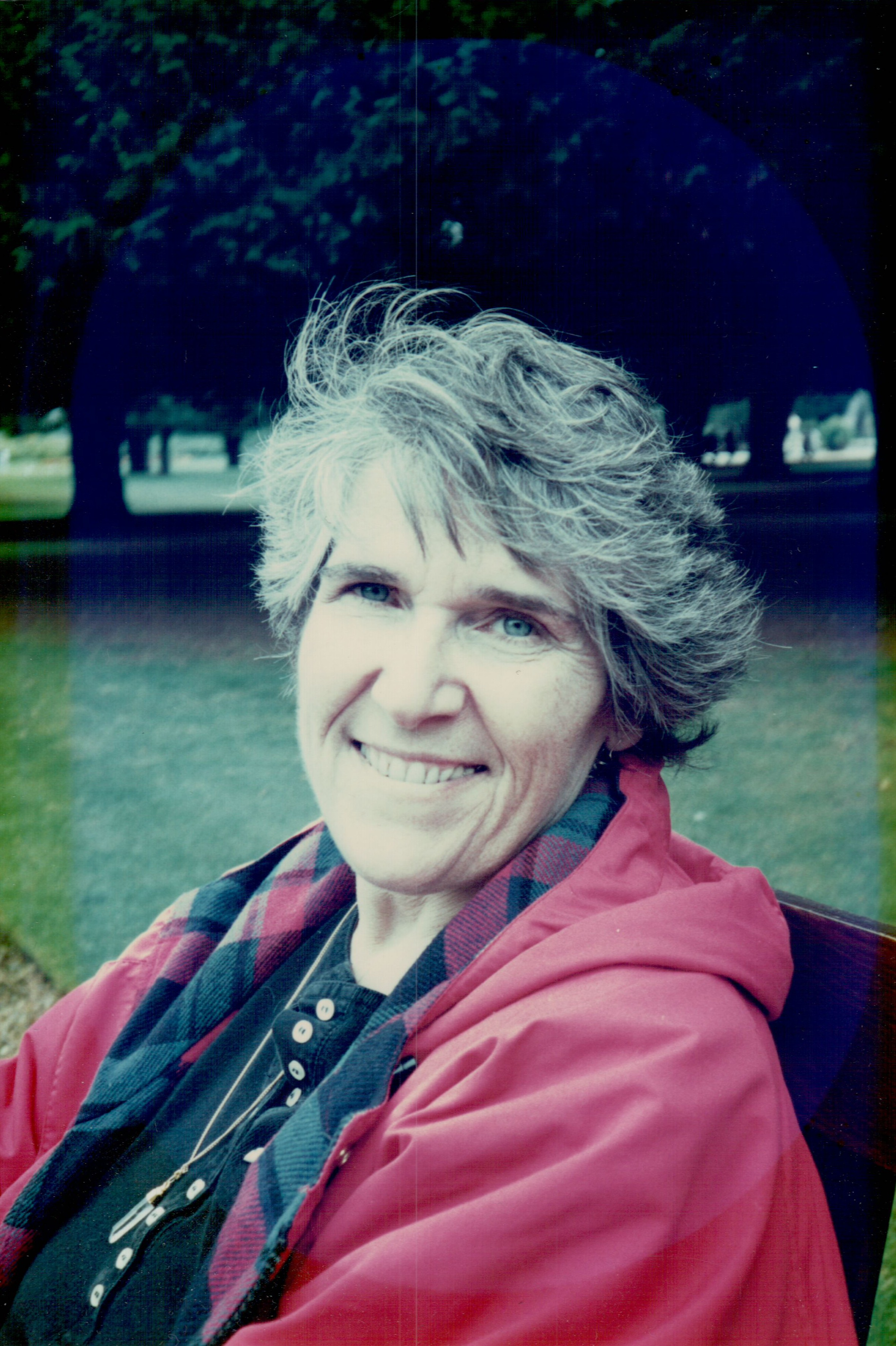

President of the American Library Association
- In office 1986–1987
- Preceded by: Beverly P. Lynch
- Succeeded by: Margaret E. Chisholm

Personal details
- Born: May 9, 1937
- Died: June 18, 2021 (aged 84)
- Education: San Francisco College for Women, University of California, Berkeley
- Occupation: Librarian

Regina Ursula Minudri (May 9, 1937 – June 18, 2021) was an American librarian best known as an outspoken proponent for public libraries and library services to young people. She served as president of the American Library Association from 1986 to 1987.

== Early life and education ==
Regina Minudri, known as Gina, was born in San Francisco on May 9, 1937.

Minudri earned a bachelor's degree from the San Francisco College for Women and received her Master of Library Science from the University of California, Berkeley in 1959.

== Career ==
At the beginning of her career Minudri worked at a series of public libraries in Northern California, including at Menlo Park Public Library from 1959 to 1962, Santa Clara Library from 1962 to 1968, and as the assistant county librarian of Alameda County Library from 1972 to 1977. In 1977 she became director of the Berkeley Public Library, a position she held until her retirement in 1994. While head of Berkeley Public Library, Minudri worked towards the successful passage of four library tax measures to provide a steady stream of reliable funding for the library, as well as leading a successful campaign for a $49 million bond measure. She developed several community-focused organizations, including the Berkeley Tool Lending Library in 1979 as well as the Berkeley Information Network. Upon her retirement from Berkeley Public Library, the library's young adult room was named after Minudri.

In 1997 Minudri was elected as the acting chief of the San Francisco Public Library system. She served in the role of San Francisco City Librarian, receiving high praise for stabilizing the library's budget, hired a chief financial officer, and improving the morale at the library system. Minudri suffered a stroke in May 1999 that prevented her from continuing in the role.

She also taught as a lecturer for library schools of the University of California, Berkeley and San Jose State University.

== Library leadership ==
Minudri served as president of the California Library Association in 1981, testifying on behalf of both public and academic libraries in the state legislature.

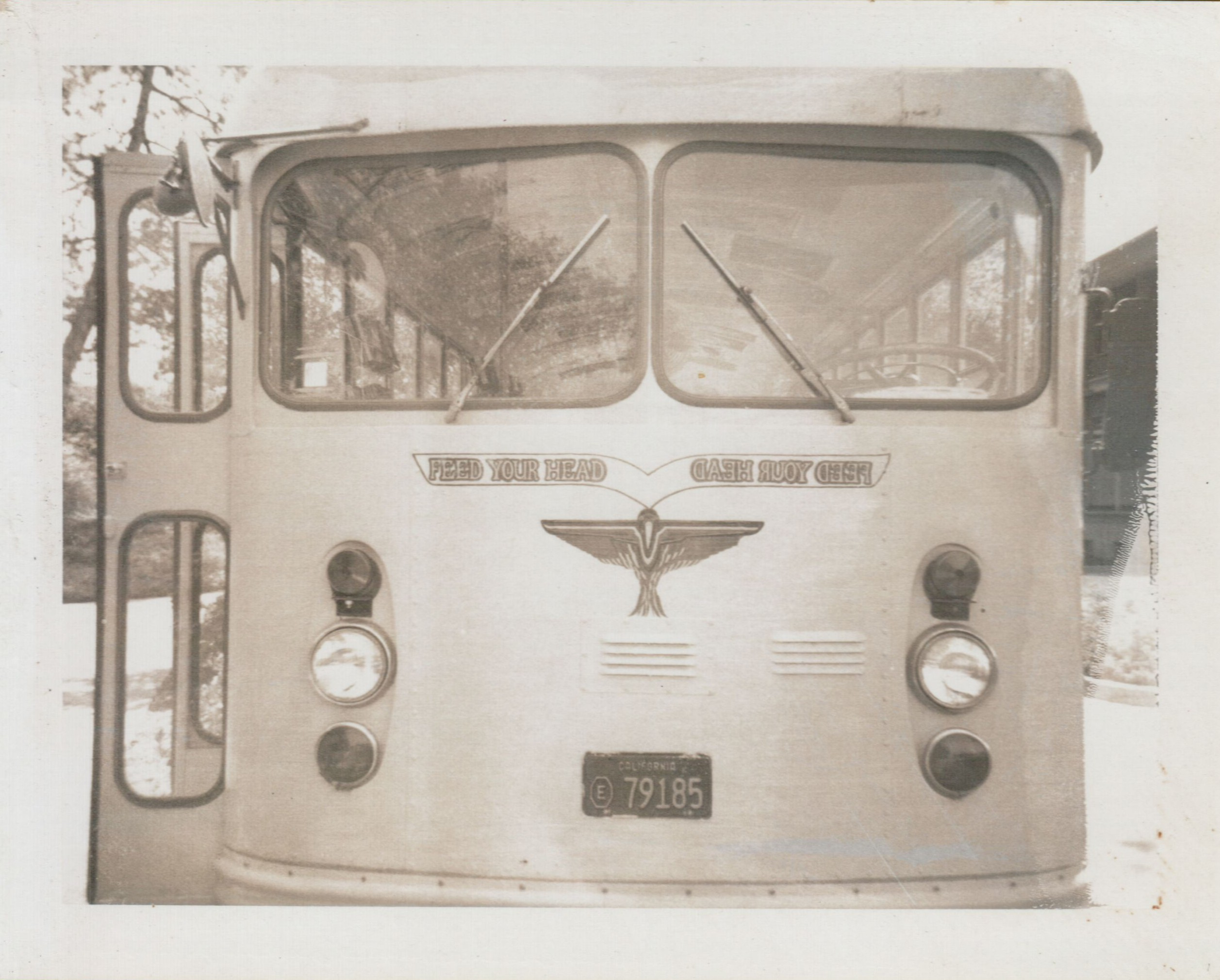
Young Adult Project Mobile

She became president of the American Library Association in 1986. Minudri campaigned for president on the issues of validating the ALA-accredited Master of Library Science and increasing the visibility of pay equity for librarians as a national issue, drawing on her experience of winning a special equity adjustment for Berkeley Public Library staff.

== Awards and recognition ==
In 1974 Minudri received the American Library Association's Grolier Foundation Award for the promotion of reading by children and young people.

She was elected into the California Library Hall of Fame in 2012. The Hall of Fame recognition honored her work as an "outspoken proponent for public libraries."

The Regina U. Minudri Young Adult Scholarship is given annually by ALA to a master's student in library science who intends to work with young adults in public libraries.

== Later life and death ==
After her stroke, Minudri recuperated with the help of her partner, Carol Starr, and traveled widely in her retirement. She died in her home in Berkeley, California, on June 18, 2021.
