= Prizrenski Podgor =

The Prizren Podgor (Serbian: Призренски Подгор / Prizrenski Podgor, lit. 'Podgor of Prizren'; or Prizren Podgur, Albanian: Podguri i Prizrenit, lit. 'Podgur of Prizren') is a geographical region in Kosovo, stretching from the branches of the Šar Mountains, from Prizren to the village of Duhël on the Carralevë mountain. It includes the eastern and northeastern part of the Prizren basin (Prizrenska kotlina) and presents its border region towards the Šar župe of Sirinićka župa and Sredačka župa. It is a sub-region of Metohija. It includes the villages of Skorobišta, Dojnicë, Grnčare, Novoselë, Vrbičane, and the urban settlements of Kurillë and Bazhdërhane, and suburb Lubizhdë, of Prizren. It is inhabited by Bosniaks and Albanians and Serbs.

== Geography ==
The region is stretching from the branches of the Šar Mountains, from Prizren to the village of Duhël on the Carralevë mountain. It includes the eastern and northeastern part of the Prizren basin (Prizrenska kotlina) and presents its border region towards the Šar župe of Sirinićka župa and Sredačka župa. It is a sub-region of Metohija.

It includes the villages of Skorobišta, Dojnicë, Grnčare, Novo Selo, Vrbičane, and the urban settlements of Kurillë and Bazhdërhane, and suburb Lubizhdë, of Prizren.

== History ==
In the Middle Ages, it was a župa (county) named Podgor. The Ottomans called the region Havazi.

== Culture ==
It is culturally connected to the Serb-inhabited Sirinićka župa. The locals speak the Podgor speech (Podgorski govor) of the Serbian language; the speech of Skorobište, Grnčare and Novo Selo show Serbian–Macedonian linguistical contact.

== Sources ==
- Dedijer, Jevto (1912). Stara Srbija: geografska i etnografska slika. Srpska književna zadruga.
- Marković, Jovan Đ. (1967). Geografske oblasti Socijalističke Federativne Republike Jugoslavije. Zavod za izdavanje udžbenika Socijalističke Republike Srbije.
- Menković, Mirjana (2004). Kosovo i Metohija u svetlu etnologije: zbornik radova. Етнографски музеј у Београду.
- Radovanović, Milovan (2008). Kosovo i Metohija: antropogeografske, istorijskogeografske, demografske i geopolitičke osnove. Službeni Glasnik. ISBN 9788675497806.
- Radovanović, Milovan (2004). Etnički i demografski procesi na Kosovu i Metohiji. Liber Press. ISBN 9788675560180.
- Radovanović, Milovan. Stanovništvo Prizrenskog Podgora. Muzej Kosova i Metohije.
