= Richard M. Dougherty =

American librarian and educator

President of the American Library Association
- In office 1990–1991
- Preceded by: Patricia Wilson Berger
- Succeeded by: Patricia G. Schuman

Personal details
- Born: January 17, 1935 (age 91)
- Education: Purdue University; Rutgers University
- Occupation: Librarian, educator

Richard M. Dougherty (born January 17, 1935) is an American librarian and educator who was the director of libraries at both the University of California, Berkeley and the University of Michigan. He served as the president of the American Library Association from 1990 to 1991, focusing on bringing attention to information access issues and supporting children's literacy.

== Education and career ==
Dougherty received his Bachelor of Science degree from Purdue University in 1959. He went on to earn his Master of Library Science in 1961 and his Ph.D. degree in 1963, both from Rutgers University.

He held a number of administrative positions in academic libraries, beginning at the University of Colorado as the associate director of libraries from 1966 to 1970. From 1972 to 1978 Dougherty held the position of University Librarian at the University of California, Berkeley.

In 1978 he began working at the University of Michigan Ann Arbor University Library, serving as library director from 1978 to 1988. He was a professor of library science at the University of Michigan School of Library Science from 1978 to 1997, and for a short time served as the acting dean of the school (from 1984 to 1985). As a professor, Dougherty focused his instruction on issues of professional management, ethics, and values. He retired from the University of Michigan at the end of 1997.

After retirement from the University, Dougherty founded Dougherty and Associates. His work specialized in strategic planning and planned change strategies.

== Library leadership ==
In addition to authoring many articles and books, Dougherty helped establish the Journal of Academic Librarianship when it began in 1975 and remained as an editor until 1994.

Dougherty was elected as 1990-1991 president of the American Library Association. During his time as ALA president, Dougherty promoted children's literacy and reading under the banner, "Kids Who Read Succeed." He also called attention to the importance of information access issues and launched the "Campaign for America's Libraries" which included a rally in Atlanta followed by a bus trip with many stops between Atlanta and Washington, DC.

== Awards ==
Dougherty was named the Association of College and Research Libraries Academic or Research Librarian of the Year for 1983, specifically citing his editor role of professional journals, his service to ALA and its divisions, and his leadership as a library administrator at the University of Michigan, the University of Colorado, and the University of California.

He was the first recipient of the ALA's Hugh C. Atkinson Memorial Award in 1988, recognizing the accomplishments of an academic librarian in improving library services.

In 1997 he was awarded the Joseph W. Lippincott Award, given by ALA for "distinguished service to the profession of librarianship".

He was awarded Honorary degrees from his alma mater, Purdue University in 1991 and Stellenbosch University, South Africa in 1995.

== Publications ==
- Dougherty, Richard M. (May–June 2011). "Library Advocacy: One Message, One Voice (Lessons from the 1991 Rally for America's Libraries)". American Libraries: 46–50.
- Dougherty, Richard M. (2008). Streamlining Library Services: What We Do, How Much Time It Takes, What It Costs, and How We Can Do It Better. Lanham, Md.: Scarecrow Press. ISBN 978-0810851986.
- 1992. Dougherty, Richard M., Carol Hughes, and Preferred Library Futures: Charting the Paths: University of Michigan. Mountain View, Calif.: Research Libraries Group.
- Dougherty, Richard M.; Heinritz, Fred J.; Kaske, Neal K. (1982). Scientific Management of Library Operations (2nd ed.). Metuchen, N.J.: Scarecrow Press. p. 274. ISBN 0-8108-1485-4.
- 1982. Dougherty, Richard M. Maintaining the Library’s Excellence : When the Past Will Not Be Prologue. [Ann Arbor]: University of Michigan.
- 1974. Dougherty, Richard M., and Laura L. Blomquist. 1974. Improving Access to Library Resources: The Influence of Organization of Library Collections, and of User Attitudes toward Innovative Services. Metuchen, N.J.: Scarecrow Press.
- 1970. Dougherty, Richard M., and Lawrence E. Leonard. 1970. Management and Costs of Technical Processes: A Bibliographical Review, 1876-1969. Metuchen, N.J.: Scarecrow Press.
- Dougherty, Richard M.; Leonard, Lawrence E.; Maier, Joan M. (1969). Centralized Book Processing: A Feasibility Study Based on Colorado Academic Libraries. Metuchen, N.J.: Scarecrow Press. p. 401. ISBN 978-0810802636.
