= Linden Public Library =

Coordinates: 39°57′8.56″N 74°11′44.83″W

- Location: Linden, NJ
- Established: 1928
- Branches: 1 branch

Access and use
- Circulation: 66,849
- Population served: 15, 200

Other information
- Budget: over $35 million
- Director: Dennis Purves
- Employees: 23
- Website: Linden Public Library

Linden Public Library is a public library system that serves over 30 towns including Linden, Elizabeth, Clark, Roselle, Plainfield in Union County, New Jersey. The Linden Free Public Library maintains an organized system for collecting, storing, and circulating materials for library patrons so that they can be retrieved when needed. There are active Friends of the Library groups associated with two branches. There are approximately 13,091 registered resident borrowers, 1,269 non-resident borrowers, and 72,000 bibliographic records in the catalog. Annual circulation was 66,626 in 2009. The main library offers free wireless access to the Internet and Internet Terminals for public use.

== History ==
The library movement in Linden owes its existence to a small group of citizens and the sponsorship of the Linden Rotary Club. The library operated for six months on a voluntary basis and on January 1, 1928 it became a municipal, tax supported institution. Miss Viola R. Maihl, a professional librarian was one of the first acts of the Board of Trustees to organize the library. In December 1939, the library moved to its present building erected with the aid of a federal grant.

Linden's community and people have been the main concern of the library's administration. The potential patrons are all ages and vary backgrounds. These people request a variety a vast connection of books, periodicals, CDs, DVDs, and musicals. During this time, in order to serve the patrons the best, a system was established consisting of the main library and three branches. During this time, the staff consisted of eight professional librarians, eleven clerical assistants, four librarian trainees and part-time pages. In little more than a quarter of a century the Linden Library has demonstrated its effectiveness in the community and gained the confidence of both the citizenry and governing body. Its growth and expansion is the result of long-term planning and a constant study of the changing needs of the community.

Linden Public Library's mission is to, "satisfy the evolving informational, cultural, educational, and recreational needs of the community, by providing the most modern and relevant resources and facilities". (Adopted by the Linden Board of Trustees March 24, 2002.)

The new Linden Free Public Library facility located at 31 E. Henry St opened its doors in June, 2010.

== Services ==
The services provided by the library include general information, educational and recreational material for the City residents. The material is presented in many formats including books, records, cassettes, newspapers, magazines, movies, interlibrary loan, reference services, children's story hours, and many programs designed to meet the demands of Linden's citizens.

The library is a participating member of LINX, Region IV, Inc. LINX is a pseudonym for Union Middlesex Counties Regional Library Cooperative. LINX is a non-profit organization and is fully funded by the State providing "link services" of library resources for all LINX participating members in Union and Middlesex Counties. Other automated services include BIBLIOFILE, a cataloging program of The Library Corporation. Infotrack is a sophisticated indexing software program of magazine and national newspapers.

== Periodicals ==
Linden Public Library back holds back issues of magazine titles for the current three years expect when indicated. Popular newspaper articles/titles are held for two months and no microfilm is available except for a limited years of the New York Times. Magazines do not circulate.

== M.U.R.A.L ==
"Middlesex Union Reciprocal Associated Libraries (MURAL) is a group of 40 libraries in Union and Middlesex Counties which extends borrowing privileges to card holders in good standing from other member libraries". Any Linden Library card holder in good standings, may borrow materials from other MURAL member library which include Berkeley Heights, Bernardsville, Carteret, Clark, Cranbury, Cranford, Dunellen, Edison, Elizabeth, Fanwood, Garwood, Highland Park, Hillside, Jamesburg, Kenilworth, Linden, Long Branch, Metuchen, Middlesex, Millton, Monore, and many more.

== Friends of the Linden Library ==
The Friends of the Linden Library is an association of people interested in the Library and support and cooperate with the library to focus public on attention on all the services and resources the library has to offer. The Friends of the Linden Library work together to raise money for children's programs, new technology, and provide a variety of resources available to the public. Last year, the Friends of the Linden Library raised over $35,000.00 through a variety of fundraisers. They also have worked with local companies to purchase new 20 computers in 2016. A rolling yearly membership fee of $10 per individual.
