= Patricia Wilson Berger =

American special and administrative librarian

President of the American Library Association
- In office 1989–1990
- Preceded by: F. William Summers
- Succeeded by: Richard M. Dougherty

Personal details
- Born: May 1, 1926
- Died: March 27, 2011 (aged 84) Alexandria, Virginia, US
- Spouse: George H. C. Berger (m. 1970)
- Parents: Thomas Decatur Wood; Nina Hughes
- Education: George Washington University; Catholic University of America

Patricia Wilson Berger (May 1, 1926 – March 27, 2011) was a special and administrative librarian who worked in several professional organizations throughout her career. She was president of the American Library Association.

She was a Fellow of the American Association for the Advancement of Science.

She was a member of the Cosmos Club and Chi Omega

== Life and education ==
Patricia Wilson Berger was born May 1, 1926, to Thomas Decatur Wood and Nina Hughes. She earned her Bachelor of Science degree from George Washington University in 1965 and then her MLS degree at the Catholic University of America in 1974. She married George H.C. Berger on May 20, 1970.

== Career ==
During her career, Berger worked as a special and administrative librarian in several different organizations. These organizations include the National Bureau of Standards, the Institute for Defense Analyses, the United States Patent and Trademark Office, and the Environmental Protection Agency. From there, she became the president of the American Library Association (ALA) in 1989 and held the position until 1990.

While Berger was president of the ALA, she created a committee to help oversee the policies related to preservation. This committee is called The President's Committee on Preservation Policy.

Berger was also involved in the District of Columbia Library Association, Federal Librarians Round Table, ALA's executive board, Virginia State Library Board, ALA Council, Freedom to Read Foundation and the Special Libraries Association.

== Publications ==
- Berger, Patricia Wilson (January 1991). "On My Mind: What I Learned". American Libraries: 102.
- Berger, Patricia W. (1990). "Toward a National Information Policy: What Should We Expect from a Second White House Conference?". The Bottom Line. 3 (2): 11–17.
- Berger, Patricia W. (1983). "System Integration in the Special Library". Resource Sharing & Library Networks. 1 (4): 5–17.
- Berger, Patricia W.; Robinson, Barbara M. (1984). The Role of the Special Library in Networks and Cooperatives (Final Report). Vol. 1. ERIC. ED 250 999.
- Berger, Patricia Wilson (December 1981). Knight, Nancy H. (ed.). Proceedings of a Conference on Telecommunication Technologies, Networking and Libraries. NBS Special Publication 610. Washington, DC: National Bureau of Standards.

== Awards ==
In 2001, Berger was awarded the District of Columbia Library Association President's Award as well as The Catholic University of America's Distinguished Alumna Award.

She was a Fellow of the American Association for the Advancement of Science.

Inaugural recipient of the NISO Fellows Award in 1989.

Non-profit organization positions
| Preceded by F. William Summers | President of the American Library Association; 1989–1990 | Succeeded by Richard M. Dougherty |
