= Margaret E. Chisholm =

American librarian and educator

Margaret Chisholm

President of the American Library Association
- In office 1988–1989
- Preceded by: Regina Minudri
- Succeeded by: F. William Summers

Personal details
- Born: July 25, 1921 Grey Eagle, Minnesota, US
- Died: November 21, 1999 (aged 78) Saratoga, California, US
- Education: University of Washington
- Occupation: Librarian

Margaret Elizabeth Chisholm (July 25, 1921 – November 21, 1999) was an American librarian and educator and served as president of the American Library Association from 1987 to 1988. She promoted librarians as skilled in information technology.

== Early life and education ==
She was born Margaret Elizabeth Bergman to Henry D. and Alice Bergman. She attended St. Cloud University and received a bachelor's degree from the University of Washington in 1951 and her master's degree in library science in 1958. She then began working toward a Ph.D. in administration of higher education.

== Career ==
Chisholm took her first library job as supervisor of elementary school libraries in the Everett, Washington. She later joined the Everett Community College staff as a librarian. She then taught summer courses at the University of Oregon and later hired her a full time faculty position. She taught a televised course on children's literature, where she became aware of the utility of public educational broadcasting.

She received her doctorate in administration of higher education in 1966 and began teaching at the University of New Mexico. In 1967, she accepted a position to lead the media program of the Seattle school system and area libraries. In this new position, Chisholm was put on the executive board of Washington University's television station KCTS as a representative of the Seattle school system.

In 1969, Chisholm moved to the Washington, D.C., area to teach at the University of Maryland. She was named dean of the College of Library and Information Science in 1969 and served in that role until 1975.

From 1975 to 1981, she served as vice president for university relations and development at the University of Washington and the chairperson of KCTS. She was the university's first female vice president. She became director of the University of Washington's Graduate School of Library and Information Science in 1981 and served in that position until she retired in 1992.

== Public broadcasting ==
While Chisholm held her position as vice president of University of Washington's relations and development, she became involved in national efforts for public broadcasting. She was nominated to the board of directors of the Public Broadcasting Service. Dr. Chisholm was involved in PBS's decision to create a new organization, Association for Public Broadcasting, to represent public television station managers' interests and to aid with lobbying and planning efforts of public TV. She served on its interim board of trustees and participated in the search for its first chief executive. From 1979 to 1983, she served as the vice president of the National Association of Public Television Stations executive committee. Chisholm served several terms on the Association for Public Broadcasting Board and remained a trustee at large with the organization, later renamed America's Public Television Stations.

== Publications ==
- "Information technology : design and applications" with Nancy D. Lane (G.K. Hall, 1991) ISBN 0816119090
- "Instructional design and the library media specialist" with Donald P. Ely and David Bender (American Association of School Librarians, 1979) ISBN 0838932347
- "Media personnel in education : a competency approach" with Donald P. Ely (Prentice-Hall, 1976)
- "A general information system for educational technology (ETGIS) : a conceptual scheme" with Donald P. Ely (U.S. Dept. of Health, Education, and Welfare, 1974)

Non-profit organization positions
Preceded by Regina Minudri	President of the American Library Association; 1987–1988	Succeeded by F. William Summers
