= Yesterday's Wife =

1923 film

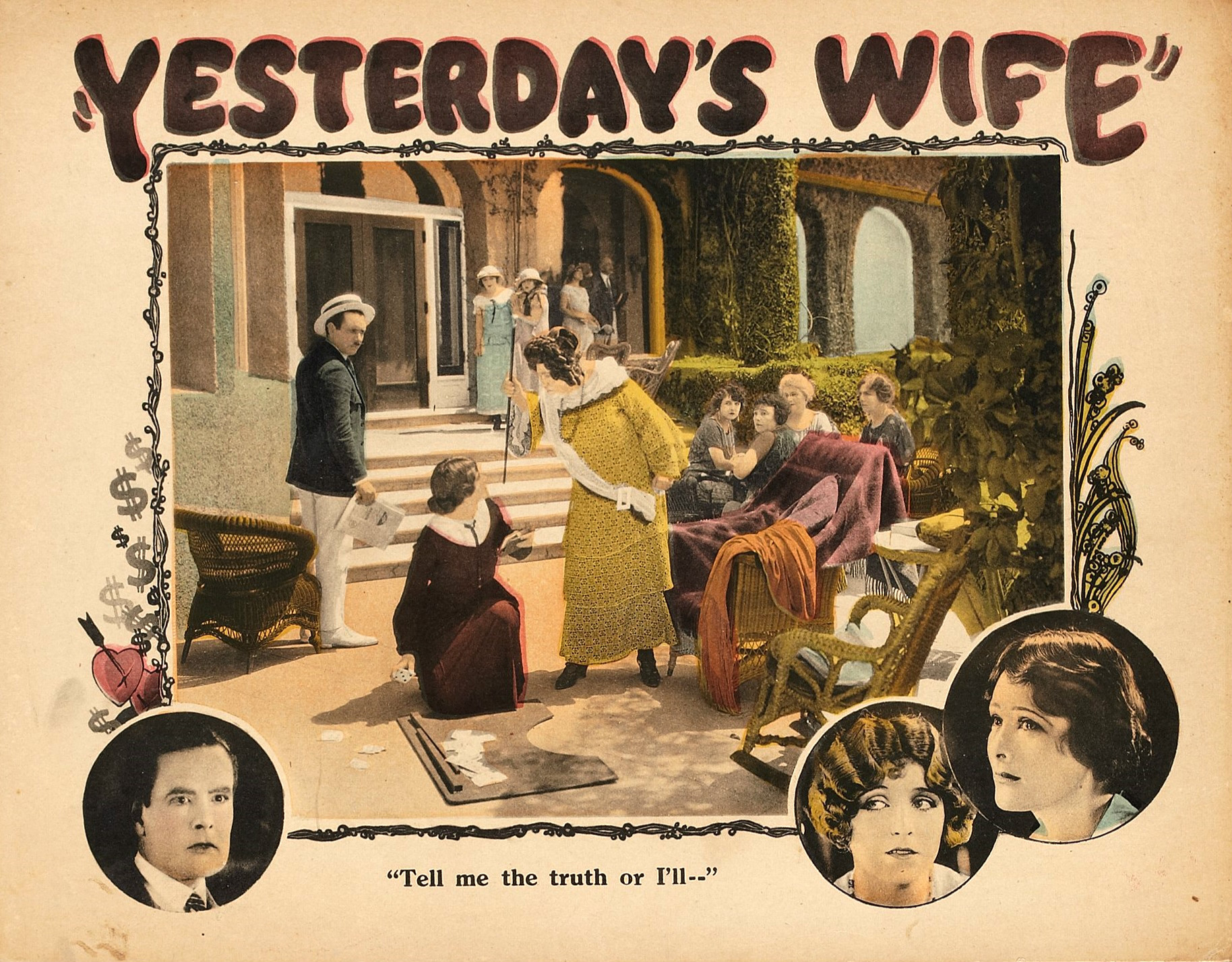
- Directed by: Edward LeSaint
- Written by: Evelyn Campbell
- Produced by: Harry Cohn
- Starring: Irene Rich; Eileen Percy; Lottie Williams
- Cinematography: King D. Gray
- Production company: CBC Film Sales Corporation
- Distributed by: CBC Film Sales Corporation
- Release date: August 15, 1923
- Running time: 56 minutes
- Country: United States
- Language: Silent (English intertitles)

Yesterday's Wife is a lost 1923 American silent comedy-drama film directed by Edward LeSaint and starring Irene Rich, Eileen Percy, and Lottie Williams. The film was released by the CBC Film Sales Corporation, which would later become Columbia Pictures.

== Plot ==
As described in a film magazine review, following a mutual misunderstanding, a divorce decree parts Gilbert and Megan Armes. She becomes a companion to an old lady while Gilbert weds Viola, who is frivolous and a flirt. Megan and her former husband meet years later at a fashionable resort and find that they are still in love with each other. Viola is drowned in a boating accident. Megan and Gilbert remarry.

== Cast ==
- Irene Rich as Megan Daye
- Eileen Percy as Viola Armes
- Lottie Williams as Sophia
- Josephine Crowell as Mrs. Harbours
- Lewis Dayton as Gilbert Armes
- Philo McCullough as Victor Fleming
- William Scott as Jeo Coombs

== Bibliography ==
- Munden, Kenneth White. The American Film Institute Catalog of Motion Pictures Produced in the United States, Part 1. University of California Press, 1997.
