= List of crime films of 1999 =

This is a list of crime films released in 1999.

Title	Director	Cast	Country	Notes
Analyze This	Harold Ramis	Robert De Niro, Billy Crystal, Lisa Kudrow, Chazz Palminteri	United States	Crime comedy
Bangkok Dangerous	Danny Pang, Oxide Pang Chun	Pawalit Mongkolpisit	Thailand	
Best Laid Plans	Mike Barker	Reese Witherspoon, Alessandro Nivola, Josh Brolin, Father Terrance Sweeney, Rebecca Klingler	United States	
Bobby G. Can't Swim	John-Luke Montias	John-Luke Montias, Susan Mitchell, Vincent Vega	United States	
The Boondock Saints	Troy Duffy	Willem Dafoe, Sean Patrick Flanery, Norman Reedus	United States	
Cement	Adrian Pasdar	Henry Czerny, Anthony de Sando	United States	Crime thriller
Au Coeur du Mensonge	Claude Chabrol	Sandrine Bonnaire, Jacques Gamblin, Valeria Bruni-Tedeschi	France	Crime drama
Criminal Lovers	François Ozon	Natacha Régnier, Jérémie Renier, Miki Manojlovic	France	
Entrapment	Jon Amiel	Sean Connery, Catherine Zeta-Jones, Ving Rhames, Will Patton	United States	
Following	Christopher Nolan	Jeremy Theobald, John Nolan, Lucy Russell, Alex Haw	United Kingdom	Crime thriller
Freeway II: Confessions of a Trickbaby	Matthew Bright	Natasha Lyonne, Maria Celedonio, Vincent Gallo	United States	
From Dusk Till Dawn 2: Texas Blood Money	Scott Spiegel	Muse Watson, Tiffani-Amber Thiessen	United States	Crime thriller
Ghost Dog: The Way of the Samurai	Jim Jarmusch	Forest Whitaker, John Tormey	United States; France	
Gloria	Sidney Lumet	Sharon Stone, Jean-Luke Figueroa, Jeremy Northam, Bonnie Bedelia, George C. Scott	United States	
Go	Doug Liman	Sarah Polley, Desmond Askew, Katie Holmes, Timothy Olyphant, Scott Wolf, Taye Diggs, William Fichtner	United States	Crime comedy
The Green Mile	Frank Darabont	Tom Hanks, Michael Clarke Duncan	United States	Prison film
Humanité	Bruno Dumont	Emmanuel Schotté, Séverine Caneele, Philippe Tullier	France	Crime drama
In Too Deep	Michael Rymer	Omar Epps, LL Cool J, Nia Long	United States	Gangster film
Kiss Toledo Goodbye	Lyndon Chubbuck	Michael Rapaport, Christopher Walken, Robert Forster	United States	
The Limey	Steven Soderbergh	Terence Stamp, Peter Fonda, Lesley Ann Warren	United States	
Resurrection	Russell Mulcahy	Christopher Lambert, Leland Orser, Robert Joy	United States	
Running Out of Time	Johnnie To	Andy Lau, Lau Ching-Wan, Hui Shiu Hung, Lam Suet	Hong Kong	Crime thriller
The Mission	Johnnie To, Law Wing-cheung	Anthony Wong, Francis Ng, Jacky Lui	Hong Kong	
Payback	Brian Helgeland	Mel Gibson, Gregg Henry, Maria Bello, Deborah Kara Unger, David Paymer, Lucy Liu, Kris Kristofferson	United States	Crime thriller
Summer of Sam	Spike Lee	John Leguizamo, Adrien Brody, Mira Sorvino	United States	Crime drama
The Talented Mr. Ripley	Anthony Minghella	Matt Damon, Gwyneth Paltrow, Jude Law, Cate Blanchett	United States	Crime thriller
The Tricky Master	Wong Jing	Nick Cheung, Suki Kwan, Stephen Chow	Hong Kong	Crime comedy
