= Adele Balkan =

American costume designer (1907–1999)

- Born: August 27, 1907; Berkeley, California
- Died: November 20, 1999 (aged 92)
- Occupation: costume designer

Adele Balkan (August 27, 1907 – November 20, 1999) was an American costume designer whose career spanned 40 years working on motion pictures during Hollywood's Golden Age of Classical cinema. Her credits for Paramount, Universal Studios, RKO, and 20th Century Fox include work on “Mighty Joe Young,” “The Blue Angel” (with May Britt), and The Fly.

Balkan began her career in 1932 as a sketch artist on Cecil B. DeMille's Cleopatra. Much of Balkan's subsequent work was as a sketch artist assisting chief designers such as Edith Head, Travis Banton, Marjorie Best, Howard Greer, Irene, Charles LeMaire, Vittorio Nino Novarese, Renié, and Edward Stevenson.

In an interview, Balkan described the role of the sketch artist and the potential for the relationship between the illustrator and designer. "The sketch artist was, primarily and solely, to sketch the design that the designer gave them. The designer created, and the sketcher illustrated. If the sketch artist knew how to create something, and if the designer was fond of that person, they'd kind of work together sometimes, and it gave the sketch artist a chance to create, and it gave the designer another pocket to take from. And they did it, and I mean, it was understood, nobody got excited about it."

The Academy of Motion Picture Arts and Sciences interviewed Balkan shortly before her death in 1999. In this transcript, she discusses the suggestion, made by Edith Head, to make the costume sketch in the shape and proportions of the actress who would wear the garment. "That was very bad. They came out thick and short.... They had no sweep, they had no movement. You have to exaggerate. You have to really make a sketch that everybody's excited about. The producer, the director, the star. And then you have to work to make her look like that."

== Early life and education ==
Balkan was born in Berkeley, California, in 1907, and lived in Berkeley and San Francisco, California, until the age of 10, when her father, a traveling salesman, moved the family to Boston, Massachusetts, and New York City, New York. Later, the family resettled on the West Coast. A dancer as a child, she studied with Ruth St. Denis and Ted Shawn at Denishawn and auditioned for Ziegfeld and George White's Scandals. She entered art school after graduating from Berkeley High School, eventually graduating from Cooper Union. After moving to Los Angeles in 1934, Balkan sought a job at Paramount. "I wanted to be [at Paramount], because I had seen Travis Banton's name on the screen for credit for the costumes, in the movies, and I loved his work. I didn't realize at the time that he was the finest designer that the business has ever had. I only know I knew that I liked his things and I wanted to work at Paramount. So I took my little portfolio and I went out there."

== Filmography ==
(as costume designer)
1965 John Goldfarb, Please Come Home!
1960 Flaming Star
1959 The Blue Angel
1959 A Private's Affair
1959 Blue Denim
1958 The Fiend Who Walked the West
1958 The Fly
1958 From Hell to Texas
1958 The Young Lions
1957 The Way to the Gold
1956 Three Brave Men
1955 Seven Cities of Gold
1952 The Narrow Margin (uncredited)
1951 Two Tickets to Broadway (uncredited)
1949 Mighty Joe Young (costumes)
1948 The Boy with Green Hair (gowns)
1948 Bodyguard
1948 They Live by Night (uncredited)
1948 The Arizona Ranger (uncredited)
1948 Fighting Father Dunne
1947 Trail Street (gowns)
1946 Criminal Court (uncredited)
1946 Riverboat Rhythm (uncredited)

== Exhibitions ==
After retiring from the film industry, Balkan became a full-time artist and exhibited her costume sketches at the L.A. County Museum of Art and Academy of Motion Picture Arts & Sciences.
