= The Library Corporation =

Library software company

- Type: Private
- Industry: Software
- Headquarters: Inwood, West Virginia, United States
- Area served: International
- Key people: Annette Harwood Murphy (co-founder, President/CEO) John Burns (Senior Vice President, Chief Operating Officer) Justin Duewel-Zahniser (Chief Technology Officer) Brad Murphy (Vice President, Singapore Operations) Calvin Whittington (Director of Finance and Administration) Sam Brenizer (Director of Data Services) Ebony Pacheco-Hoos (Director of Product) Rhia Stark (Director of Marketing) Sherry Banks (Director of Operations) Lonnie Thomas (Director of IT) Jen Watson (Director of Client Services) Justin Larsen (Director of Brand Assets)
- Products: Integrated library systems, OPACs, library circulation software, library cataloging software, MARC records, library acquisitions software
- Website: TLCdelivers.com

The Library Corporation (TLC) creates and distributes automation and cataloging software to public, school, academic, and special library systems worldwide. Based in Inwood, West Virginia, with additional offices in Denver, Singapore, and Ontario, the company is owned and operated by the same family who established it in 1974.

In 1985, it became the first organization in the world to successfully use CD-ROM technology for data storage when it released its BiblioFile Cataloging software. The CD-ROM drive used to read those first commercially produced discs, as well as the original BiblioFile Cataloging CD-ROMs, are now in the Smithsonian Institution.

TLC, a GSA-certified company, earned a 2009 Best in Tech Award from Scholastic Administrator magazine. Also in 2009, its senior product developer, Matt Moran, was named by Library Journal magazine as one of the library industry's top 51 "Movers and Shakers."

== Library automation systems ==
The company offers three integrated library systems: Library•Solution for public, academic, and special libraries; Library•Solution for Schools for public and private school libraries; and CARL•X, the next-generation version of the legacy CARL•Solution automation system.

Each system automates the standard operations of a library, including the check-in/check-out process, cataloging, inventory, authority control, reports, and management of floating collections. Facilities that utilize a TLC ILS include the Los Angeles Public Library in California, Dallas Independent School District in Texas, Ministry of Home Affairs in Singapore, Anchorage School District in Alaska, and Chicago Public Schools in Illinois.

== Online public access catalog products ==
TLC adds Web-based, touchscreen-optimized functionality to its ILS products with a series of software patches referred to as the LS2 suite of OPACs: LS2 PAC, LS2 Kids, and LS2 Staff.

- LS2 PAC works with all three of TLC's automation systems to give patrons online access to library catalogs, including downloadable e-books, audiobooks, and other digital resources. It includes a customizable display of library titles, RSS news and information feeds, Google Analytics™ integration, federated searching of in-house and online content, integrated searching of subscription databases, list creation and sharing capabilities, and patron ratings, reviews, and search tags.
- LS2 Kids is the children's version of LS2 PAC, designed to enable young readers to independently explore a library's online catalog. It includes quick links to popular book series, interactive title displays with enlarged book jackets, a search box that provides spelling suggestions and corrections, and a category wheel with icons that link to appropriate titles.
- LS2 Staff allows libraries to perform basic circulation functions from any computer with Internet access.

== Library automation enhancements ==
The company also created standalone cataloging and acquisitions products that work with any ILS.

- eBiblioFile is a cataloging service that offers complete MARC records for e-books and other digital materials.
- RDAExpress is a catalog conversion service for eBiblioFile users that upgrades a library's MARC records to the new Resource Description and Access (RDA) standard.
- BiblioFile is a cataloging program from the 1970s that accesses and processes MARC records for printed library materials from online databases.
- ITS•MARC offers Z39.50 and Internet access to MARC records. The metadata is processed by cataloging programs like BiblioFile.

Additionally, TLC is the exclusive distributor of SocialFlow to the library marketplace. SocialFlow is a social media optimization tool that uses algorithms and key metrics to determine the best time to publish content for the widest possible audience.

== See also ==
Libraries that have implemented TLC's automation products have been featured in media reports including:

- CBC Radio, "Sault Public Library launches new computer service" (Jan. 9, 2012)
- WALA Fox 10 TV, "Libraries going mobile" (Dec. 13, 2011)
- Government Technology, "Smartphones Replacing Old-Fashioned Library Cards" (Aug. 3, 2011)
- The Wright County Monitor, "TLC system grows as more libraries join BEACON consortium" (Jan. 6, 2011)
- Daily Mountain Eagle, "Library gets smart-phone application" (Nov. 28, 2010)
- The Des Moines Register, "Council approves purchase of library data management system" (Nov. 1, 2010)
- Independent Tribune, "Concord library to get major renovation" (Oct. 1, 2010)
- Contra Costa Times, "Library streamlines online access" (March 17, 2010)
- Elbert County News, "Library announces software update" (Nov. 3, 2009)
- The Winsted Journal, "$35,000 grant helps modernize Beardsley and Memorial Library" (Aug. 21, 2009)
