= List of Marathi films of 1999 =

The following films were produced by the Marathi-language film industry based in Maharashtra in the year 1999.

== 1999 Releases ==
A list of Marathi films released in 1999.

Year	Film	Director	Cast	Release Date	Producer	Notes	Source
1999
1999	Gharabaher	Sanjay Surkar	Sonali Kulkarni, Sachin Khedekar, Mohan Joshi, Reema Lagoo	27 October 1999 (India)	Everest Entertainment	National Film Award for Best Feature Film in Marathi in 1999	
1999	Bindhaast	Chandrakant Kulkarni	Gautami Gadgil, Sharvari Jamenis, Reema Lagoo				
1999	Kairee	Amol Palekar	Yogita Deshmukh, Shilpa Navalkar, Mohan Gokhale, Atul Kulkarni	29 September 2000 (India)	Ministry of Health and Family Welfare (India)		
1999	Aai Thor Tujhe Upkar	Prakash Bhende	Laxmikant Berde, Uma Bhende, Mohan Joshi	15 November 1999 (India)	Everest Entertainment		
1999	Nirmala Machindra Kamble	Chandrakant Joshi	Sulabha Deshpande, Sameer Dharmadhikari		Prerna Chitre		
1999	Pathrakhin	Ganesh Jadhav	Nishigandha Wad; Deepak Deulkar; Ashok Shinde	31 December 1999	Ganesh Jadhav; Afjalbhai Baghban		
1999	Ratra Aarambh	Ajay Phansekar	Dilip Prabhavalkar, Deepak Shirke, Dilip Kulkarni, Anand Abhyankar		Laxmi Venkatesh Films		
