= Dojnice =

Dojnicë: Dojnicë (Albanian); Дoјнице/Dojnice (Serbian)
- Village
- Location in Kosovo
- Coordinates: 42°13′14″N 20°48′6″E
- Location: Kosovo
- District: Prizren
- Municipality: Prizren

Population (2024)
  - Total: 0
- Time zone: CET (UTC+01:00); CEST (UTC+2)

Dojnica (or Dojnicë, serbian: Дoјнице/Dojnice) is an abandoned village in the Prizren Municipality of Kosovo.

== Population ==
Development
Year	Population
1948	219
1953	231
1961	226
1971	218
1981	174
1991	90
2011	0

In 2024 Dojnica had no Inhabitants.
