= Calling All Husbands =

1940 film by Noel M. Smith

- Theatrical release poster
- Directed by: Noel M. Smith
- Screenplay by: Robert E. Kent
- Based on: Broken Dishes; 1929 play by Martin Flavin
- Produced by: William Jacobs
- Starring: George Tobias; Lucile Fairbanks; Ernest Truex; George Reeves; Florence Bates; Charles Halton
- Cinematography: Ted D. McCord
- Edited by: Frank Magee
- Music by: Howard Jackson
- Production company: Warner Bros. Pictures
- Distributed by: Warner Bros. Pictures
- Release date: September 7, 1940
- Running time: 79 minutes
- Country: United States
- Language: English

Calling All Husbands is a 1940 American comedy film directed by Noel M. Smith and written by Robert E. Kent and based on Martin Flavin's 1929 play "Broken Dishes". The film stars George Tobias, Lucile Fairbanks, Ernest Truex, George Reeves, Florence Bates and Charles Halton. The film was released by Warner Bros. Pictures on September 7, 1940.

== Cast ==
- George Tobias as Oscar Armstrong
- Lucile Fairbanks as Bette Trippe
- Ernest Truex as Homer Trippe
- George Reeves as Dan Williams
- Florence Bates as Emmie Trippe
- Charles Halton as Hadley Weaver
- Virginia Sale as Mabel Parker
- John Alexander as Sheriff Ben Bar
- Clem Bevans as Judge Todd
- Sam McDaniel as Nappy
- Elliott Sullivan as Chunky
