= Leszek Molenda =

Polish volleyball player (1953–1999)

Personal information
- Nationality: Polish
- Born: 23 July 1953; Sosnowiec, Poland
- Died: 15 June 1999 (aged 45); Sosnowiec, Poland

Sport
- Sport: Volleyball

Leszek Molenda (23 July 1953 – 15 June 1999) was a Polish volleyball player. He competed in the men's tournament at the 1980 Summer Olympics.
