= Eulalie Minfred Banks =

American illustrator

- Born: June 12, 1895; London, England
- Died: November 12, 1999 (aged 104); Sherman Oaks, California
- Known for: Illustration
- Spouse: Arthur Wilson (m. 1916) ending in divorce

Eulalie Minfred Banks (12 June 1895 – 12 November 1999) was a British illustrator of children's books, illustrating over 50 children's books.

== Biography ==
Born in a southeastern suburb of London, England, she started her career in drawing at the age of 12 designing Christmas cards. In 1913 Banks published her first picture book, Bobby in Bubbleland.

In 1916 Banks married Arthur Wilson. In 1918 the couple emigrated to Canada and then moved to the United States.

In the United States, Banks had a working relationship with the publisher Platt and Munk. She illustrated many classic children's books including nursery rhymes, fairy tales and folk stories. These books remained in print for years.

In 1937 Banks was divorced and returned to the United Kingdom. In 1948 she exhibited at the British Industries Fair.

After her move in later years to Southern California, she also became known for creating murals in various buildings, both private and public, in the Los Angeles area. Her work included a mural at the Santa Monica Public Library, which has since been razed.

Banks died on 12 November 1999 in Sherman Oaks, California at the age of 104.
