= Heinz Schmitz =

German field hockey player

Karl Heinz Schmidt (24 April 1928 – 8 November 1999) was a German field hockey player who competed in the 1952 Summer Olympics.

Schmidt was born in Mülheim an der Ruhr and died in Günzburg.
