= Mauricio de la Lama =

Mexican sailor (1919–1999)

Personal information
- Born: 1 December 1919; Mexico City, Mexico
- Died: 14 June 1999 (aged 79)

Sport
- Sport: Sailing

Mauricio de la Lama (11 December 1919 – 14 June 1999) was a Mexican sailor, who competed in the 1960 Summer Olympics and the 1964 Summer Olympics.
