= A Fugitive from Justice =

- Directed by: Terry O. Morse
- Written by: Leonard Neubauer (story "Million Dollar Fugitive")
- Starring: Roger Pryor; Lucile Fairbanks; Eddie Foy Jr.
- Cinematography: Arthur L. Todd
- Edited by: Thomas Pratt
- Production company: Warner Bros. Pictures, Inc.
- Release date: June 15, 1940
- Running time: 53 minutes
- Country: United States
- Language: English

A Fugitive from Justice is a 1940 crime film starring Roger Pryor, Lucile Fairbanks and Eddie Foy Jr.

== Plot ==
Fugitive Lee Leslie (Donald Douglas) is wanted by three groups; the police, the gangsters who fear his testimony in court and the insurance company that carries a $1,000,000 policy on him and is anxious to protect its interests by seeing that Leslie stays alive. The company assigns Dan Miller (Pryor) and his partner, Ziggy, (Foy) to find Leslie. A night club singer, Ruby Patterson (Sheila Bromley) the beneficiary of his will, tips the gangsters as to his whereabouts. He escapes but the gang kidnaps his sister Janet (Fairbanks) and his mother (Lottie Williams). His plan to surrender to the police now depends on being able to rescue them first.
