= Duhël =

Duhël: Duhël (Albanian); Дуље/Dulje (Serbian)
- Village
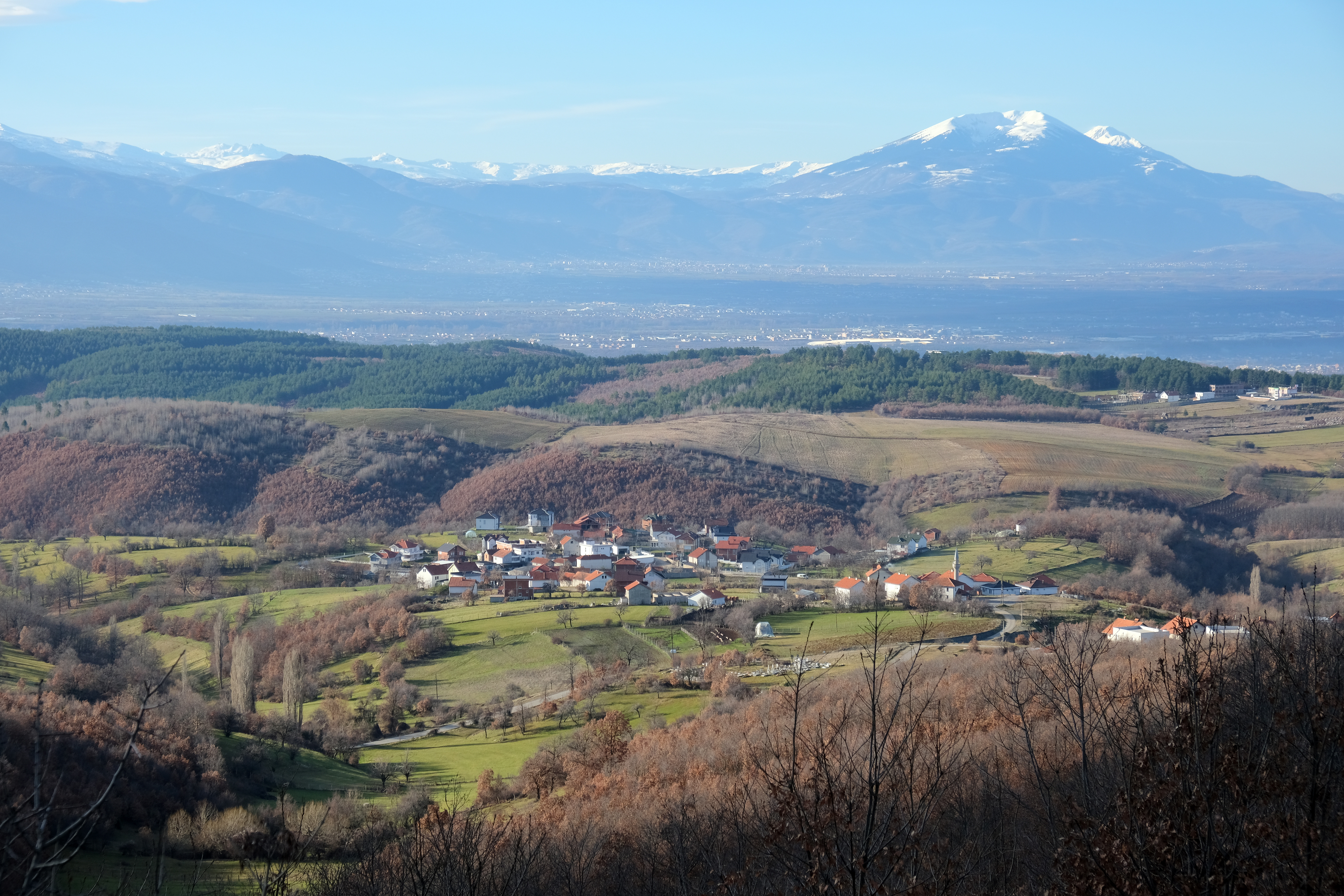

- Location in Kosovo
- Coordinates: 42°24′33″N 20°52′22″E
- Country: Kosovo
- District: Prizren
- Municipality: Suharekë
- First mention: 1348

Area
  - Total: 54.6 sq mi (141.3 km^{2})
- Elevation: 2,106 ft (642 m)

Population (2024)
  - Total: 1,020
- Time zone: UTC+1 (CET)
  - Summer (DST): UTC+2 (CEST)
- Area code: +381 290
- Car plates: 04

Duhël (Serbian Cyrillic: Дуље, Albanian: Duhël/Duhla) is a settlement in the Suva Reka municipality in Kosovo. The village is exclusively ethnic Albanian; in the 2024 census, it had 1,020 inhabitants.

== Geography ==
The village lies in Prizrenski Podgor, about 25 km east of Prizren, on the west side of the Carralevë and offset of the Šar Mountains. It lies in the region of Podrimlje. From its heights, one can view almost the whole of Metohija. Duhël extends over a lake terrace, nearly 1 km wide, around 750 m high, which in this part represents the border of the Metohija-Prizren region. The rural settlement lies on a cadastral area of 1413 hectares. Duhël includes two major physiognomic parts: Duhël, the main part with three mahala (hamlets); Rrafsh, Srpska (Mahalla e serbëve) and Sopska; the second part is Dragaçin, an isolated hamlet on the right valley side of the Dragaçinn river. The Suhareka-Duhël-Malishevë road goes through the village.

Duhla was formerly a seat of a municipality with the same name, though it still represents an administrative and cultural center for the neighbouring villages.

== History ==
The village is mentioned for the first time in the Saint Archangels charter (Svetoarhanđelska povelja) of Emperor Stephen Uroš IV Dušan, dating to 1348, as Duhlje. A medieval road crossed Duhël, from Prizren to Shtime, further to the interior of Serbia. There are ruins of the medieval Serbian Orthodox Churches of Parascheva (Sv. Petka), on a graveyard, and the Holy Salvation (Sv. Spasa), by the spring of the Lukara stream, in the village.

In 1881, when Dervish-Pasha crushed the rebel Albanians in Ferizovik, he hung Albanian Sefë Koshari to a pear tree between Ferizovići and Shtime. Some of the Albanians sought rest in Duhla Hana, after their defeat. When the innkeeper burnt trees in the furnace, the Albanians woke up in fear; they thought Dervish-Pasha had come after them shooting guns, after which they fled.

During the Serbian Campaign (World War I), in 1915, after the Bulgarian breakthrough of Serbian positions, the last Serbian contingents in Kosovo had divisions in Carralevë; the Cavalry Division had retreated to the Duhla Hana.

During the Kosovo War, the Kosovo Liberation Army (KLA) operated in the region and the area experienced bombings by NATO forces. KLA forces were reported to have killed and wounded several Serbian policemen and civilians.

=== Demographic history ===
The village was historically inhabited by Serbs, and the Albanian families came from Malësia in northern Albania, most likely in the 18th century. According to data which is older than the 18th century from the Devič monastery, all villages of Drenica were inhabited by Serbs. In 1875, there were 26 Albanian and 4 Serb families in the village. In 1879, there were 16 Albanian and 4 Serb families in the village. In 1910, there were 6 Serb families (no data on Albanians). In 1921, there were 52 houses and 299 inhabitants.

Population counts in censuses conducted between 1948 and 1991 are provided in the table below. Information on population by ethnic group is not available for most years in this period. In 1981, 1229 people were listed as Albanian and 1 person was listed as Muslim; no residents were identified as Serbs, Montenegrins, Turks, or other groups.

Population history
	1948	1953	1961	1971	1981	1991
Population count	564	649	722	881	1230	1399
