= Bobby G. Can't Swim =

1999 film

- Directed by: John-Luke Mounties
- Written by: John-Luke Montias
- Produced by: Michael Pilgram
- Starring: John-Luke Montias
- Edited by: Michael Pilgram
- Production company: CineBlast!
- Release date: 1999
- Running time: 89 minutes
- Country: United States
- Language: English
- Budget: $20,000 (est.)

Bobby G. Can't Swim is a 1999 crime drama film directed by, written by, and starring John-Luke Montias. It is the story of a small time drug-dealer in New York City.

== Synopsis ==
Bobby G is a small-time coke dealer in Hell's Kitchen, New York City. His day-to-day life consists of casual encounters with neighborhood characters: his Puerto Rican prostitute girlfriend, Lucy; a blind man who sells found objects on the street; and Bobby's high-strung supplier who goes by the name of Coco. Two local undercover cops are working on arresting Bobby for his low-level drug dealing.

When a rich yuppie approaches Bobby looking to buy a kilo of coke, Bobby sees a chance to make a big score and retire from the drug business. He convinces a high-level fearsome drug dealer to give him the coke without payment up front, but then the deal falls apart and Bobby loses the drugs attempting to evade the undercover cops. His life descends into a downward spiral as he tries to find a way out of the dire situation he finds himself in.

== Production ==
Director John-Luke Montias wrote the script while working as a bartender in Hell's Kitchen, basing much of it on "crazy stories" he would hear from his customers. He shot the film in 18 days on a budget of just over $20,000. Montias raised most of the money from friends and his regular customers at the bar where he worked.

== Reception ==
Rotten Tomatoes gives the film a 70% rating. Variety described the film as, "gutsy, unconventional, bursting with raw urban energy". The film won both the "Best New Director" award and the "New Directions" award at the 1999 AFI International Film Festival.
