= America's Public Television Stations =

Public television advocacy organization

- Formation: Tax-exempt since July 1980; 45 years ago
- Type: 501(c)(3)
- Tax ID no.: EIN: 521170071
- Headquarters: Arlington, Virginia
- Revenue: 4,552,247 USD (2024)
- Expenses: 4,946,561 USD (2024)
- Website: apts.org

APTS Action Inc
- Formation: Tax-exempt since March 2002; 23 years ago
- Type: 501(c)(4)
- Headquarters: Arlington, Virginia
- Revenue: 1,780,979 USD (2024)
- Expenses: 1,614,885 USD (2024)

America's Public Television Stations (APTS) is a non-profit membership organization established in 1979 when the Public Broadcasting Service (PBS) board of directors commissioned the public television "system planning project" to consider the most appropriate organization of national service functions for public television for the 1980s. Its major role is representing America's 170 public television licensees in federal legislative, regulatory, and related matters in Washington, DC.
