= Passage from Hong Kong =

1941 film

- Theatrical release poster
- Directed by: D. Ross Lederman
- Written by: Fred Niblo Jr. Earl Derr Biggers
- Produced by: William Jacobs
- Starring: Lucile Fairbanks; Douglas Kennedy; Paul Cavanagh; Richard Ainley; Marjorie Gateson; Gloria Holden
- Cinematography: Allen G. Siegler
- Edited by: Frederick Richards
- Music by: William Lava
- Production company: Warner Bros. Pictures
- Distributed by: Warner Bros. Pictures
- Release date: September 1941
- Running time: 61 minutes
- Country: United States
- Language: English

Passage from Hong Kong is a 1941 American comedy mystery film directed by D. Ross Lederman and written by Fred Niblo Jr. and Earl Derr Biggers. The film stars Lucile Fairbanks, Douglas Kennedy, Paul Cavanagh, Richard Ainley, Marjorie Gateson and Gloria Holden. The film was released by Warner Bros. Pictures in September 1941.

== Cast ==
- Lucile Fairbanks as Marcia Calhoun
- Douglas Kennedy as Jeff Hunter
- Paul Cavanagh as Capt. Duncan MacNeil-Fraser
- Richard Ainley as Lt. Norman MacNeil-Fraser
- Marjorie Gateson as Aunt Julia
- Gloria Holden as Madame Wrangell
- Lumsden Hare as Inspector Bray
- Tom Stevenson as Andrew
- Boyd Irwin as Beattie
- Chester Gan as Chung
- Joan Winfield as Steamship Clerk (uncredited)
