= Lucile Fairbanks =

American actress

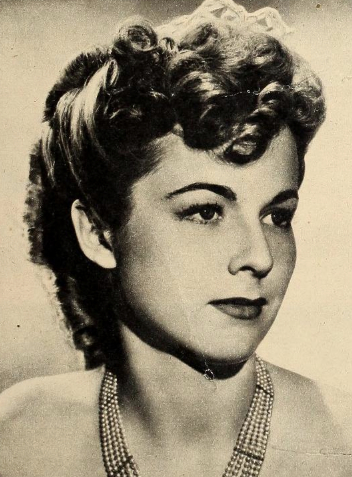
- pictured in 1940
- Born: October 18, 1917; Los Angeles, California, US
- Died: November 14, 1999 (aged 82); Los Angeles, California, US
- Other name: Lucile Fairbanks Crump
- Occupation: Actress
- Years active: 1939-1942 (film)
- Spouse: Owen Crump (m. 1942; died 1998)

Lucile Fairbanks (1917–1999) was an American actress who appeared in 11 movies from 1939 to 1942, playing a lead role in A Fugitive from Justice (1940) and Passage from Hong Kong (1941).

== Personal ==
She was the niece of Douglas Fairbanks. She was married to Hollywood writer-director Owen Crump.

== Filmography ==
Year	Title	Role	Notes
1939	We Are Not Alone		uncredited
1940	Saturday's Children	1st Nurse at the Greenwich Clinic	Uncredited
1940	Flight Angels	Thelma	
1940	A Fugitive from Justice	Janet Leslie	
1940	Money and the Woman	Miss Carlson	uncredited
1940	Calling All Husbands	Bette Trippe	
1940	Knute Rockne, All American	Telephone Operator	uncredited
1941	The Strawberry Blonde	Harold's girlfriend	
1941	Passage from Hong Kong	Marcia Calhoun	
1942	The Man Who Returned to Life	Jane Meadows Bishop	
1942	Klondike Fury	Peg Campbell	
