= Mandić =

- Language: Serbo-Croatian

Origin
- Meaning: matronymic from Manda
- Region of origin: Bosnia and Herzegovina, Croatia, Serbia

Other names
- Variant form: Mandušić

Mandić (Serbian Cyrillic: Мандић) is a Serbo-Croatian surname, a matronymic of the feminine given name Manda, a hypocorism of Mandalena, a variant of Magdalena imported from Italian.

Notable people with the name include:

- Aleksandar Mandić (born 1988), Serbian politician
- Andrija Mandić (born 1965), Montenegrin Serb politician
- Ante Mandić (1881–1959), Croatian and Yugoslavian politician and lawyer
- Danilo Mandic, English engineer
- Danko Mandić (born 1957), Croatian sailor
- David Mandić (born 1997), Croatian handball player
- Dominik Mandić (1889–1973), Bosnian Croat Franciscan priest and supporter of the Ustaše movement
- Dušan Mandić (born 1994), Serbian water polo player
- Đuka Mandić (1822–1892), mother of Nikola Tesla
- Igor Mandić (1939–2022), Croatian writer and journalist
- Igor Mandić (handballer) (born 1991), Bosnian handball player
- John Mandic (1919–2003), American basketball player of Croatian origin
- Josip Mandić (1883–1959), Croatian lawyer and composer
- Lara Mandić (born 1974), Yugoslavian and Serbian former female basketball player
- Leopold Mandić (1866–1942), Croatian saint
- Marin Mandić (1826–2011), Catholic Salesian priest, writer and missionary in Mexico
- Marko Mandič (rower) (1939–1991), Croatian rower
- Marko Mandić (footballer) (1999), Serbian footballer
- Matko Mandić (1849–1915), Catholic priest and Croatian nationalist politician
- Milica Mandić (born 1991), Serbian taekwondo athlete and two-time Olympic champion
- Milorad Mandić (1961–2016), Serbian actor
- Momčilo Mandić (born 1954), Bosnian Serb political and business figure
- Nada Mandić (born 1969), Serbian politician
- Nikola Mandić (1869–1945), Croatian politician
- Nikola Mandić (footballer) (born 1995), Croatian footballer
- Nikolaj Mandić (1840–1907), Serbian theologian and Metropolitan
- Oliver Mandić (born 1953), Yugoslav and Serbian pop musician
- Pinar Karaca-Mandic, Turkish-American health economist
- Sanja Mandić (born 1995), Serbian basketball player
- Slavko Mandić (born 1972), Serbian-born Croatian footballer
- Staniša Mandić (born 1995), Montenegrin footballer
- Svetislav Mandić (1921–2003), Yugoslav and Serbian historian, copier, fresco conserver, poet and painter
- Veljko Mandić (1924–1988), Montenegrin actor
- Vladimir Mandić (born 1980), Serbian former handball player and businessman
- Vladimir Mandić (footballer) (born 1987) Slovenian footballer of Serbian descent
- Vuk Mandić (born 1975), Serbian-American astrophysicist
- Vukašin Mandić (born 1982), Serbian basketball player
- a brotherhood of the Maleševci tribe
