= Sredačka župa =

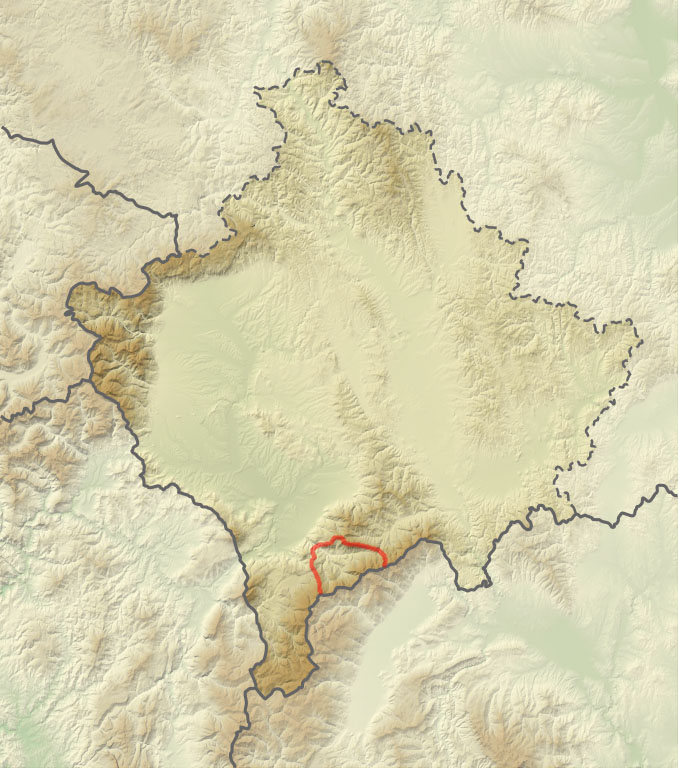
Location map in Kosovo

Srecka (Albanian: Sreckë) or Sredačka Župa (Serbian Cyrillic: Средачка Жупа, lit. 'County of Sredska') is a remote geographical region, a valley, in southeastern Kosovo, below the Šar Mountains at the source of the Prizren Bistrica.

== Geography ==
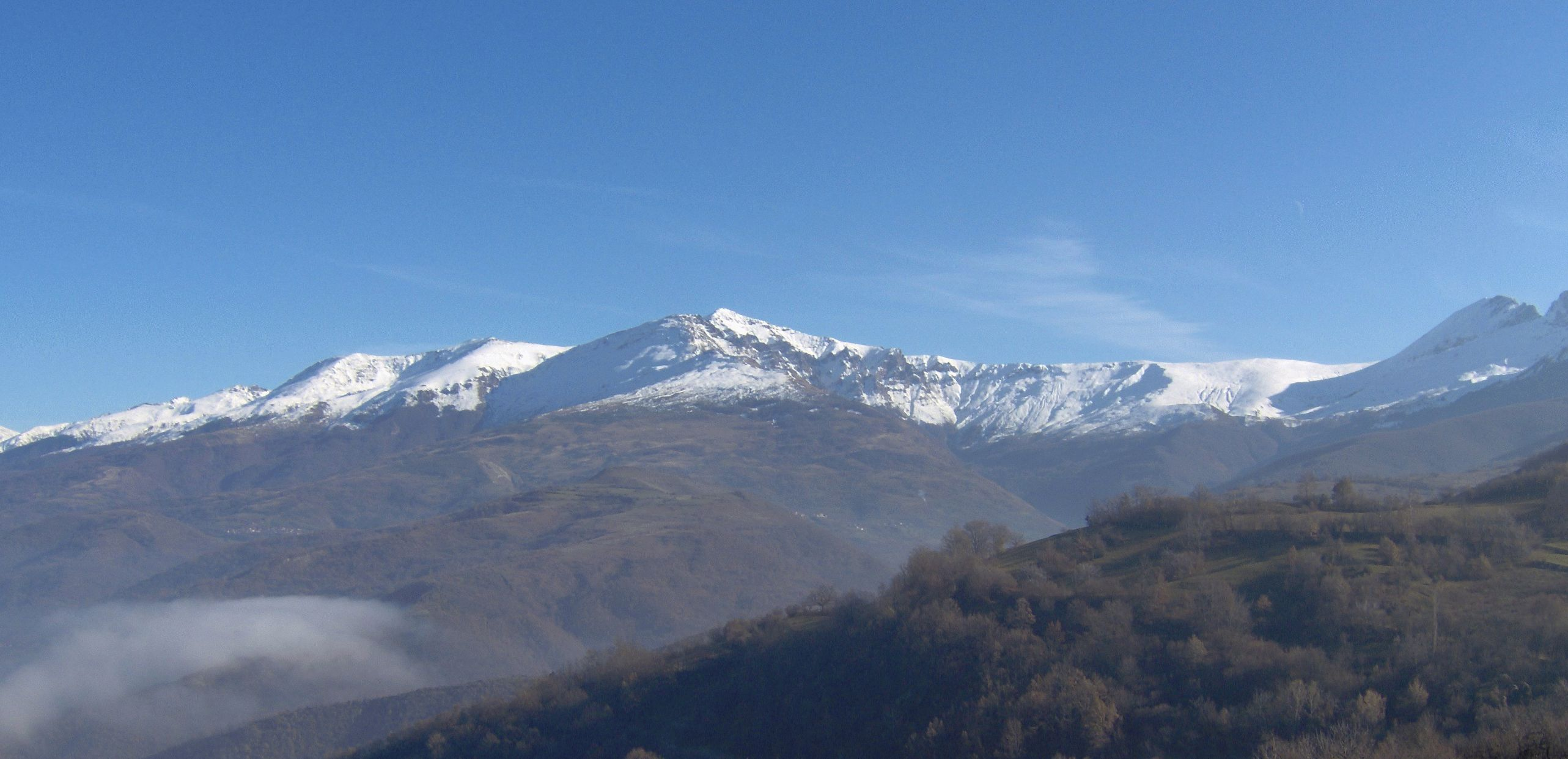
Maja e zezë (Crni Vrh) peak

The region, an oval basin, lies below the Šar Mountains, at the source, upper stream of the Prizren Bistrica. South of the region between the Prizren mountains and Koritnik mountain, lies the Gora region. It currently includes Sredska, Pousko, Jablanica, Lokvica, Rečane, Živinjane, Planjane, Nebregošte, Manastirica, Stružje, Donje Ljubinje, Gornje Ljubinje, Drajčići, Mušnikovo, Gornje Selo.

== History ==
It was a medieval župa (small administrative division) of the Serbia in the Middle Ages in modern-day southeastern Kosovo. It encompassed seven hamlets and was centered in the town of Sredska. In the early 19th century, Sredačka župa was inhabited by Serbs, and in the first decades Serbian schools were opened here.

Between 1918 and 1945 Sredačka župa was a municipality of the Kingdom of Yugoslavia. After World War II, in 1945, the Slavophone Muslims in Sredačka župa were ascribed Albanian ethnicity and names by state institutions (as was the case with Gorani and other Muslim non-Albanian speakers). The region was annexed into the municipality of Prizren by the FPR Yugoslavia (1945–63). In 1953, there were 12 villages in the region, and the region was inhabited by "Serbs [...] divided into Muslims and Orthodox" in all villages except Stružje (Struže) inhabited by Albanian Muslims.

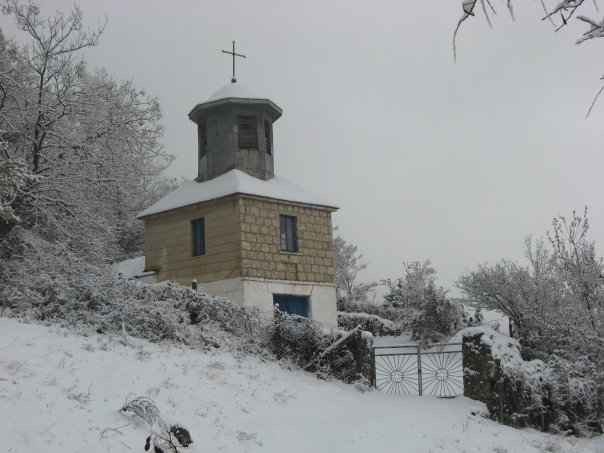
Church of the Holy Virgin, Sredska

== Demographics and anthropology ==
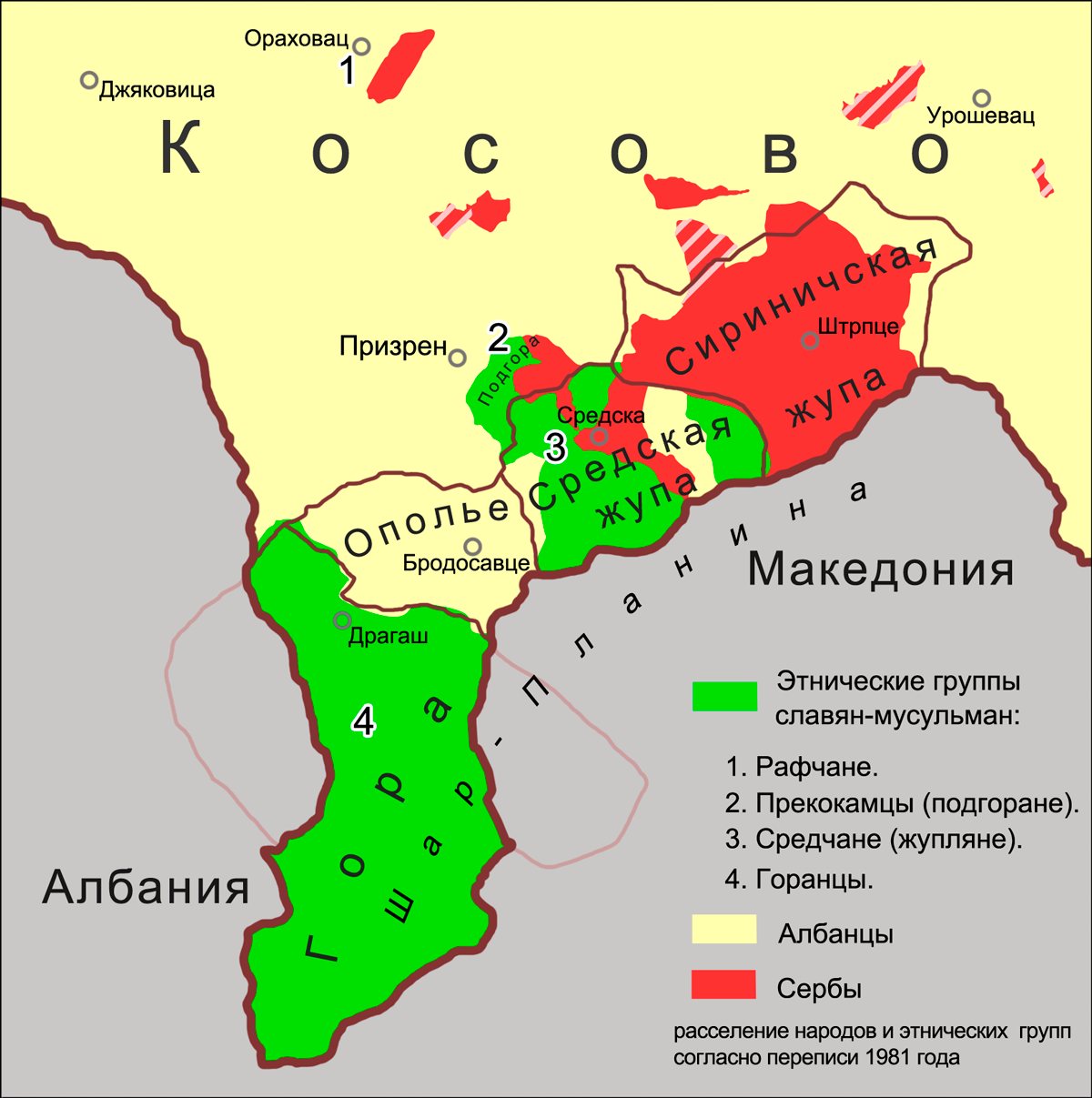
Ethnic groups in the Šar Mountain region, Kosovo, 1981 census (in Russian). Green—Muslims, Yellow—Albanians, Red—Serbs.

The region is inhabited by a majority of Bosniaks and minority of Serbs (who left during and following the Kosovo War.

== Notable people ==
- Vuk Isakovič (1696-1759), Austrian soldier
- Čolak-Anta (1777-1853), Serbian revolutionary
- Jake Allex (1887-1959), Serbian-American soldier

== Annotations ==
It is known in historiography as Sredačka Župa (Serbian Cyrillic: Средачка Жупа), Sredska Župa (Средска Жупа) and Sretečka Župa, meaning "County of Sredska")
