= Lovro Dobričević =

Dalmatian painter

Lovro Marinov Dobričević
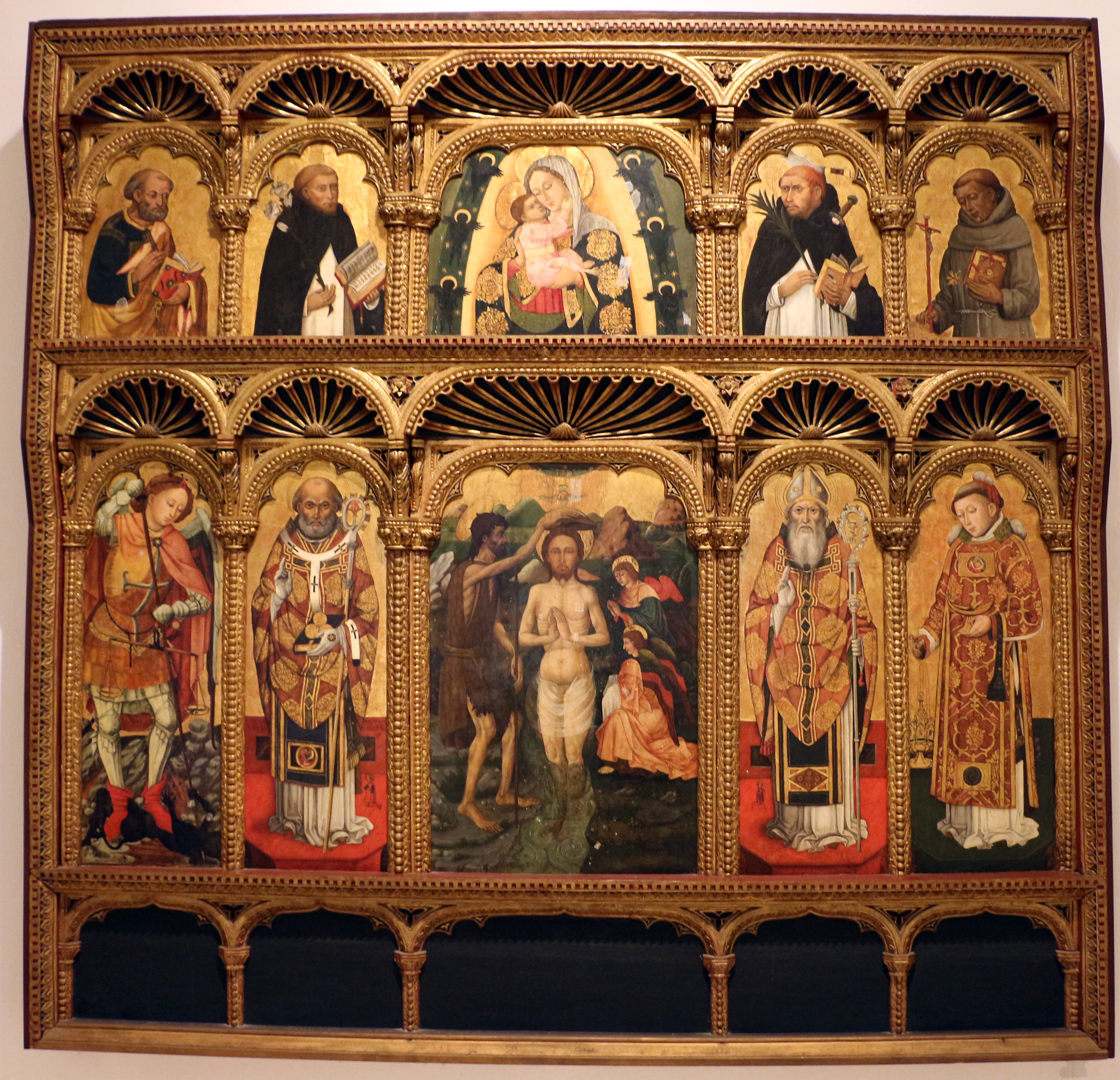
- Polyptych in Ragusa
- Born: Lorenzo Bon c. 1420; Cattaro, Republic of Venice
- Died: 1478; Ragusa, Republic of Ragusa
- Other name: Lorenzo di Marino da Cattaro
- Known for: Painting

Lovro Marinov Dobričević or Lorenzo Bon, Lorenzo di Marino da Cattaro (c. 1420 – 1478) was a Dalmatian painter from Venetian Dalmatia.

== Biography ==
Born in Cattaro, Republic of Venice (now Montenegro), he studied art in Venice before returning to Ragusa to work. He first started to paint in the Serbian Orthodox Savina Monastery in Zeta and Serbian Despotate (now Montenegro) in the mid-15th century. Also, his paintings may still be seen in both the Dominican and Franciscan monasteries in the city of Ragusa; one of his altarpieces may still be seen in a church in Slano.

Lorenzo Bon was born in Perzagno in 1419, as the oldest son in a bourgeois Cattaran family. His brother Marco stayed at the family estate in Perzagno and his other brother Leonardo became a goldsmith in Cattaro. When he was 12 years old, his father Marino put him in the service of the governor of Cattaro, Nicolò Pisano. In 1435, the 16 year old Lorenzo went to Venice as a servant of the Cattaran governor. It is assumed that he studied with the prominent painters Antonio Vivarini and Michele Giambono.

In 1447 when he was approximately 29 years old he returned to Cattaro, which at that time had 5,000 inhabitants, and was a city of monumental palaces and churches.

The hometown of the painter welcomed him with respect, because already in 1450, the Cattaran chapter granted him a burial place at the small gate towards the bishop’s palace in the Cathedral of Saint Tryphon, and in 1454 the Venetian authorities confirmed the decision of the Cattaran governor, which exempted the painter from the obligation of night and day guard on the Cattaran walls, “because of his loyalty, diligence and praiseworthy service.”

Bon lived in Saint Martin's Street, near the church of Saint Anne. He was a prominent resident of Cattaro and had a famous painting workshop until 1459, when he moved with his family to Ragusa.

He was part of a group called the Ragusan School of Painting which included Biagio di Giorgio da Traù, Giovanni Ungaro, Michael Hansen and Nicolò Raguseo. They specialized in painting icons and iconostases for both churches and monasteries of the Serbian Orthodox Church in Montenegro and Bosnia-Herzegovina, and polyptychs of the Roman Catholic tradition in Ragusa. He died in Ragusa.

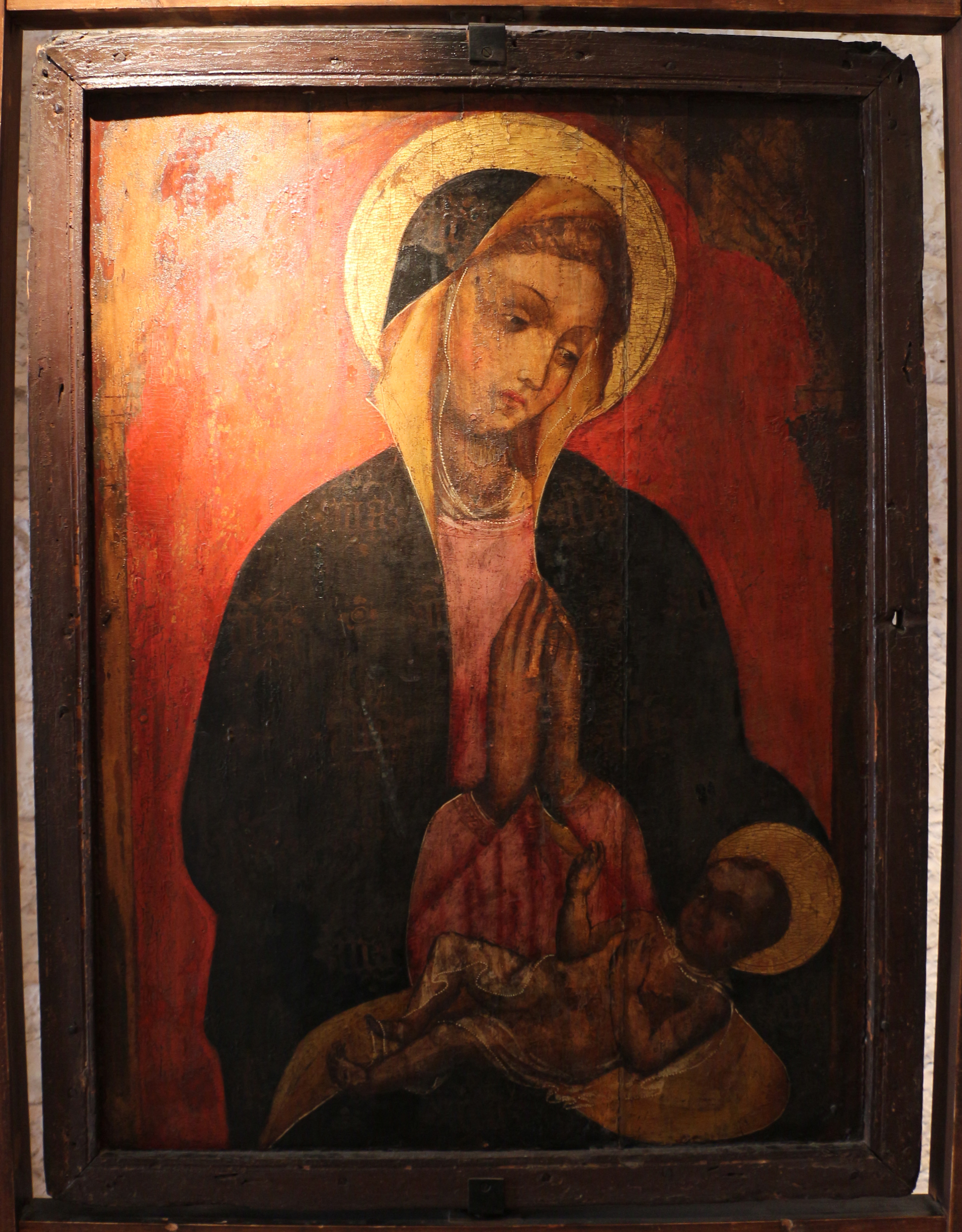
Madonna with Child, also attributed to Bon's student Paolo Basilio

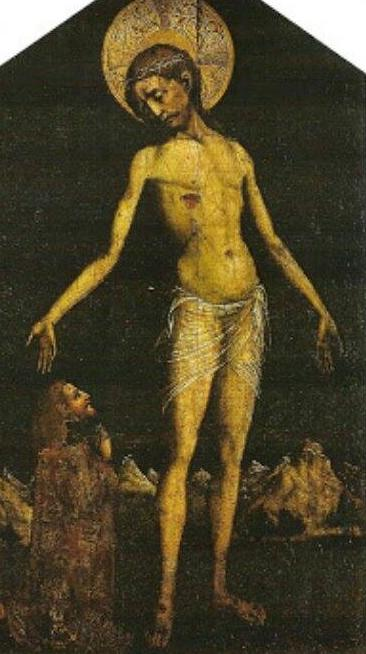
Donor and Christ, 1461

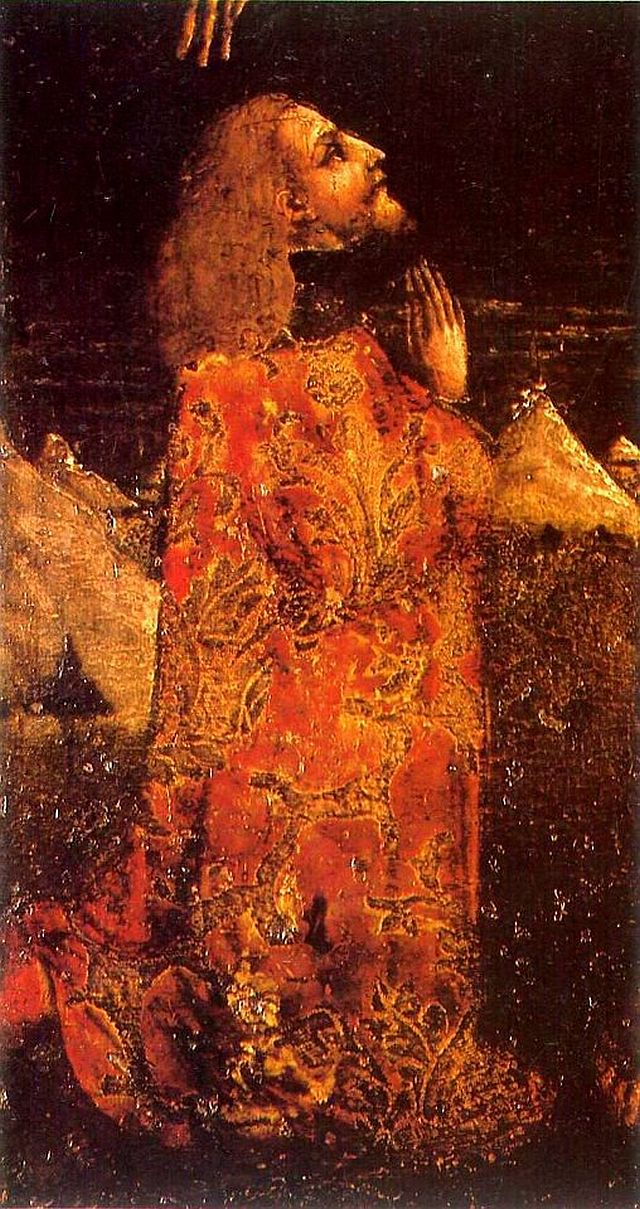
Detail of King Stephen Tomašević from Donor and Christ

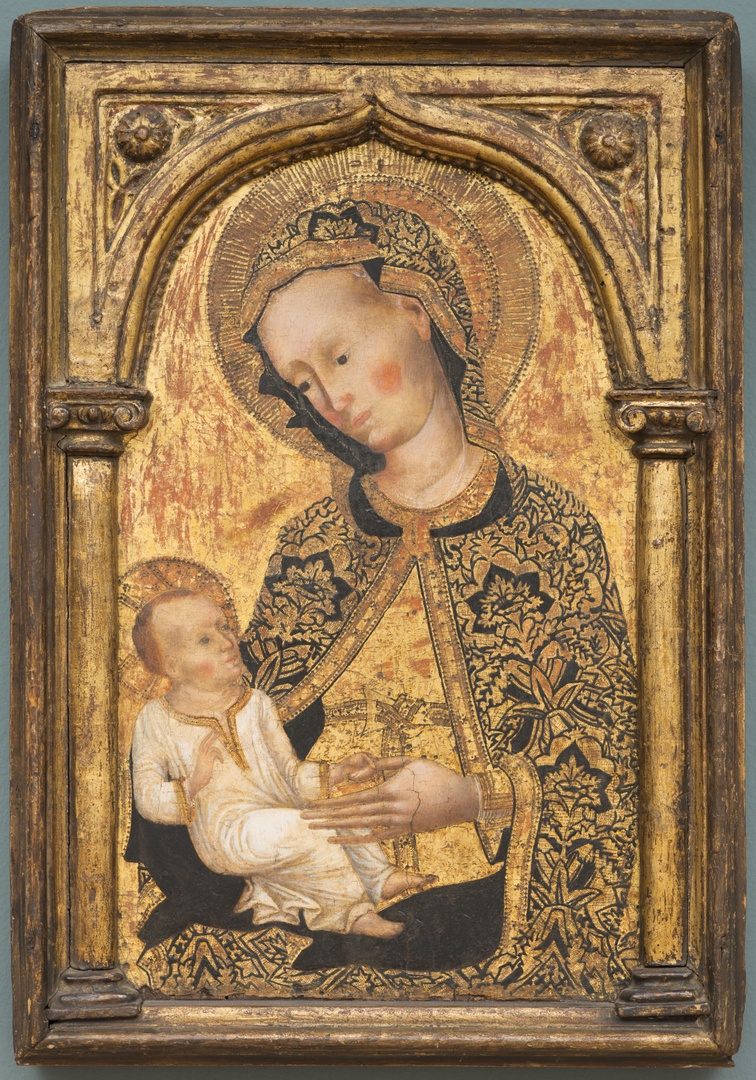
Madonna and Child, circa 1450, Bonnefanten Museum

== See also ==
- Nikola Božidarević
- Mihajlo Hamzić
- Giorgio Schiavone
- Giorgio da Sebenico
- Vitus of Kotor, the architect of Visoki Dečani
