= Planjane, Prizren =

Planjane Planjane (Bosnian) Плањане (Serbian) Pllanjanë (Albanian)
- Village
- Location in Kosovo
- Location: Kosovo
- District: Prizren
- Municipality: Prizren

Population (2024)
  - Total: 1,304
- Time zone: UTC+1 (CET)
  - Summer (DST): UTC+2 (CEST)

Planjane (Serbian Cyrillic: Плањане; Albanian: Pllanjanë; Bosnian: Planjane) is a village near Rečane and Brezovica, Kosovo.

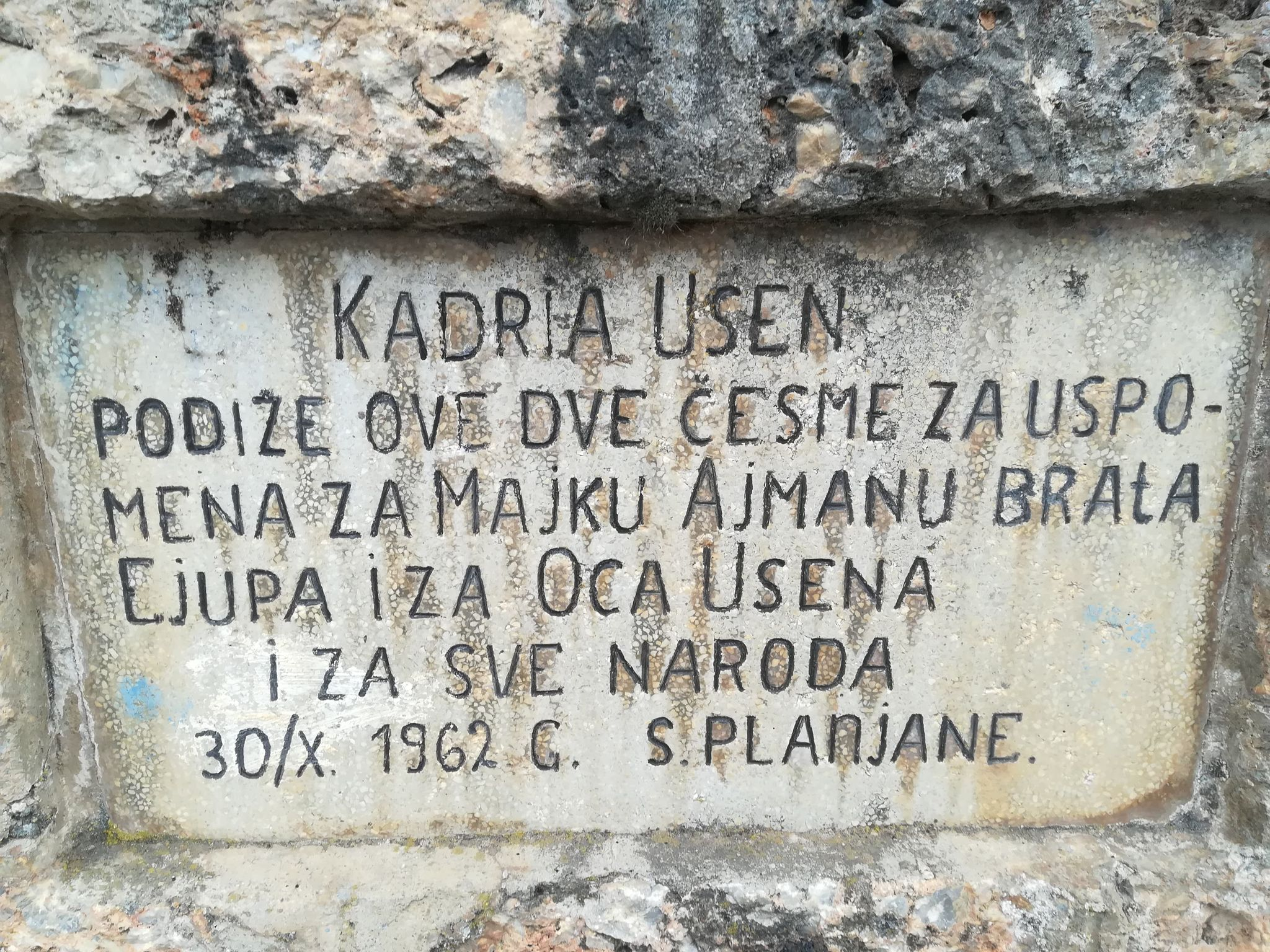

== History ==
Planjane is located in the historical region of Sredačka župa, a medieval župa (small administrative division) within, now part of southeastern Kosovo. It encompassed seven hamlets and was centered in the town of Sredska.

== Demographics ==
The village is inhabited by Bosniaks.

== Notable people ==
- Alen Azari, politician from the Nova Demokratska Stranka party
