= Mandušić =

Origin
- Language: Serbo-Croatian
- Meaning: matronymic from Manduša

Other names
- Variant form: Mandić

Mandušić (Serbian Cyrillic: Мандушић) is a Serb surname, a matronymic derived from Manduša, an augmentative from Manda (a diminutive of Mandalena), hence Mandušić. It is found in Serbia, Croatia, Bosnia and Herzegovina and Montenegro.

In Sredska, Kosovo, the Mandušić family belonged to a Serbian brotherhood called Pejčić, which hailed from Tetovo, which they left after murdering Turk oppressors; a part of the Mandušići settled in Montenegro. At least 14 individuals with the surname died during World War II.

It may refer to:

- Vuk Mandušić (d. 1648), Morlach leader
- Aleksa Mandušić (1887–1959), American soldier in World War I and Medal of Honor recipient
- Ljubica Mandušić-Gazikalović, Serbian Righteous Among the Nations
- Gornji Mandušići, hamlet in Katuni, Šestanovac, Croatia
