= Marin Mandić =

Croatian Catholic priest (1926–2011)

Marin Mandić SDB
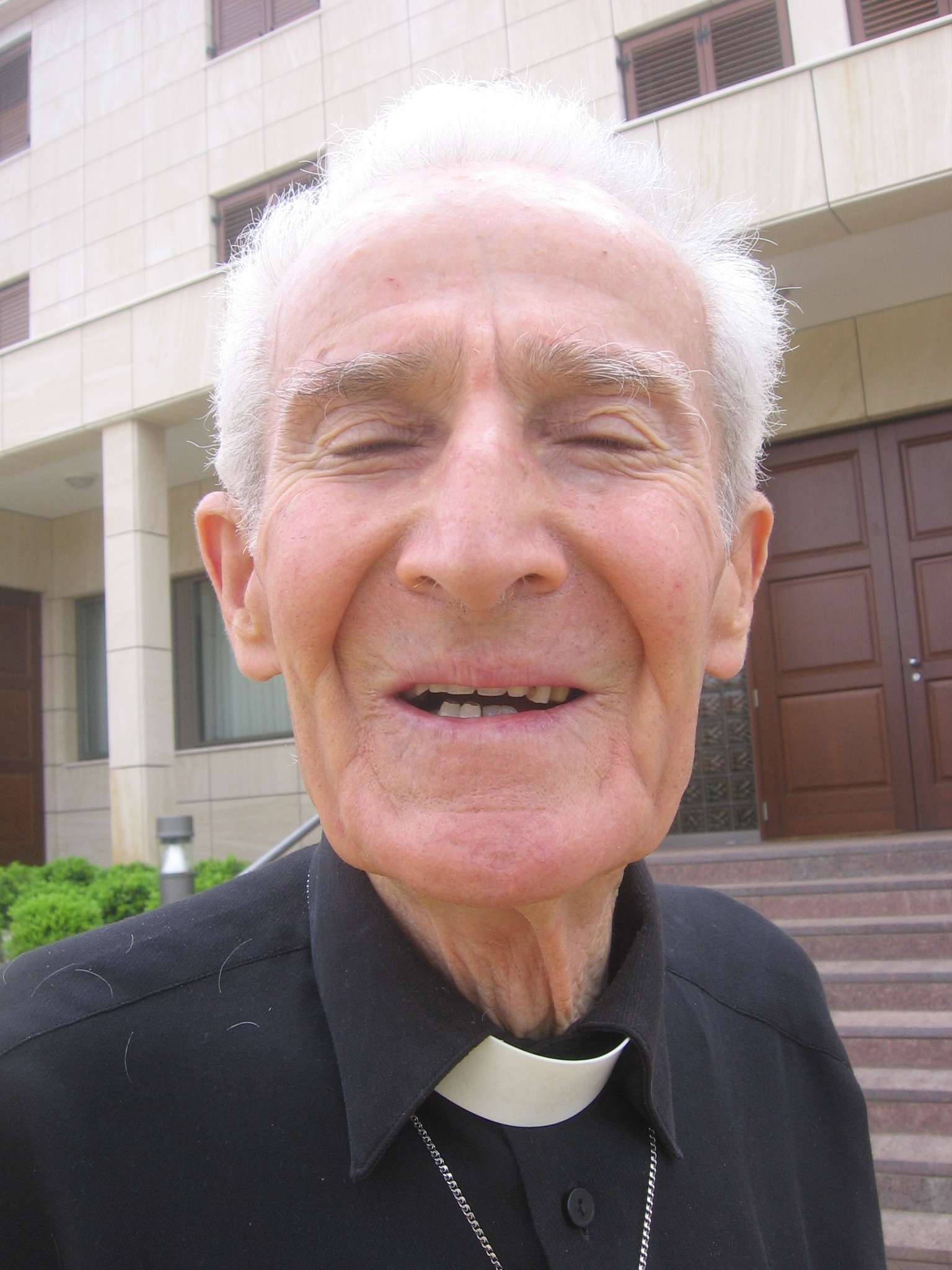
- Mandić in Arbanasi near Zadar, 2008
- Born: Marin Mandić; August 12, 1926; Zakučac, Kingdom of Yugoslavia (now Croatia)
- Died: March 7, 2011 (aged 84); Santa María Tlahuitoltepec, Mexico
- Resting place: Santa María Tlahuitoltepec, Mexico
- Education: University of Zagreb
- Occupations: Catholic priest, missionary, writer, publicist, academic
- Writing career
- Pen name: Don Marino
- Genres: Religious and educational literature

Marin Mandić SDB (12 August 1926 – 7 March 2011) was a Croatian Salesian Catholic priest, writer, and missionary.

== Biography ==
=== Priestly activity ===
Mandić was born in Zakučac (Omiš) on August 12, 1926. He graduated from the Classical Gymnasium in Split in 1947. He joined the Salesians in 1938 in Knežija, and after the novitiate in Slovenia on the Castle of Škrljevo he took his first religious vows in 1944. He studied theology for the first two years in Ljubljana, and continued and completed it in Zagreb.

He was ordained a priest in 1953. In 1972 he graduated from the Faculty of Philosophy in Zagreb. He was an educator at the Episcopal Seminary in Zadar, and for thirteen years an educator and professor of Salesian seminarians of "Srednja vjerska škola za pripremanje svećenika" (Note: 'Secondary religious school for the preparation of priests') in Križevci and Rijeka. His brother and all who knew him agree that Mandić "was an enthusiastic priest, a brilliant storyteller, a witness and a lover of Our Lady - happy in his priestly and missionary vocation". He was happy to emphasize why he was given that name and explained to everyone that his name Marin means 'belonging to Mary'.

Although he himself lived an ascetic life and was obviously always thin, he did not allow his students to do special fasts or mortifications, following the example of his founder Don Bosco: "You do not need any other penance than to perform your daily duties!" Nevertheless, he recommended moderation in eating and drinking not only by his example but also by his words:

'If the body becomes thin due to fasting, the soul becomes fat; but if the body becomes fat due to gluttony, the soul becomes thin.' (Note: Ako tijelo zbog posta mršavi, duša se deblja; ako se pak tijelo zbog proždrljivosti deblja, duša mršavi.)

=== In Križevci ===
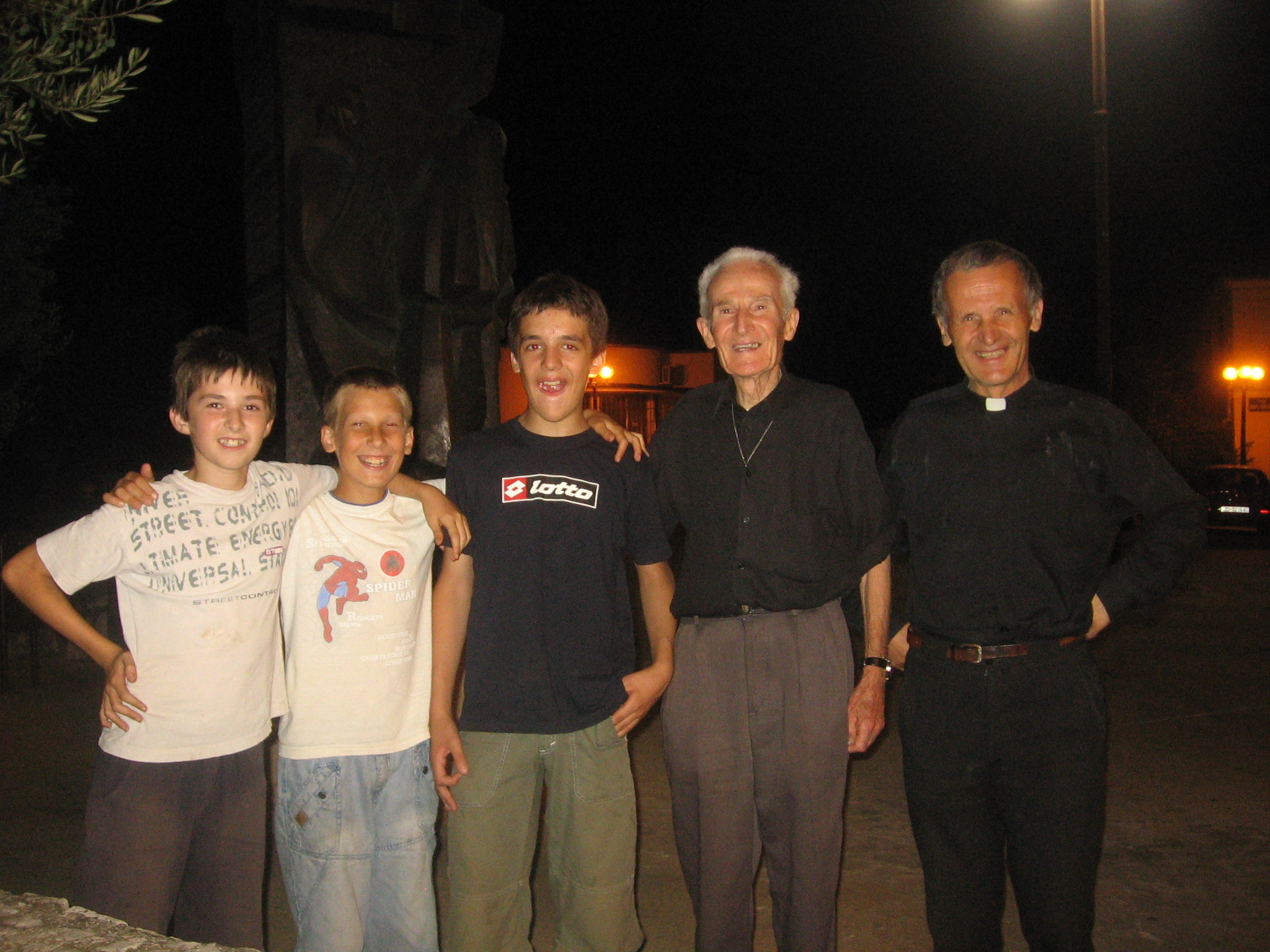
Salesians Mandić and Janez Jelen with youth in Zadar

In Križevci, the Salesians, who had numerous spiritual vocations from all over the former Yugoslavia, were received by the Greek Catholic Bishop Gabrijel Bukatko in his episcopal palace in 1959. At that time, the Salesians had previously been guests of the Archdiocese of Zadar, which also had many of its own vocations.

In Križevci, Mandić was a catechist for two years; his school counselor was his close Dalmatian compatriot, excellent professor of Greek and Latin Mirko Bajić, assistant Peter Bogataj, confessor Karel Podkubovšek, and director Anton Bajuk (1913–1979) from Bela Krajina, who bore the signs of communist post-war violence until his death. In Marijin Dvor on May 24, 1945, a traditional procession with a statue of Mary Help of Christians was held. When the pilgrims were returning, they were met by a "gathering" of partisan invalids, who beat the faithful and priests with crutches and sticks. Among other things, they seriously wounded Bajuk in the leg. Younger Franjo Crnjaković was also in the procession, who had a less expensive escape.

Mandić was also a parish priest and chaplain, and a sought-after confessor in various places in Croatia, and in Podsused from 1961 to 1963. He also worked pastorally in Germany. He held retreats in Croatia and Slovenia and people's missions in Croatia and Serbia. During the war in Bosnia and Herzegovina, from 1991 to 1995, he was a priest of the Sisters of Worshipers of the Blood of Christ in Bosanski Aleksandrovac near Banja Luka.

=== Missionary, poet and writer ===
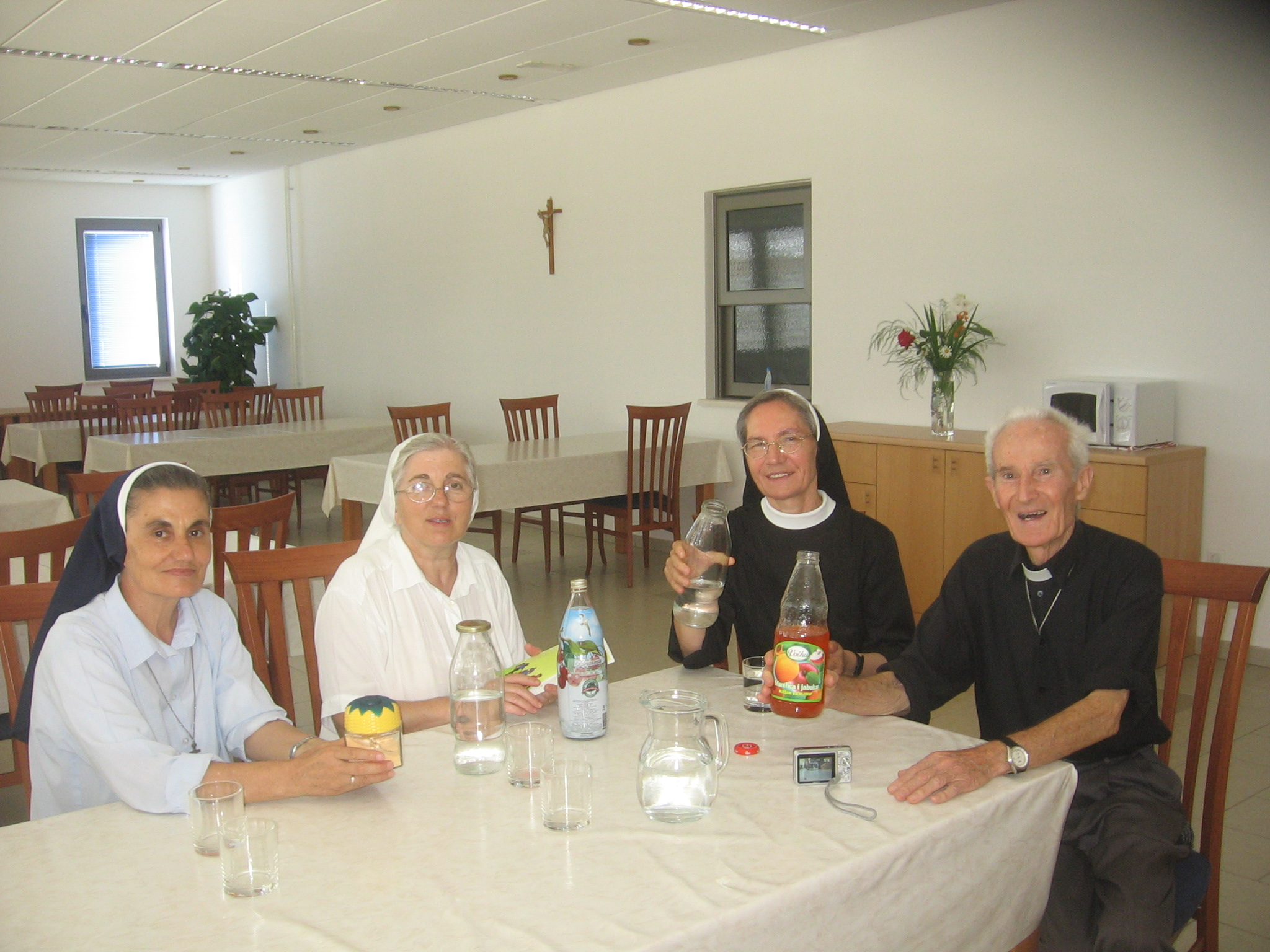
Mandić visiting nuns in Zadar

"Realizing that God was calling him to a more perfect way of life, he embarked on a very demanding missionary service in distant Mexico, where for years he visited his poor but devout parishioners in remote mountain villages, comforting them, encouraging them, distributing the sacraments and being happy". He was known as a person who was always smiling and cheerful, especially when he wholeheartedly took on the missionary service in Mexico, where for over twenty years he was a spreader of Christ's love among the Mixe tribe in southern Mexico. Also, thanks to the selfless work of Catholic missionaries like him, Protestant charismatic sects have the least influence on Catholic believers in all of Latin America, since 81% of the Mexican population considers themselves Catholic.

In the very distant and almost completely unknown country of Mexico, in the even more distant Indian province in the south of that Central American country, the always smiling Mandić was for his extremely poor faithful "a light and support, a giver of earthly goods, a witness to Mary's faith and care, Her motherly love for them. In return, he received their childlike gratitude, trust and love". He was firmly convinced that with his completely selfless and cheerful giving he always received more than he gave.

He also engaged in writing and published a dozen books under his own publishing house, and published articles, reviews and discussions in various magazines and newspapers. Due to the difficulties of the time, he collaborated with various publishers and writers, such as with his Salesian brother Vinko Furlan, and even with the poet and close fellow villager Jure Kaštelan, although he was of a different – Communist orientation.

He was always cheerful, optimistic and on the move, and so was he in 2008, when he collected donations for his missions during a visit to his homeland, as well as editing materials for his publications. He also visited his benefactors, to whom he was grateful for their prayerful and financial support; among them, the nuns of Zadar occupied a prominent place.

The young people who happened to gather in Zadar that evening immediately accepted him and were honored to have their picture taken with him as a fond memory.

Then he mentioned to his former student from Križevci, Jelena, in confidence that he wanted to die and rest among "his" Indians, who worship the Mother of God with childlike devotion, similar to the Croats, but never curse her, as some of his countrymen, and even believers, do.

== Death and memory ==
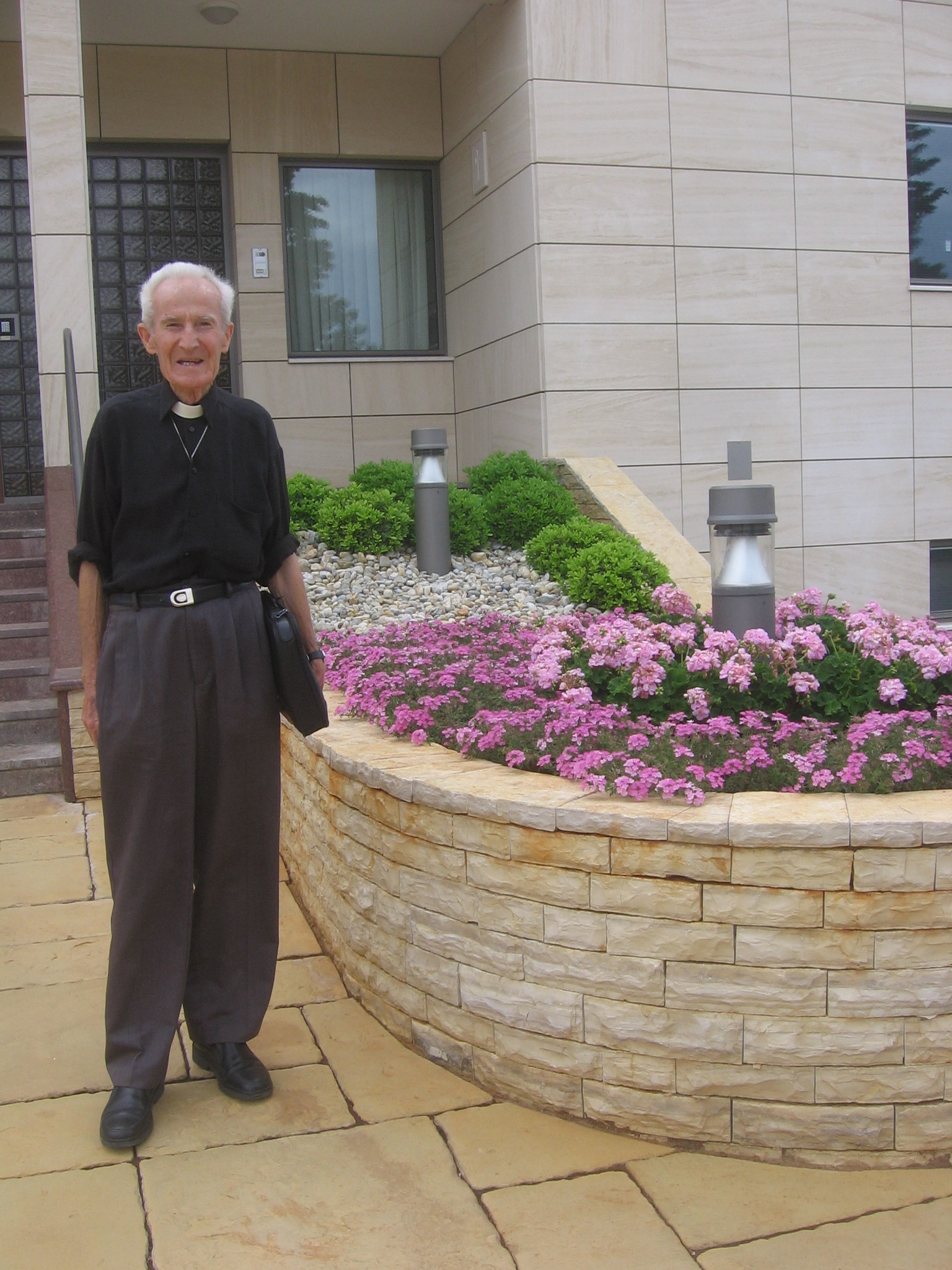
Mandić in front of the decorated entrance to the House of Nuns in Zadar

He actually returned to the missions and worked there until his death. Believers were convinced that Jesus had transplanted that beautiful flower into the heavenly garden. He really loved to decorate the park in Križevci, especially the blooming garden with the statue of the Immaculate Mother of God in the center, together with the boys.

He died on March 7, 2011, in Mexico at the age of eighty-five, having spent sixty-seven years in religious vows and fifty-eight years in the priesthood. He was buried on March 9 in Tlahuitoltepec and a Requiem Mass was celebrated the following day in the Church of Mary Help of Christians on Kman, in Split.

== Selected works ==
1. Osmijeh : misionar ljubavi (Smile: Missionary of Love) / likovna oprema Mato Andrić
2. Molitvenik Duhu Svetomu (Prayer to the Holy Ghost)| Publisher: Sv. Antun Padovanski Rijeka, Kantrida
3. Sedam meditacija sv. Ivana Boska (Seven Meditations of St. John Bosco)
4. Don Marin Mandić : OBITELJSKA SLAVLJA — Amor cantat / Ljubav pjeva (FAMILY CELEBRATION — Amor cantat / Love sings)
5. Antologija malog misionara (Anthology of the little missionary)
6. Knjiga života (Book of Life)

== See also ==
- Catholic Church in Croatia
- Catholic Church in Mexico
- Salesians of Don Bosco
