= Sredska, Prizren =

Sredskë Средска Sredska
- Village
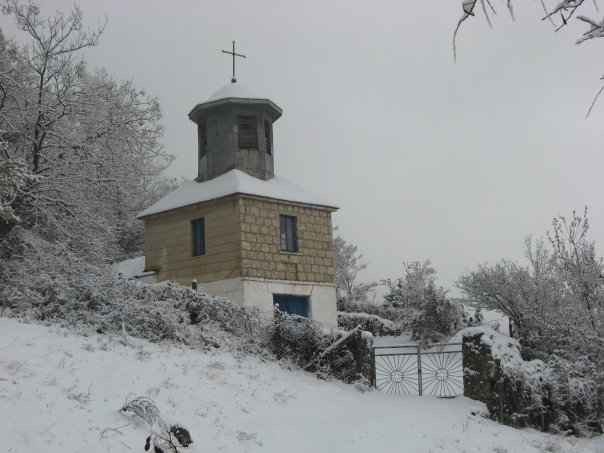
- Church of the Holy Virgin

- Location in Kosovo
- Location: Kosovo
- District: Prizren
- Municipality: Prizren

Population (2024)
  - Total: 91
- Time zone: UTC+1 (CET)
  - Summer (DST): UTC+2 (CEST)

Sredska (Albanian: Srecka, Serbian Cyrillic: Средска) is a village in the municipality of Prizren, Kosovo. It was the seat of medieval Sredačka Župa.

== Anthropology ==
Yugoslav ethnologist Tatomir Vukanović (1907–1997) studied settlements in Kosovo in 1947. Sredska was composed of seven hamlets, which had the following brotherhoods and families:

- Hamlet of Rakoči–Račevići or Račojci (27 houses)
- Jakšići, hailing from Herzegovina, settled at the end of the 17th- and beginning of 18th century.
- Hamlet of Pejčići (15 houses), Mandušići with several branches
- Jankovići, Dobrosavci and Kačarevići
- Hamlet of Palicojki (30 houses), Ljamovci–Ljamovići
- Ogarovci
- Velikinci
- Zrnzevci–Zrnzevići
- Šoševci (5 houses)
- Kabasovci–Radivojevići
- Čukalovci
- Šipovci, Džinovci and Softići
- Hamlet of Krajci or Krajčići–Karalejići
- Sopkinci–Živkovci
- Jeftići and Radovci–Radići
- Hamlet of Stajkovce (31 houses)
- Hamlet of Bogosevce or Bogošovce
- Kovačevci
- Tanaskovci
- Hamlet of Milačići (?)

Apart from the native families (starosedeoci), all other families were settled between the 16th and 18th centuries.

== Churches ==
=== Church of the Holy Virgin ===
At the hamlet of Pejcici, today north of the highway, there is the biggest but also the youngest church in the group of churches of the Sredska district, dedicated to the Holy Virgin. One-nave, semi-ovally domed temple, with the altar apse which is shallow and three-sided from outside and in the shape of niche in its interior, had been probably built several years before it was painted, i.e. in 1646/1647. It was built thanks to the contributions of a great number of villagers whose names are mentioned in the founders’ fresco inscription. The well preserved paintings include the zones of standing figures, saints’ busts in medallions, compositions of the cycles of the Suffering and Great Holidays arranged in two separate columns and the standard decoration of the altar and dome areas. With the gamut reduced to colour and the prominent drawing, the paintings of this church are rather illustrative than having artistic value. In the second half of the 19th century, a square storeyed priprata and a light wooden belfry above it were built in front of the church.

=== Church of St. Đorđe (George) ===
In the middle of the village of Sredska, by the village road, there is a miniature church for which the villagers say that it was a family chapel and which is the oldest and the most interesting monument of this district. This status of the church is ensured because of its simple architecture (one-nave foundation with the apse hardly rounded from outside, semi-oval vault and exterior dimensions of little over 5 m of length and 3 m of width) and the frescoes. An unknown painter did not pay any attention to the dimensions of the building and, already in the first zone below the painted arcades, he painted monumental modelled figures of holy doctors and holy warriors clad in lively aristocratic garments. He painted the homage to the lamb and Virgin’s bust with angels in the small altar niche and archdeacon Stefan in the prothesis niche. The light translucent colours and the inclination towards decorativeness contribute to the fact that, out of the previously offered years in the literature, we accept the year of 1530 as the most acceptable. Finally, it should be added that these frescoes attract attention also because of the painting technology since they were painted on the mud mortar with coarse chaff.

== Notable people ==
- Vuk Isaković (1696-1759), Austrian soldier
- Čolak-Anta (1777-1853), Serbian revolutionary
- Jake Allex (1887-1959), Serbian-American soldier
