= Leopold Mandić =

Croatian Catholic priest and saint (1866–1942)

Saint Leopold Mandić OFMCap
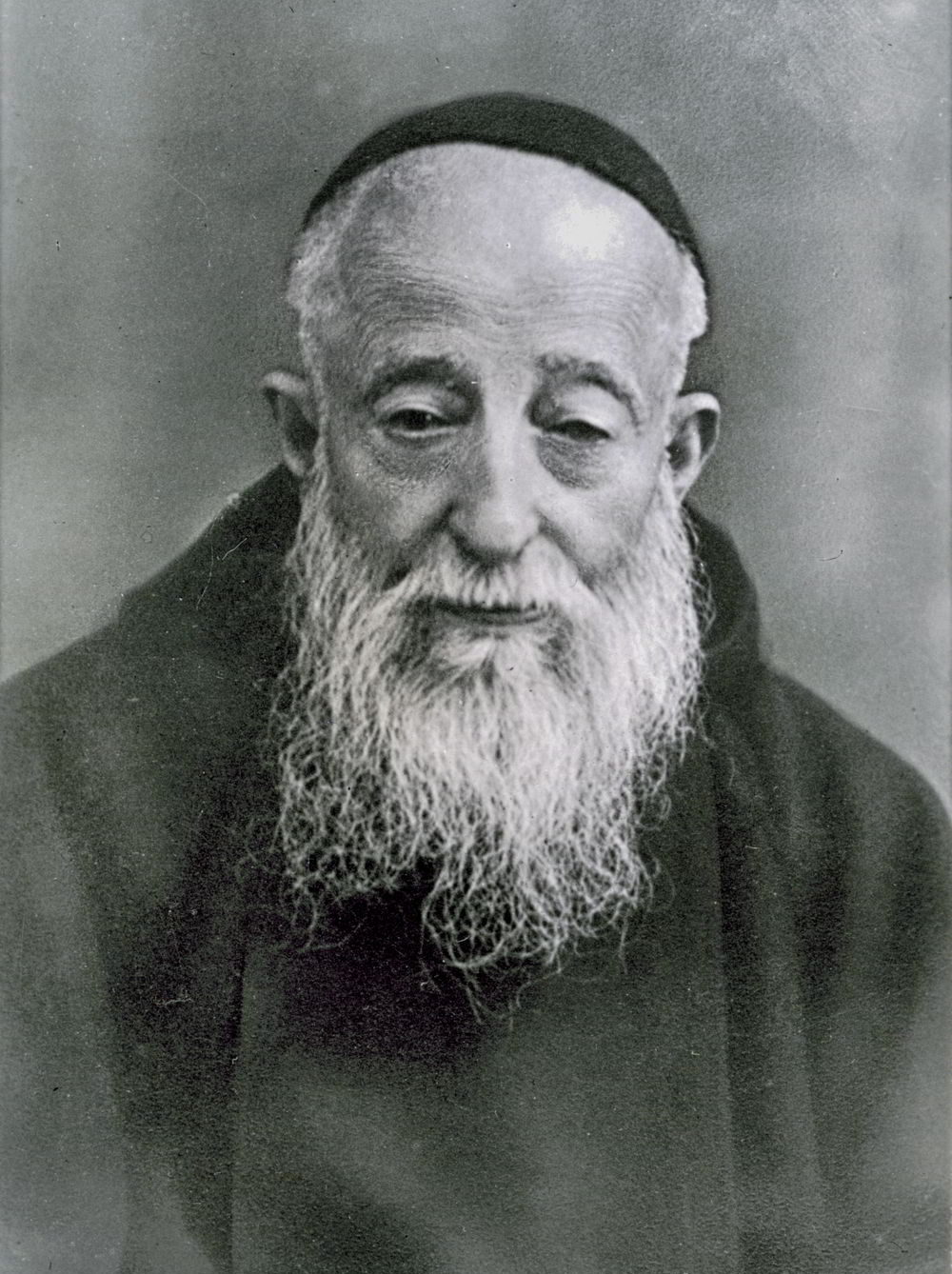
- Portrait of Mandić
- Born: Bogdan Ivan Mandić; 12 May 1866; Herceg Novi, Kingdom of Dalmatia, Austrian Empire
- Died: 30 July 1942 (aged 76); Padua, Kingdom of Italy
- Venerated in: Roman Catholic Church
- Beatified: 2 May 1976, Saint Peter's Basilica by Pope Paul VI
- Canonized: 16 October 1983, Saint Peter's Basilica by Pope John Paul II
- Major shrine: Shrine of Saint Leopold Mandić, Padua, Italy; see Patronate
- Feast: 12 May (30 July in Roman martyrology)
- Patronage: Cancer sufferers

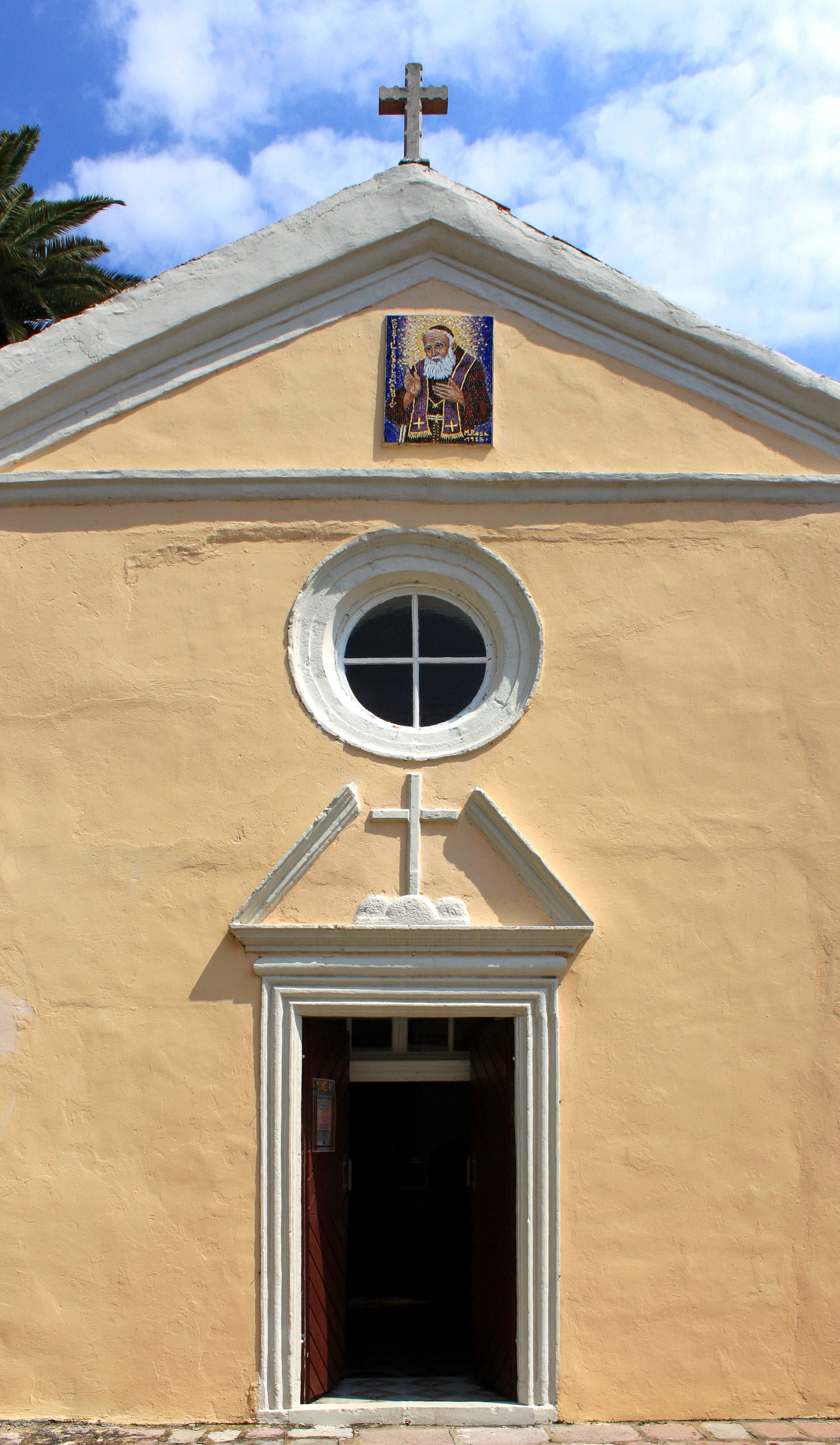
Church of St. Leopold Mandić in Herceg Novi

Leopold Bogdan Mandić [Mandich], OFMCap (also known as Leopold of Castelnuovo, Italian: Leopoldo da Castelnuovo; 12 May 1866 – 30 July 1942) was a Croatian Capuchin friar and Catholic priest, who suffered from disabilities that would plague his speech and stature. He developed tremendous spiritual strength in spite of his disabilities and became extremely popular in his ministry as a confessor, often spending 12–15 hours in the confessional.

Although Mandić wanted to be a missionary in Eastern Europe, he spent almost all his adult life in Italy, living in Padua from 1906 until his death. He also spent one year in an Italian prison during World War I, since he would not renounce his Croatian nationality. He dreamed unceasingly about reuniting the Catholic and Orthodox churches and going to the Orient. He became known as an Apostle of Confession and an Apostle of Unity.

== Life ==
=== Early life ===
He was born Bogdan Ivan Mandić in the coastal town of Herceg Novi, in the Bay of Kotor, then in the Austrian Empire but today part of Montenegro. He was the twelfth child of Dragica Zarević and Petar Antun Mandić, owner of an Adriatic fishing fleet, natives of Zakučac (in the hinterland of the city of Omiš, 28 km from Split). Bogdan's parents were devout Catholics; father accompanied little Bogdan to church every morning for Holy Mass, while Mandić remembered his mother as the person "to whom I owe everything that I am."

His family originates from Bosnia, from where they settled to Dalmatia and later in the Bay of Kotor.

Mandić grew up in the orbit of a community of Capuchin friars based in the Province of Venice who had served in his town for two centuries, dating from when the area was ruled by the Republic of Venice. Physically malformed and delicate, he grew to a height of only 1.35 m (4 ft 5 in), with a clumsy walk. He also had a stutter and stomach ailments. Having felt called to follow that way of life, in November 1882, when he was 16, he went to Udine to enter the minor seminary of the Capuchin Venetian Province. Two years later he was admitted to the friars' novitiate in Bassano del Grappa, where he was clothed in the Capuchin habit and given the religious name of Leopold. On 3 May 1885, he made his first profession of religious vows, after which he was sent to pursue his studies for Holy Orders in Capuchin friaries in Padua and Venice. He made his profession of perpetual vows at Padua on October 28, 1888.

=== Priesthood ===
On 20 September 1890, Mandić was ordained to the priesthood at the Basilica of Santa Maria della Salute in Venice at the age of 24 by Cardinal Domenico Agostini, Patriarch of Venice.

After his ordination, Mandić was sent to posts in various Capuchin friaries in the Venice region and in Croatia. He could not speak loudly enough to preach publicly. Among his various tasks were the teaching of the seminarians who followed him, as well as the household duties of the house, such as porter. Common to all his assignments was that of the duty of a confessor at the church which the friars served. This went on until 1906, when he was assigned to the Friary of Santa Croce in Padua. It was there that he would spend the rest of his life.

=== Death ===
Mandić suffered from esophagus cancer, which would ultimately lead to his death at age 76. On 30 July 1942, while preparing for Mass, he collapsed on the floor. He was then brought to his cell, where he was given the last rites. Friars who had gathered at his bed began singing Salve Regina and saw that Leopold died as they sang "O clement, O loving, O sweet Virgin Mary".

== Veneration ==
As a result of the bombing during World War II, the church and part of the friary in Padua where Mandić lived were demolished, but his cell and confessional were left unharmed. He had predicted this before his death, saying, "The church and the friary will be hit by the bombs, but not this little cell. Here God exercised so much mercy for people, it must remain as a monument to God's goodness." The Sanctuary of Leopold Mandić was built to contain the confessional. Pope Paul VI beatified Leopold on 2 May 1976. He was canonized by Pope John Paul II during the General Assembly of the Synod of Bishops on 16 October 1983. Leopold is hailed as the "Apostle of Unity".

=== Jubilee Year ===
At the personal request of Pope Francis, Mandić's remains were brought to Rome for veneration during the 2015–2016 Extraordinary Jubilee of Mercy. He and his fellow Capuchin friar, Pio of Pietrelcina, were designated as saint-confessors to inspire people to become reconciled to the Church and to God, by the confession of their sins. Their bodies were available for veneration, first at the Basilica of Saint Lawrence outside the Walls, administered by the Capuchin friars, then at St. Peter's Basilica.

== Patronate ==
Churches and parishes

- St. Leopold Mandić Croatian Catholic Parish, Victoria
- St. Leopold Mandić parish church, Lima, Peru
- St. Leopold Bogdan Mandić Church and parish in Dragunja Donja (hr)
- St. Leopold Bogdan Mandić Parish in Koprivnica
- St. Leopold Mandić Parish and parish church (hr) in Orehovica near Bedekovčina, Croatia
- St. Leopold Mandić Parish in Osijek
- St. Leopold Mandić Parish in Požega, Croatia
- St. Leopold Mandić Parish in Slavonski Brod
- St. Leopold Mandić Parish in Virovitica
- St. Leopold Mandić Parish in Ljubljanica-Voltino, Zagreb

Croatian Catholic Mission in Auckland in 1990 was dedicated to Mandić.

Monasteries

- St. Leopold Mandić Monastery (hr) in Travnik of Daughters of Divine Charity
- St. Leopold Bogdan Mandić Monastery and parish in Dubrava, Zagreb

Sanctuaries

- St. Leopold Bogdan Mandić Sanctuary in Maglaj
- Sanctuary of Leopold Mandić in Padua
- Sanctuary of Saint Leopold Bogdan Mandić in Zakučac near Omiš

Mandić is patron saint of Zakučac.
