= Sanctuary of Leopold Mandic =

Catholic church in Padua, Italy

Coordinates: 45°23′34.58″N 11°52′12.23″E

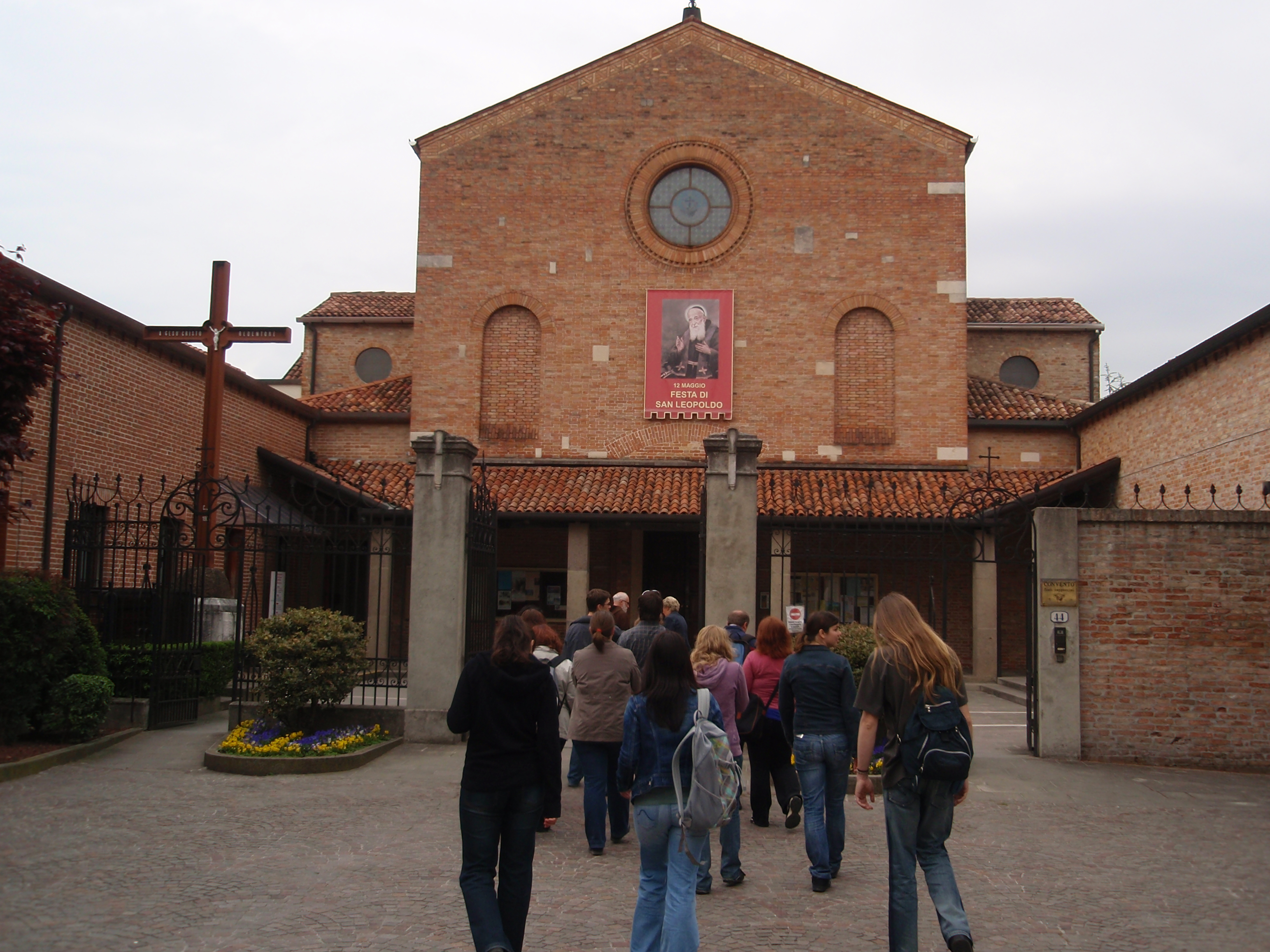
A group entering the Sanctuary of the Leopoldo Mandic compound.

The Sanctuary of Leopold Mandić is a Roman Catholic church located on Piazzale Santa Croce of Padua, region of Veneto, Italy; the church is now dedicated to the saint, who served as a Capuchin friar and priest in this church, and was canonized in 1983.

A church at the site had been built by the Capuchin order in the early 19th-century but was destroyed by bombardment during the Second World War. It was rebuilt using designs of the architect Giovanni Morassuti. Putatively the only structure surviving the bombing was the original confessional booth of Leopold Mandić, who had died in the midst of the war in 1942.
