= Mihajlo Hamzić =

Dalmatian painter

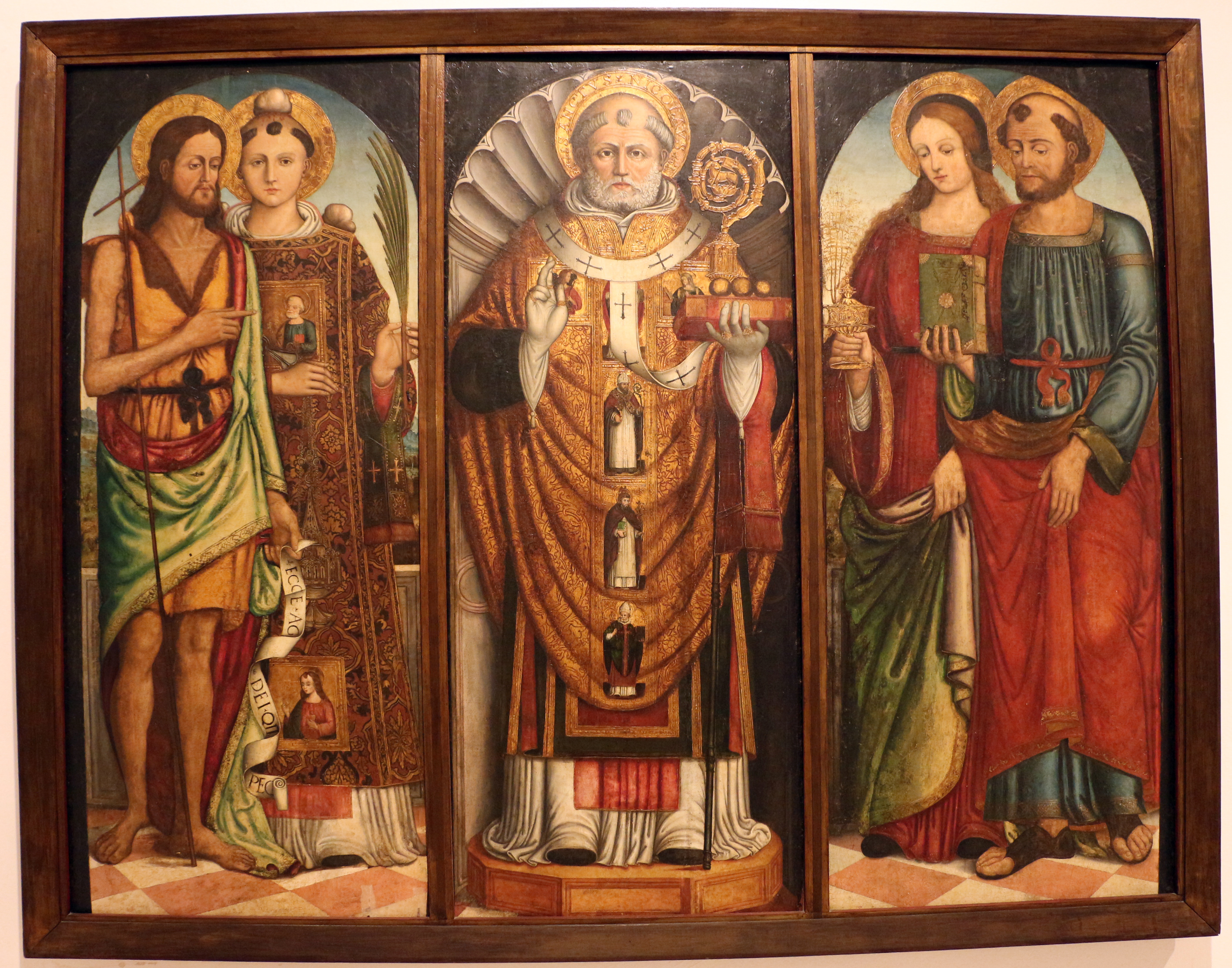
- Luccari Triptych in the Dominican Church in Ragusa
- Born: 1482; Ston, Republic of Ragusa (modern-day Croatia)
- Died: 1518 (age 36); Ragusa, Republic of Ragusa (modern-day Croatia)
- Other name: Michael Joannis Theutonici
- Known for: Painting
- Works: Baptism of Christ; Luccari Triptych

Mihajlo Hamzić (1482 – 1518) also known as Michael Joannis Theutonici or Michael Hansen, was one of the outstanding Dalmatian painters in 15th century Ragusa during the transition from Gothic to Renaissance - along with Vicko Lovrin and Nikola Božidarević.

== Biography ==
Mihajlo's father, Hans, was originally from Cologne in Germany, and had come to work in Ston on the maintenance of cannons. His mother was the daughter of a Ston blacksmith. Mihajlo was born in Ston as the second of four children. He studied art in Mantua at the studio of Andrea Mantegna and returned to Dubrovnik in 1508. He is first mentioned in a document from 1509 in which the Council of the Prayer accepted his painting of St. John the Baptist for the Rector's Palace, Dubrovnik. Soon after that, he painted the "Baptism of Christ" for the great room of the Rector's Palace, where it still hangs today. He also worked as a clerk at the Dubrovnik customs office in order to earn a living.

Mihajlo Hamzić also collaborated with other painters, so in 1512 he brought the painter, Pierre Giovanni of Venice and Vlaho Nikolin of Dubrovnik, into his workshop. He later formed a joint trading business with his brother Jacob, but in 1514 they got into trouble, and Mihajlo was forced to flee from Dubrovnik. When he returned, he restricted himself to painting. A document from 1515 mentions him getting a three-month salvoconduct (residence permit) to paint for the cathedral. In 1518, together with Pierre Giovanni, he was given the task of completing the polyptych for the altar of Saint Joseph in the cathedral, which Nikola Božidarević had started, but Hamzić died suddenly before he could finish. He died in Dubrovnik, young and in debt, and sadly his last painting, the polyptych, was destroyed in the Dubrovnik earthquake of 1667.

== Works ==
Hamzić's work marks the end of the golden age of art in Dubrovnik when it began to decline. Only two of his paintings have survived: The baptism of Christ in Rector's Palace and the Triptych for the Luccari family in the Dominican monastery in Ragusa.

The Baptism of Christ in the Rector's Palace has Mantegna characteristics in which the figures of Christ and John the Baptist are placed with Christ's robe directly in the foreground in front of a wide rocky landscape painted in shades of brown and green, displaying an excellent knowledge of aerial perspective. Hamzić brought lyrical accents and somewhat naïve pictorial elements (birds and deer), into a serious and strictly imagined landscape. This work was first attributed to Hamzić by Karlo Kovač, and Ljubo Karaman accepted his attribution and further referred to Mantegna's apparent influence.

The Triptych for the altar of the Luccari family in the Dominican church from 1512 is now kept in the collection of the Dominican monastery. In the center of the triptych is St Nicholas, on the left are John the Baptist and St Stephen, and on the right are Mary Magdalene and St Mark. Although the strong modeling of the figures indicates the clear influence of Andrea Mantegna, this painting is very different from the Baptism in the Rector's Palace, being much more successful in its use of color, with fine contrasts and color rhythm inspired by Venetian paintings.

== See also ==
- Lovro Dobričević
- Nikola Božidarević

== Sources ==
- Karlo Kovač, Nikolaus Ragusinus und seine Zeit, Jahrbuch des Kunsthistorischen Institutes der k. k. Zentralkommission für Denkmalpflege (Wien), 11(1917) pp. 9. and 63.
- Ljubo Karaman, O domaćem slikarstvu u Dalmaciji za vrijeme mletačkog gospodstva, Almanah Jadranska straža (Beograd), 1927., pp. 558.–586.
- Sergio Bettini & Giuseppe Fiocco, Arte italiana e arte croata: Italia e Croazia, Roma, 1942., p. 301.
- Kruno Prijatelj, Dubrovačko slikarstvo XV–XVI stoljeća, Zagreb, 1968.
