= Nikola Božidarević =

Dalmatian painter

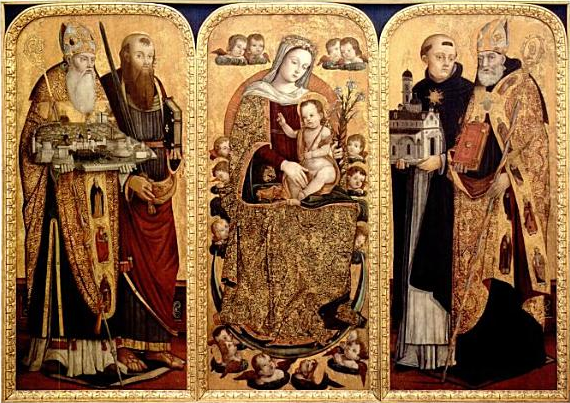
- Bonda Triptych in the Dominican Church of Ragusa
- Born: c. 1460; Cattaro, Republic of Venice (modern-day Montenegro)
- Died: 26 November 1517 (age 56–57); Ragusa, Republic of Ragusa (modern-day Croatia)
- Other name: Nicholas of Ragusa
- Known for: Painting
- Works: Bonda Triptych; Annunciation; Giorgi Altarpiece

Nikola Božidarević (pronounced [bɔʒi-ˈdə:rɔvitɕˈ]; more commonly Nicholas of Ragusa (Italian: Nicolò Raguseo, Latin: Nicolaus Rhagusinus, Croatian: Nikola Dubrovčanin c. 1460 – 26 November 1517), was a Dalmatian painter from the Republic of Ragusa, born in Cattaro, Venetian Dalmatia, at the turn of the Gothic in the Renaissance.

== Life ==
The son of the painter Božidar Vlatković of Slano (today Croatia), he was probably born in Kotor (today Montenegro) around 1460. He was mentioned in 1475 as a fresco painter at the Rector's Palace, Dubrovnik and in 1476 as a pupil of painter Petar Ognjanović, whose workshop in 1477 was based on the doctrine of Venice.

He was a hard-working and greatly sought-after man, as can be seen from numerous documents and contracts kept in the Dubrovnik archives. Monasteries like the Franciscans in Cavtat and the Dubrovnik Dominicans commissioned works from him, as did noble families and individuals and some churches. After a long stay in Italy, he reappears in Dubrovnik in 1494, where he and his father concluded an agreement for polyptych on Gradi's altar in the Dubrovnik Dominican church.

== Works ==
Of seventeen works by Nikola Božidarević recorded in the Dubrovnik Archives, only four paintings remain: a triptych on a side altar in the Bonda Chapel of the Dominican monastery in Dubrovnik, The Annunciation in the art gallery of the Dominican church, the Giorgi family's altarpiece in the capitulary hall of the Dominican monastery, and another triptych in the Franciscan church on Lopud has also been ascribed to him.

== Gallery ==
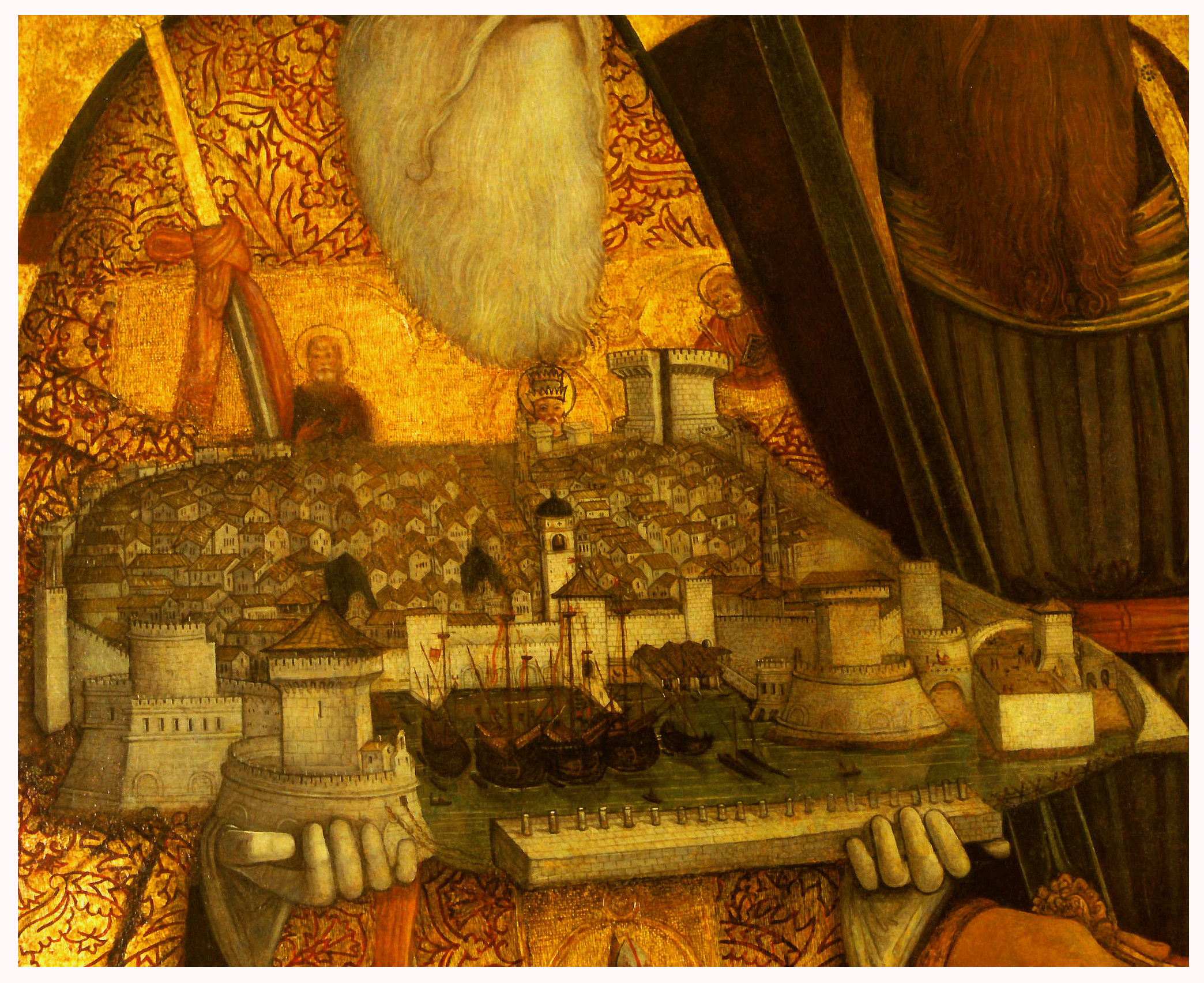
Detail: Model of Ragusa held by Saint Blaise

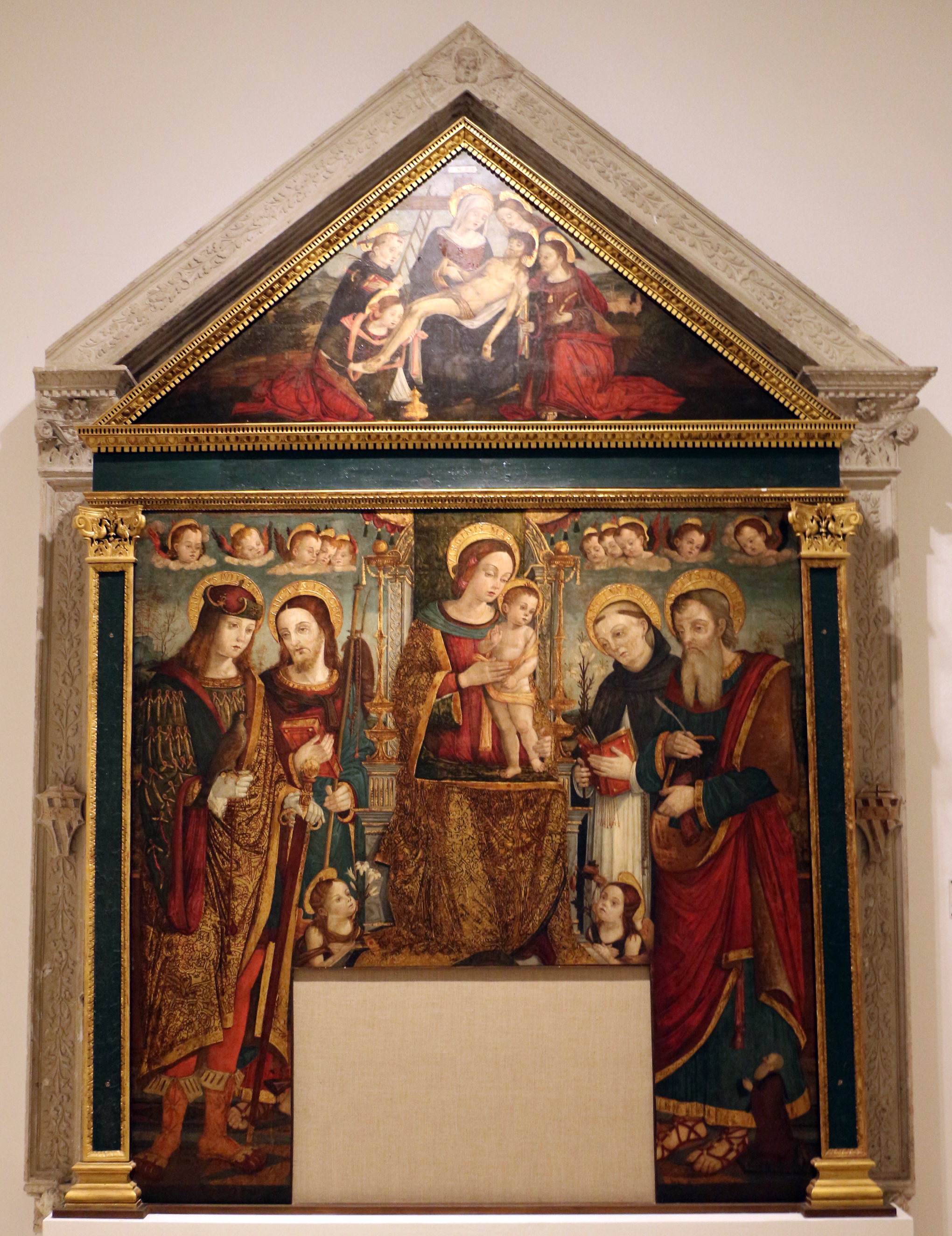
Giorgi Altarpiece

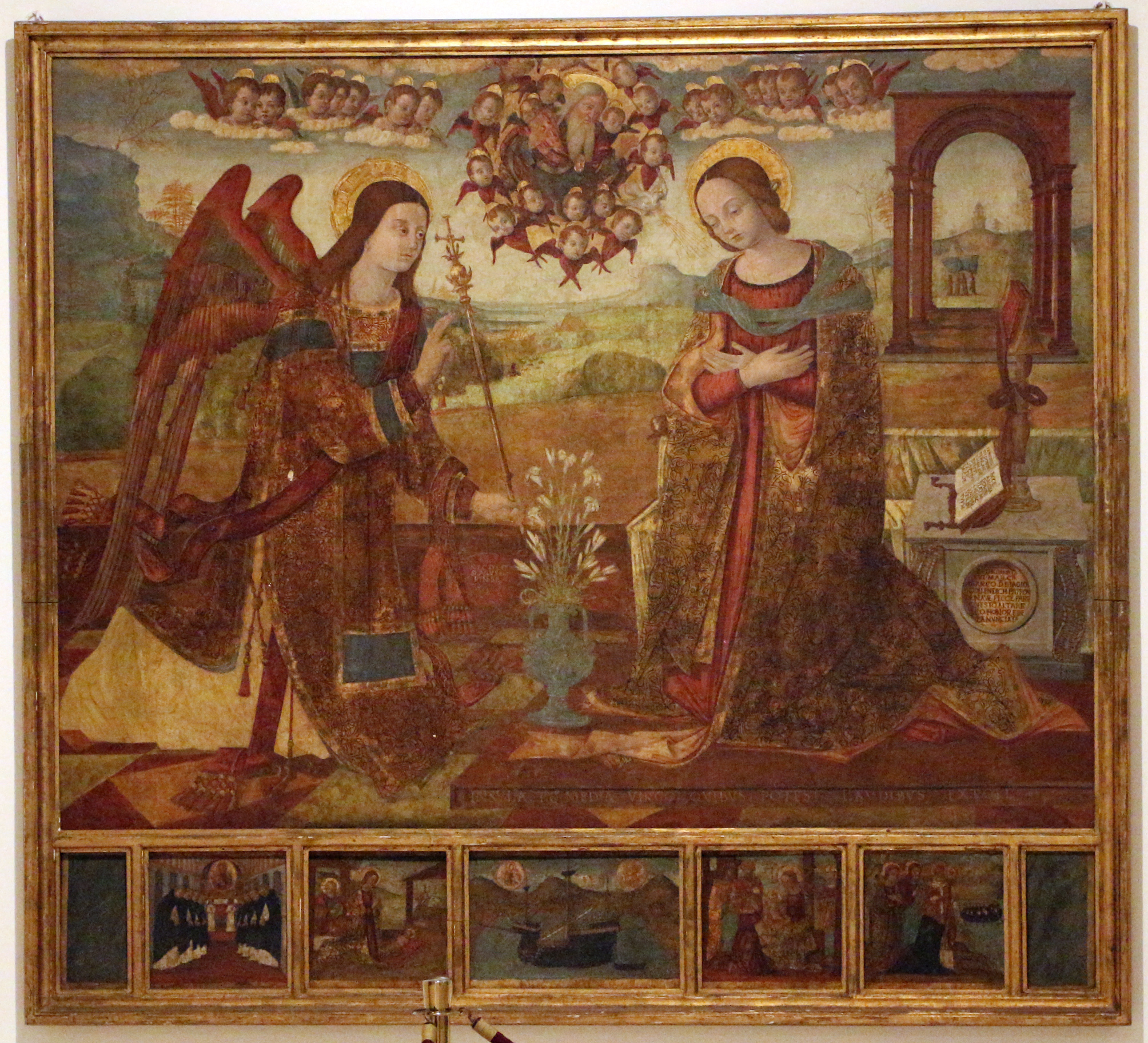
Annunciation

== See also ==
- Lovro Dobričević
- Mihajlo Hamzić
