= Nada Mandić =

Serbian politician

Nada Mandić (Serbian Cyrillic: Нада Мандић; born 1969) is a politician in Serbia. She has served in the Assembly of Vojvodina since 2016 as a member of the Serbian Progressive Party.

== Private career ==
Mandić holds a Bachelor of Science degree in Agricultural Engineering. She lives in Sombor.

== Politician ==
Mandić was elected to the village council of Kljajićevo in Sombor in February 2016, against the backdrop of an absolute victory of the Progressive Party in the community. As of 2020, she was the leader of the Progressive Party's organization in the village.

She received the thirty-fourth position on the Progressive Party's electoral list in the 2016 Vojvodina provincial election and was elected when the list won a majority victory with sixty-three out of 120 mandates. She was subsequently promoted to the eighteenth position in the 2020 provincial election and was re-elected when the list won an increased majority with seventy-six mandates. Mandić is now a member of the committee on agriculture and the committee on organization of administration and local self-government.
