= Vitus of Kotor =

Serbian architect

Vitus of Kotor, also Vito and Vita (Serbian Cyrillic: Фра Вита Трифунов Чучо(ло) Которски, romanized: Fra Vita Trifunov Čučo(lo) Kotorski, Italian: Fra Vito da Cattaro; c. 1275 – after 1335) was a Serbian architect from Kotor who is known for the construction of the Visoki Dečani monastery.

== Biography ==
He was born in Kotor, at the time part of the Kingdom of Serbia (now Montenegro) and studied construction in Kotor where he joined the Franciscan monastery and became a monk and a master-builder with his own workshop. His organizational skills and ability to gather the best craftsmen from surrounding regions, including Dubrovnik (at the time part of the Republic of Ragusa), earned him a reputation. He was personally commissioned by Serbian kings Stefan Milutin and Stefan Dečanski to build Visoki Dečani.

His full name is recorded variously by historians, Vito Trifunov (of Tryphon, referring to an ancestor) Čučola or possibly Čuča, Kotoranin (of Kotor). This is based on an inscription on the portal of the southern gate of Dečani, but only 20th century work by historians Risto Kovijanić and Ivo Stjepčević correlated the person to the records in Kotor. He also has been referred to as Vita Kuçi.

The initial construction on Visoki Dečani Monastery occurred between 1327 and 1335 during the reign of Stefan Dečanski. The monastery is situated in the valley of the Bistrica river surrounded by the mountains and forests of the Prokletije mountain range in Kosovo. Today's analysis of the sculpture and architecture of Dečani offers many clues to the authorship of sculptures of saints and a mausoleum in Banjska and series of churches in Kotor (including a basilica) of the 14th century that is attributable to Fra Vito from Kotor who built a similar mausoleum in Dečani.

Vitus is credited for the construction of the monastery church at Dečani which began in early 1327. The church was dedicated to Christ Pantocrator. King Stefan Dečanski commissioned the construction to a group of master-builders headed by master Vitus of Kotor and under the supervision of Archbishop, later Saint, Danilo II. In 1330, Stefan Dečanski granted a charter for the monastery with an endowment to support the monastery in perpetuity. Stefan's remains are preserved in the Dečani church in a coffin at the head of the altar.

He died in Kotor.
