= Visoki Dečani =

Serbian Orthodox Monastery near Deçan, Kosovo

Visoki Dečani Monastery Dečani Monastery
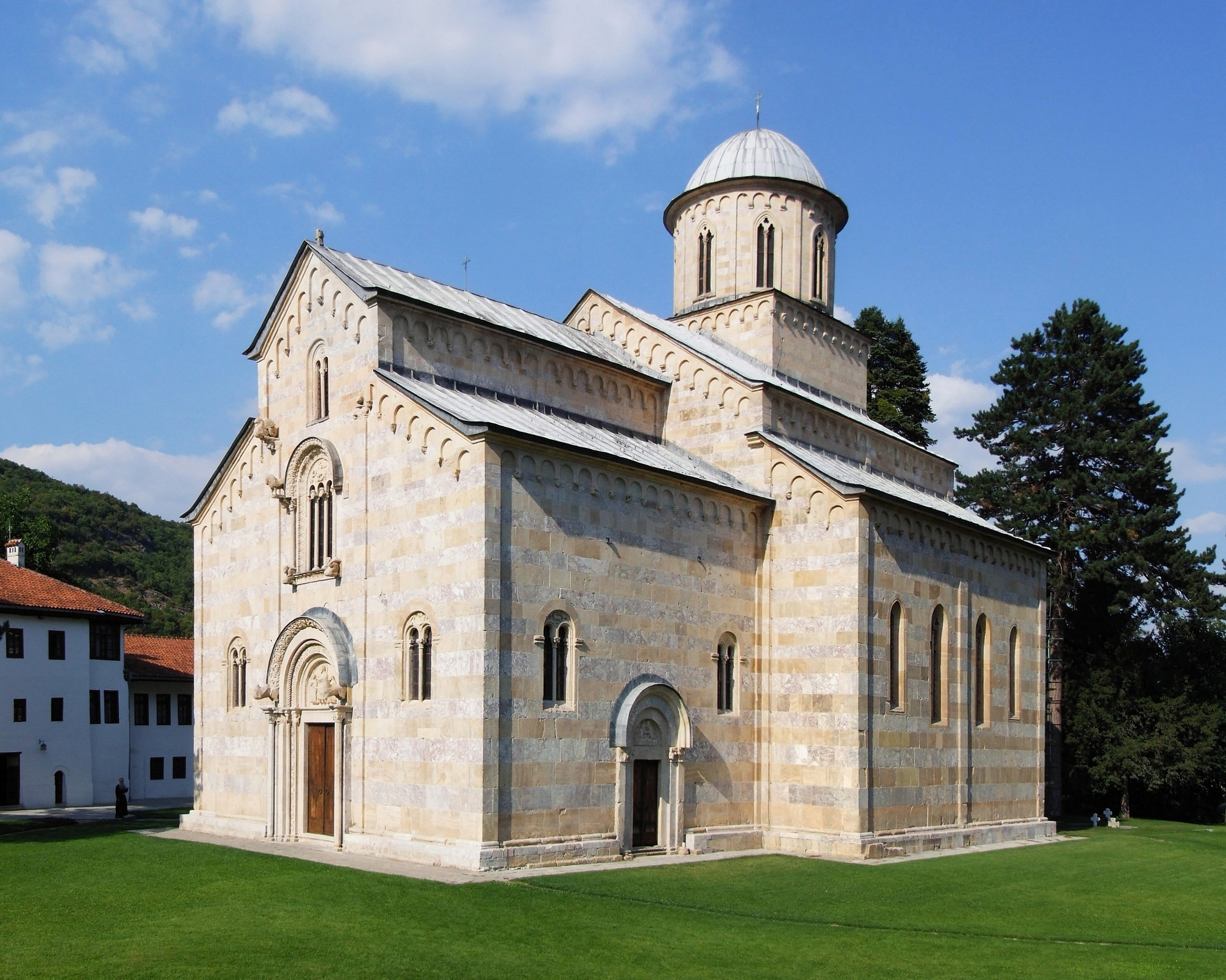
- Visoki Dečani Church

- Location of Visoki Dečani within Kosovo

Monastery information
- Order: Serbian Orthodox
- Established: 1327–35
- Diocese: Eparchy of Raška and Prizren

People
- Founder: King Stefan Dečanski
- Abbot: Sava Janjić
- Important associated figures: Stefan Dečanski, Stefan Dušan

Architecture
- Architect: Vito of Kotor
- Style: Serbo-Byzantine style

Site
- Location: Deçan, Kosovo; 661 m (2,168.6 ft)
- Coordinates: 42°32′48.9984″N 20°15′57.999″E
- Public access: yes
- Website: https://www.decani.org

UNESCO World Heritage Site
- Type: Cultural
- Criteria: ii, iii, iv
- Designated: 2004 (28th session)
- Part of: Medieval Monuments in Kosovo
- Reference no.: 724
- Region: Europe and North America

Cultural Heritage of Serbia
- Official name: Manastir Dečani
- Type: Monument of Culture of Exceptional Importance
- Designated: 1947
- Reference no.: SК 1368

The Visoki Dečani Monastery (Serbian: Манастир Високи Дечани, romanized: Manastir Visoki Dečani; Albanian: Kisha Deçanit) is a medieval Serbian Orthodox Christian monastery located near Deçan, Kosovo. It was founded in the first half of the 14th century by Stefan Dečanski, King of Serbia.

Dečani is by far the largest medieval church in the Balkans. Its architectural style, which emerged in Kingdom of Serbia at the end of the 12th century, combines Orthodox traditions with Romanesque influences and is regarded as one of the most complex architectural achievements of the 14th century. The monastery reflects the cultural exchange between the East and West, representing Serbia's historical position during the medieval period. The Dečani church contains frescos that show defining moments from both Serbian history and Christian tradition. It also features the largest preserved collection of Byzantine painting. For centuries, Dečani has played a key role in preserving the spiritual, cultural, and national identity of Serbs in Kosovo.

Dečani is often considered to be one of the most endangered European cultural heritage sites. The monastery has been under the legal protection of Serbia since 1947 and is part of the World Heritage list titled "Medieval Monuments in Kosovo", designated as a Cultural Monument of Exceptional Importance.

== History ==
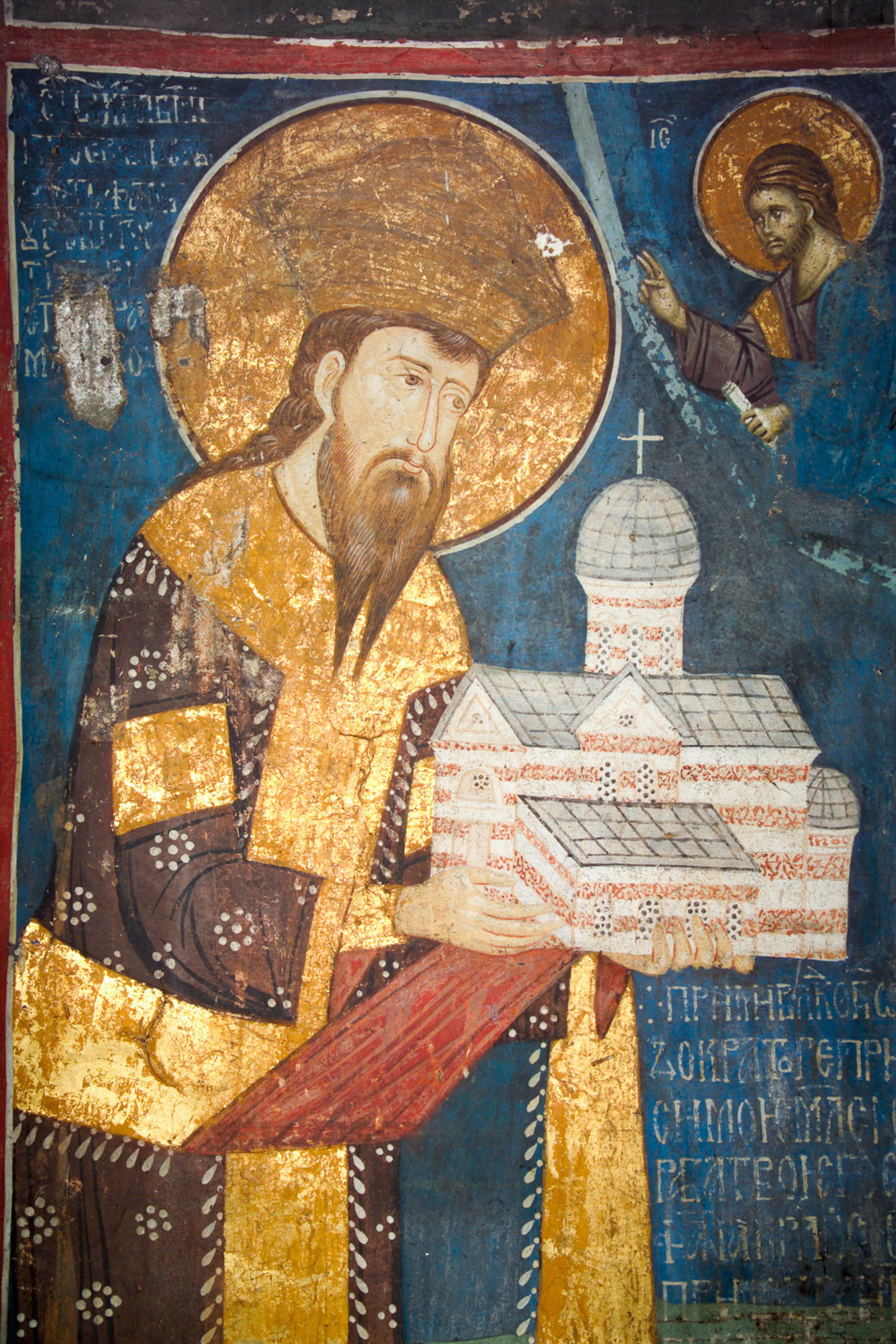
Fresco of Stefan Dečanski, the king of Serbia and founder of Visoki Dečani monastery

The region of Dečani had a long ecclesiastical history. Since the beginning of the 11th century, it belonged to the Eparchy of Prizren, under the jurisdiction of the Archbishopric of Ohrid. In 1219, the Archbishopric of Žiča was created in the medieval Kingdom of Serbia, and northern parts of the Eparchy of Prizren were reorganized as the new Eparchy of Hvosno. Such ecclesiastical order was as well in place in the first half of the 14th century, and thus also at the time when establishment of the Dečani monastery was initiated.

The construction of the monastery began during the reign of the Serbian King Stefan Dečanski, in 1327. The original founding charter from 1330, also known as the Dečani chrysobull, has been preserved to this day. After his death in 1331, Stefan Dečanski was buried in the still unfinished monastery, the construction of which was continued by his son Stefan Dušan, who became the King of Serbia in the same year. The main architect of the monastery was the Franciscan friar Vito of Kotor. According to Bratislav Pantelić, the monastic church displays some features of Gothic architecture, Byzantine-Romanesque architecture and contains Byzantine style fresco paintings and numerous Romanesque sculptures, part of a "Palaeologan renaissance".

The construction of the monastery lasted for a total of 8 years and covered an area of 4000 square meters. The outstanding artistic quality of the paintings took 15 years and were done by painters with origins from Serbia, Byzantine and Adriatic coast. The wooden throne of the hegumen (monastery head) was finished at around this time, and the church interior was decorated. Dečanski's carved wooden sarcophagus was finished in 1340. Those who contributed to the construction of the monastery were collectively gifted a village close to the city of Prizren named Manastirica, where many settled following completion. Serbian princess and Bulgarian empress consort Ana-Neda (d. ca. 1350) was buried in the church.

During the Middle Ages, entire Albanian villages were gifted by Serbian kings, particularly Stefan Dušan, as presents to the Serbian monastery of Visoki Dečani, as well as those of Prizren and Tetovo. Bulgarian writer Gregory Tsamblak, author of the Life of Stefan Dečanski, was the hegumen (monastery head) at the beginning of the 15th century.

=== Under Ottoman rule ===
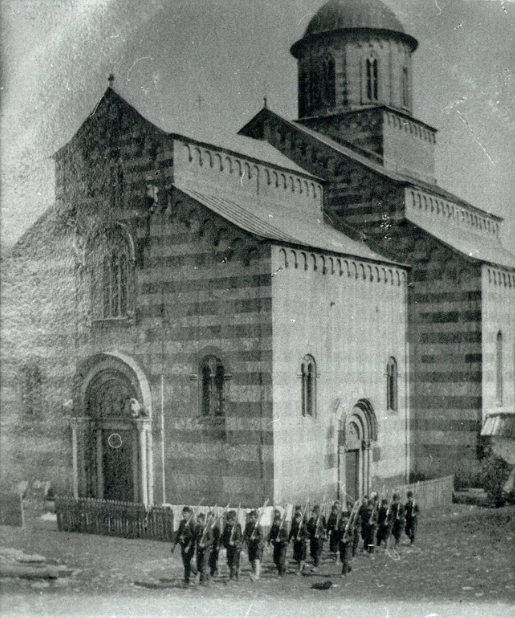
The Turkish army guarding Visoki Dečani, around 1904.

In the middle of the 15th century, the region was conquered by the Ottoman Empire, but the monastery continued to exist. In 1557, the Serbian Patriarchate of Peć war renewed, encompassing the region, and thus the monastery remained under its jurisdiction until the abolition of the Patriarchate in 1766. From that time, the region was under jurisdiction of the Patriarchate of Constantinople.

The painter-monk Longin spent two decades in the monastery during the second half of the 16th century and created 15 icons with depictions of the Great Feasts and hermits, as well as his most celebrated work, the icon of Stefan Dečanski. In the late 17th century, the Ottomans plundered the monastery, but inflicted no serious damage. In 1819, archimandrite Zaharija Dečanac became Metropolitan of Raška and Prizren. During this period under Ottoman rule, there was a tradition of Albanians protecting the monastery. However, mostly due to external pressures accelerating the divide between Albanian Muslims and Serbian Christians, the tradition began to largely wane by 1898, and attacks by Albanian clansmen occurred several times in the following years.

=== 20th and 21st century ===
Following the end of the First Balkan War, the monastery fell within the administration of the Kingdom of Montenegro. The then King Nikola I of Montenegro placed much of the surrounding land under the monastery's jurisdiction. During World War I, the monastery's treasures were plundered by the Austro-Hungarian Army, which occupied Serbia between 1915 and 1918. The monastery fell within the territory of the Italian-ruled Albanian Kingdom during World War II, and was targeted for destruction by the Albanian nationalist Balli Kombëtar and Italian fascist blackshirts in mid-1941. The Royal Italian Army responded by sending a group of soldiers to help protect the monastery from attack.

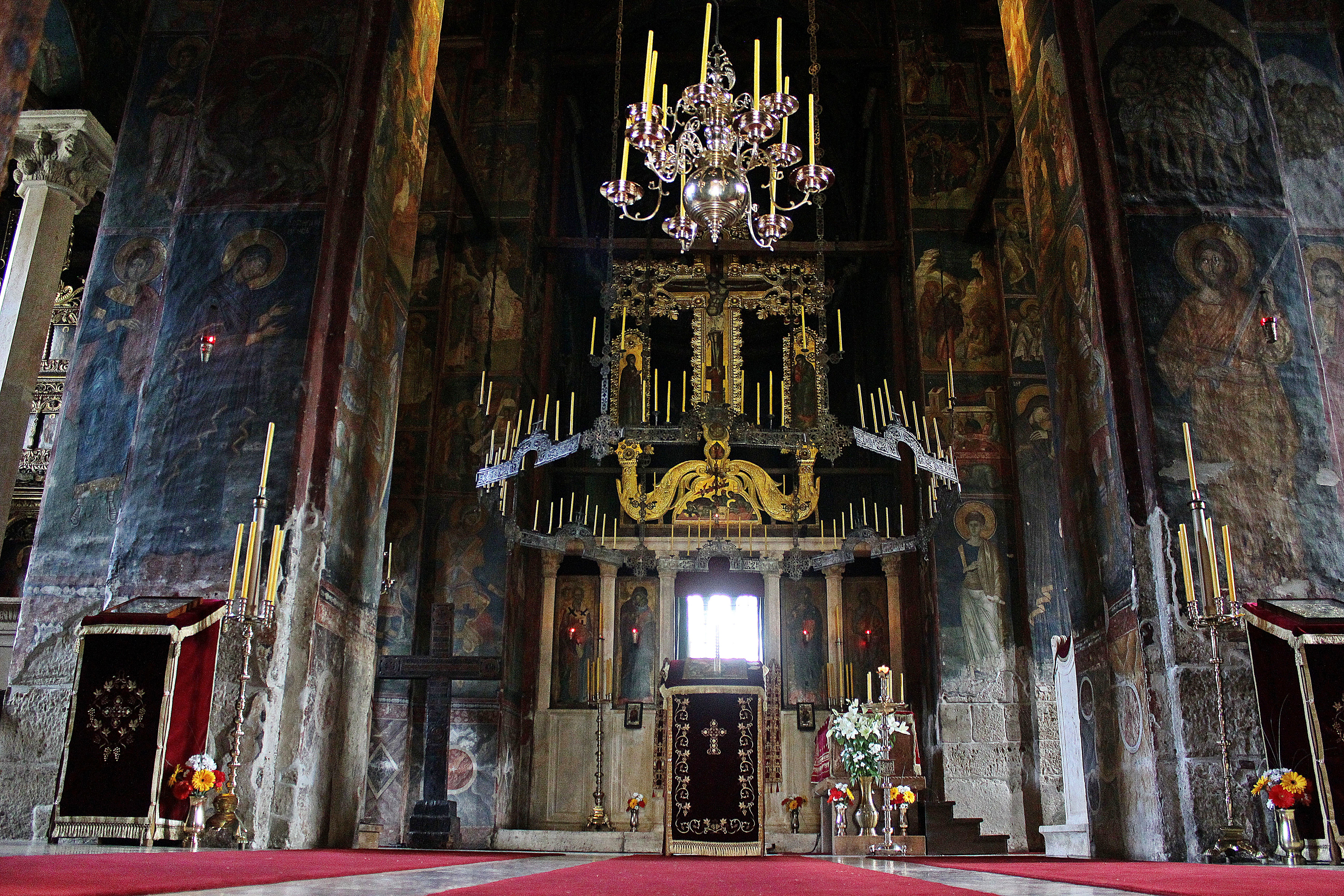
Interior

The monastic treasure was exhibited in the rebuilt medieval refectory in 1987. The monastery's monks sheltered refugees of all ethnicities during the Kosovo War, which lasted from March 1998 to June 1999. On 7 May 1998, the corpses of two elderly Albanians were found 400 metres (1,300 ft) from the monastery. They were reportedly killed by the Kosovo Liberation Army (KLA) for allegedly collaborating with Serbian forces. The KLA staged an attack not far from the monastery on 8 May, killing one person and wounding four others. That evening, Deçan's 300 remaining Serbs came to the monastery to seek shelter.

Albanian civilians seeking refuge in the monastery returned to their homes following the withdrawal of Serbian military from Kosovo in June 1999. An Italian unit of the Kosovo Force (KFOR) was subsequently assigned to guard the monastery, which was attacked on several occasions. Dozens of Romanis sought sanctuary in the monastery over the next several months, fearing retaliatory attacks by their Albanian neighbours, who accused them of collaborating with the Serbs and looting Albanian homes.

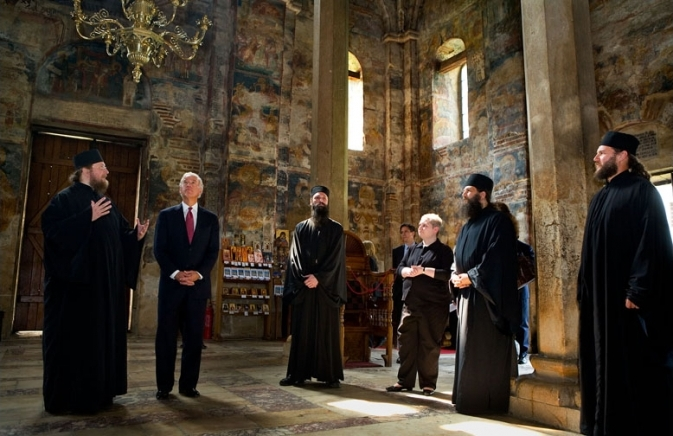
Joe Biden, then Vice President of the United States, on a tour of the Visoki Dečani in 2009

During the violent unrest in Kosovo on 17 March 2004, KFOR defended the monastery from an Albanian mob trying to throw Molotov cocktails at it. Several Albanians were shot and wounded in the clash. On 2 July 2004, the monastery was declared a World Heritage Site by the United Nations Educational, Scientific and Cultural Organization (UNESCO). UNESCO cited it as "an irreplaceable treasure, a place where traditions of Romanesque architecture meet artistic patterns of the Byzantine world." The monastery, along with all other Serbian Medieval Monuments in Kosovo, was added to the UNESCO list of endangered World Heritage sites in 2006.

Suspected Kosovo Albanian insurgents hurled hand grenades at the monastery on 30 March 2007, but caused little damage. In recent years, the situation around the monastery has stabilized and it has reopened to visitors. Serbian President Boris Tadić attended a service at the monastery in April 2009. U.S. Vice President Joe Biden visited the monastery the following month. In its annual International Religious Freedom Report for the year 2020, the State Department wrote that the Deçan municipal officials continued to refuse to implement a 2016 Constitutional Court decision upholding the Supreme Court’s 2012 ruling recognizing the monastery’s ownership of approximately 24 hectares of land.

On 20 March 2024, the government of Kosovo returned the 24 hectares of contested land of the monastery to the Serbian Orthodox Church as directed by the Constitutional Court of Kosovo, ending an eight-year dispute. Kosovo Prime Minister Albin Kurti implemented the decision in response to pressure from the Council of Europe, who had made its implementation a precondition for Kosovo's membership application to be considered.

== Architecture ==
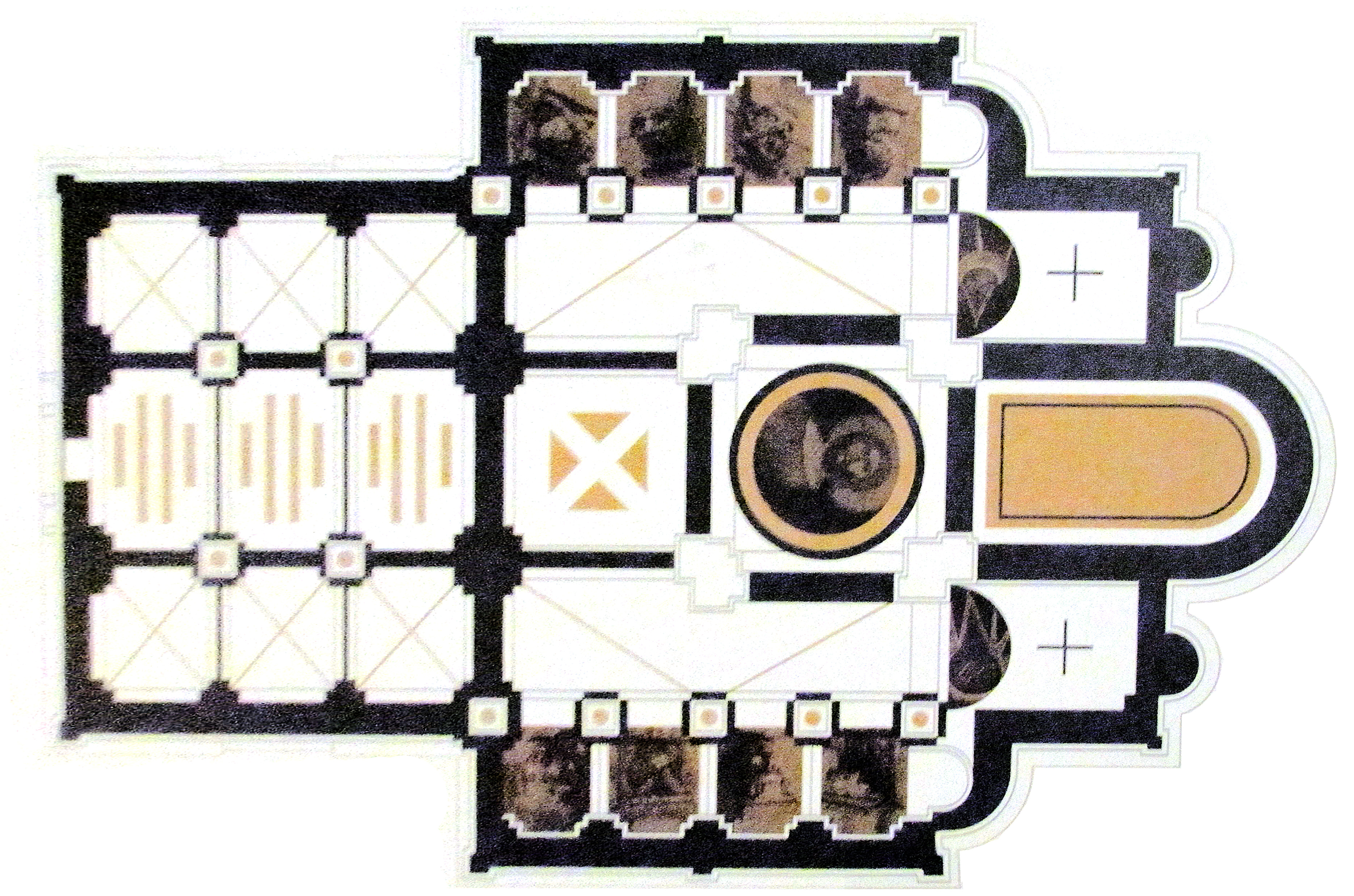
Аrchitectural plan of the monastery

Because of the dimensions of the church, which by far surpass the size of all the other medieval Balkan churches, the monastery has been popularly named High Dečani. The church has five-nave naos, a three-part iconostasis, and a three-nave parvise. With the dome, it is 26 m high. Its outer walls are done in alternate layers of white and pink marble. The portals, windows, consoles, and capitals are richly decorated. Christ the Judge is shown surrounded by angels in the western part of the church. Its twenty major cycles of fresco murals represent the largest preserved gallery of Serbian medieval art, featuring over 1000 compositions and several thousand portraits.

== Heritage site in danger ==
Dečani Monastery is one of four World Heritage medieval monuments in Kosovo designated as a heritage site in danger. Since the arrival of KFOR peacekeepers in the region in 1999, attacks on the Monastery have increased. Since 1999 there have been five significant attacks and near miss attacks on the monastery:

- 27 February 2000 – Six grenades hit the Decani Monastery.
- 22 June 2000 – Nine grenades hit the Decani Monastery.
- 17 March 2004 – Seven grenades fell around the monastery walls. This attack formed part of the 2004 unrest in Kosovo.
- 30 March 2007 – One grenade hit the wall behind the church.
- 1 February 2016 – Four armed suspects in a motor vehicle were detained at the gates of the monastery. A search of their car found an assault rifle, pistol, ammunition and extremist Islamist printed material. It is unclear whether there is any connection between the case of Decani and an earlier attack in a mosque in Drenas. Dusan Kozarev, member of government of Serbia had claimed a year earlier that the monastery gates were painted with graffiti that read "ISIS", "Caliphate is coming" and "UÇK".

In 2021, Europa Nostra listed Visoki Dečani as one of the seven most endangered cultural heritage sites in Europe.

As of 2023, Dečani Monastery has a 24/7 guard from KFOR. Of the four medieval monuments in Kosovo that are designated as a heritage site in danger, Dečani is the only one with a direct guard from KFOR.

== In popular culture ==
Visoki Dečani, three episodes of the documentary series "Witnesses of Times" produced by the broadcasting service RTB in 1989 was created by Gordana Babić and Petar Savković, directed by Dragoslav Bokan, music was composed by Zoran Hristić.

== See also ==
- List of Serbian Orthodox monasteries

== Sources ==
- "Serbian president visits Kosovo". BBC. 17 April 2009.
- Bop, Ogist (2017). Za srpskom vladom od Niša do Krfa. Belgrade: Čigoja. ISBN 978-86-531-0069-8.
- Burke, Kathleen (March 2009). "Visoki Decani Monastery, Kosovo: A Medieval Refuge". Smithsonian Magazine. Vol. 39, no. 12. pp. 46–47.
- Ćirković, Sima (2004). The Serbs. Malden: Blackwell Publishing.
- Elsie, Robert (2010). Historical Dictionary of Kosovo. Lanham, Maryland: Rowman & Littlefield. ISBN 978-0-8108-7483-1.
- Fine, John Van Antwerp Jr. (1994) [1987]. The Late Medieval Balkans: A Critical Survey from the Late Twelfth Century to the Ottoman Conquest. Ann Arbor, MI: University of Michigan Press.
- Judah, Tim (2000). The Serbs: History, Myth and the Destruction of Yugoslavia (2nd ed.). New Haven, Connecticut: Yale University Press. ISBN 978-0-300-08507-5.
- Judah, Tim (2002). Kosovo: War and Revenge. New Haven, Connecticut: Yale University Press. ISBN 978-0-300-09725-2.
- Katić, Tatjana; Vučetić, Biljana (2017). "In the time of the Ottoman Empire (1455-1912)" (PDF). Artistic Heritage of the Serbian People in Kosovo and Metohija: History, Identity, Vulnerability, Protection. Belgrade: Serbian Academy of Sciences and Arts. pp. 365–377. Archived from the original on 25 January 2025.
- King, Ian; Mason, Whit (2006). Peace at Any Price: How the World Failed Kosovo. Ithaca, New York: Cornell University Press. ISBN 978-0-8014-4539-2.
- Mitrović, Andrej (2007). Serbia's Great War, 1914–1918. West Lafayette, Indiana: Purdue University Press. ISBN 978-1-55753-477-4.
- Novak, Viktor (1954). Историјски часопис 4 (1952-1953). Yugoslavia: Istorijski institut.
- Pantelić, Bratislav (2002). The Architecture of Dečani and the Role of Archbishop Danilo II. Wiesbaden: Reichert. ISBN 9783895002397.
- Popović, Svetlana (2002). "The Serbian Episcopal sees in the thirteenth century". Starinar. 51 (2001): 171–184.
- Sotirović, Vladislav B. (2011). "The Serbian Patriarchate of Peć in the Ottoman Empire: The First Phase (1557–94)" (PDF). Serbian Studies. 25 (2): 143–169. Archived from the original (PDF) on 10 August 2016.
- Tanner, Adam (22 May 2009). "Biden visit to Kosovo monastery splits Serbian Orthodox Church". Reuters. Archived from the original on 29 May 2009.
- "Medieval Monuments in Kosovo". UNESCO. 2006.
- "Dečani (Serbia–Montenegro)" (PDF). World Heritage Committee. 2003.
- "2019 Report on International Religious Freedom: Kosovo". United States Department of State. 2020.
- "Visoki Dečani". Serbian Academy of Sciences and Arts. 2006.
