= Manastirica, Prizren =

Manastirica Manastirica (Bosnian) Манастирица (Serbian) Manastiricë (Albanian)
- Village
- Location in Kosovo
- Coordinates: 42°08′06″N 20°48′19″E
- Location: Kosovo
- District: Prizren
- Municipality: Prizren

Population (2024)
  - Total: 1,030
- Time zone: UTC+1 (CET)
  - Summer (DST): UTC+2 (CEST)

Manastirica (Serbian Cyrillic: Манастирица; Albanian: Manastiricë; Bosnian: Manastirica) is a village in the Prizren Municipality in southern Kosovo, close to the border between Kosovo and North Macedonia.

== History ==
The village of Manastirica was settled by construction workers who took part in the construction of the Visoki Dečani Monastery in the early 1300s. As a sign of gratitude for their work, these workers were gifted the village of Manastirica to settle by the Serbian king Stefan Dečanski following completion of the build.

== Demographics ==
The village is almost exclusively inhabited by Bosniaks.
