= Aleksandar Mandić =

Serbian politician

Aleksandar Mandić (Serbian Cyrillic: Александар Мандић; born 1988) is a politician in Serbia. He has served in the Assembly of Vojvodina since 2020 as a member of the Serbian Progressive Party.

== Private career ==
Mandić has a bachelor's degree in economics. He lives in Pećinci.

== Politician ==
Mandić was president of the village council of Šimanovci in Pećinci prior to his election to the provincial legislature.

He was given the fifty-eighth position on the Progressive-led Aleksandar Vučić — For Our Children electoral list in the 2020 Vojvodina provincial election and was elected when the list won a majority victory with seventy-six out of 120 mandates. He now is a member of the committee on national equality and the committee on organization of administration and local self-government.
