= Zakučac =

Settlement in Split-Dalmatia County, Croatia

- Settlement
- Interactive map of Zakučac
- Location of Zakučac in Croatia
- Coordinates: 43°27′14″N 16°41′46″E
- Country: Croatia
- County: Split-Dalmatia
- City: Omiš

Area
  - Total: 2.6 km^{2} (1.0 sq mi)

Population (2021)
  - Total: 156
  - Density: 60/km^{2} (160/sq mi)
- Time zone: UTC+1 (CET)
  - Summer (DST): UTC+2 (CEST)
- Postal code: 21310 Omiš
- Area code: +385 (0)21

Zakučac is a settlement in the City of Omiš in Croatia. In 2021, its population was 156.

== Demographics ==
Zakučac: Population trends 1857–2021
v

population	113	132	144	156	180	184	176	228	218	206	1045	259	181	159	153	148	156
	1857	1869	1880	1890	1900	1910	1921	1931	1948	1953	1961	1971	1981	1991	2001	2011	2021

Sources: Croatian Bureau of Statistics publications

== Religion ==
There is Sanctuary of Saint Leopold Bogdan Mandić, who is patron saint of the place.
