= Slavko Mandić =

Serbian-born Croatian footballer

Personal information
- Full name: Slavko Mandić
- Date of birth: 4 January 1972 (age 54)
- Place of birth: Tavankut, SR Serbia, SFR Yugoslavia
- Height: 1.87 m (6 ft 1 1/2 in)
- Position: Defender

Youth career
- 1984–198x: Bačka Subotica

Senior career*
Years	Team	Apps	(Gls)
198x–199x	Bačka Subotica		
199x–1998	Spartak Subotica		
1998–1999	Bor		
2000	Osijek	1	(0)
2001	Zadar	1	(0)
2001	ŁKS Łódź	9	(0)
2002	Rudar Ugljevik		
2004	RoPS	19	(0)
2005	KS Siglufjörður	6	(0)
- * Club domestic league appearances and goals

Slavko Mandić (Serbian Cyrillic: Славко Мандић; born 4 January 1972) is a Serbian-born Croatian former professional footballer who played as a defender.

== Club career ==
Born in Tavankut, SR Serbia, back in Yugoslavia, Slavko Mandić started playing with FK Bačka 1901 youth team in 1984, and by the 1990–91 season he was already in the first-team. After Bačka, he joined the major club in the city, FK Spartak Subotica, having played with them in the 1997–98 First League of FR Yugoslavia. He then played with FK Bor in the 1998–99 Second League of FR Yugoslavia. He played the 2000–01 season in the Croatian First League, first half-season with NK Osijek, second with NK Zadar. The next season, he played the first half with ŁKS Łódź in Polish second level, I Liga, and the second with FK Rudar Ugljevik in the First League of the Republika Srpska. He then played with finish side RoPS in the 2005 Veikkausliiga and in 2006 with Icelandic lower-league side KS Siglufjörður.
