= Dragunja Donja =

- Village
- Location within Bosnia and Herzegovina
- Coordinates: 44.6268575°N 18.5970117°E
- Country: Bosnia and Herzegovina
- Entity: Federation of Bosnia and Herzegovina
- Canton: Tuzla
- Municipality: Tuzla

Area
  - Total: 1.58 sq mi (4.09 km^{2})

Population (2013)
  - Total: 236
  - Density: 149/sq mi (57.7/km^{2})
- Time zone: UTC+1 (CET)
  - Summer (DST): UTC+2 (CEST)

Dragunja Donja is a village in the municipality of Tuzla, Tuzla Canton, Bosnia and Herzegovina.

== Demographics ==
According to the 2013 census, its population was 236.

Ethnicity in 2013
Ethnicity	Number	Percentage
Croats	189	80.1%
Bosniaks	29	12.3%
Serbs	1	0.4%
other/undeclared	17	7.2%
Total	236	100%
