= Jake Allex =

United States Army Medal of Honor recipient (1887–1959)

Jake Allex Mandusich
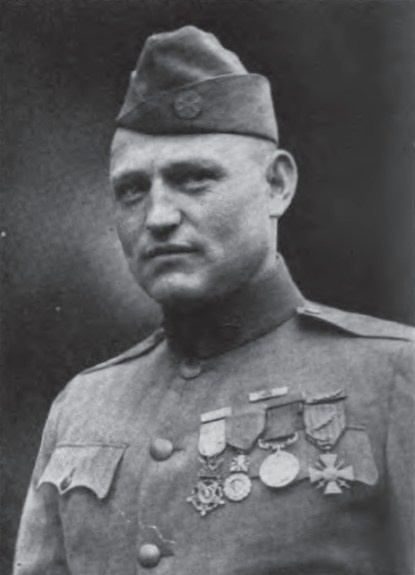
- Jake Allex Mandusich, Medal of Honor recipient
- Born: Aleksa Mandušić; July 13, 1887; Prizren, Kosovo Vilayet, Ottoman Empire
- Died: August 28, 1959 (aged 72); Chicago, Illinois, U.S.
- Burial place: Saint Sava Serbian Orthodox Monastery cemetery, Libertyville, Illinois
- Military career
- Allegiance: United States
- Branch: United States Army
- Rank: Sergeant
- Service number: 1387815
- Units: Company H, 131st Infantry, 33rd Infantry Division
- Conflicts: World War I: Battle of Amiens
- Awards: Medal of Honor

Aleksa Mandušić (Serbian Cyrillic: Алекса Мандушић; July 13, 1887 – August 28, 1959) was a Serbian-American soldier who received the Medal of Honor for his service in the U.S. Army during World War I. He was also known as Jake Allex Mandusich or simply Jake Allex.

== Military service ==
Allex entered the U.S. Army in Chicago, Illinois, and returned there following World War I with the rank of Sergeant. While in the Army, he served in Company H, 131st Infantry, 33rd Infantry Division.

In early August 1918, the rapid Allied advance during the Battle of Amiens ran into a very serious impediment in "a bare seventy-five-foot-high ridge" in an oxbow bend of the Somme River near Chipilly, which was still in German hands. The German soldiers on Chipilly Ridge commanded a wide field of fire to the south of the Somme, and poured devastating machine gun and artillery fire that kept the Australian Corps pinned down across the river at Hamel. The job of taking Chipilly Ridge was ultimately assigned to 3 battalions of American Doughboys from the U.S. 33rd Division.

According to B.J. Omanson, "Their attack took place at 5:30 p.m. and, despite heavy machine gun and artillery fire pouring down on them from Chipilly Ridge, the Americans could not be driven back. They repeatedly pressed the assault until the northern half of the ridge and southern end of nearby Gressaire Wood were taken. Continuing the assault the following day, they took the rest of Gressaire Wood and by day's end were in possession of seven hundred German prisoners, thirty artillery pieces, one aircraft, and more than one hundred machine guns."

On August 9, 1918, during the attack on Chipilly Ridge, when finding all of his officers either wounded or killed and his platoon under heavy attack from the opposing German forces Allex, a Corporal, took command. Leading his platoon forward toward the machine gun nest, his platoon was able to overwhelm the opposition. He personally killed five enemy soldiers. When his bayonet broke, he used the butt of his rifle in close-quarters. Corporal Allex personally took fifteen German prisoners. Little is known about his life following the First World War.

He died August 28, 1959, in a Veterans Administration hospital in Chicago. He lies buried in the cemetery of the Saint Sava Serbian Orthodox Monastery in the Chicago suburb of Libertyville, Illinois.

== Medal of Honor Citation ==
Rank and organization: Corporal, U.S. Army, Company H, 131st Infantry, 33d Division. Place and date: At Chippilly Ridge, France, August 9, 1918. Entered service at: Chicago, Ill. Born: July 13, 1887, Prizren, Kosovo. General Orders: War Department, General Orders No. 44 (April 2, 1919).

Citation:

At a critical point in the action, when all the officers with his platoon had become casualties, Cpl. Allex took command of the platoon and led it forward until the advance was stopped by fire from a machinegun nest. He then advanced alone for about 30 yards in the face of intense fire and attacked the nest. With his bayonet he killed 5 of the enemy, and when it was broken, used the butt of his rifle, capturing 15 prisoners.

== Military awards ==
Allex's military decorations and awards include:

1st row	Medal of Honor		
2nd row	World War I Victory Medal w/three bronze service stars to denote credit for the Somme Offensive, Meuse-Argonne and Defensive Sector battle clasps.	Distinguished Conduct Medal (Great Britain)	Médaille militaire (French Republic)
3rd row	Croix de guerre 1914–1918 w/bronze palm (French Republic)	Croix de guerre w/ bronze palm (Belgium)	Croce al Merito di Guerra (Italy)
4th row	Medal for Military Bravery (Kingdom of Montenegro)	Орден Карађорђеве звезде with swords Fourth Class (Kingdom of Serbia)	Медаља Милоша Обилића in Gold (Kingdom of Serbia)

== See also ==
- List of Medal of Honor recipients
- List of Medal of Honor recipients for World War I
