= Immovable Cultural Heritage of Exceptional Importance (Serbia) =

Heritage protection classification in Serbia

Immovable Cultural Heritage of Exceptional Importance (Serbian: Непокретна културна добра од изузетног значаја/Nepokretna kulturna dobra od izuzetnog značaja) are those objects of Immovable cultural heritage that enjoy the highest level of state protection in the Republic of Serbia. Immovable Cultural Heritage is classified as being of Exceptional Importance upon decision by the National Assembly of Serbia. They are inscribed in the Central Register of Immovable cultural property maintained by the Institute for the Protection of Cultural Monuments of Serbia. Objects of Immovable cultural heritage have to fulfill one or more of those criteria defined in the Law on Cultural Heritage of 1994 in order to be categorized as being "of exceptional importance":

1. exceptional importance for social, historical or cultural development of the people, or for the development of its natural environment;
2. evidence of important historic events or persons and their work;
3. unique (rare) example of human creativity of the time or a unique example from the natural history;
4. great influence on the development of society, culture, technology, or science;
5. exceptional artistic or aesthetic value.

According to the Law, there are four classes of Immovable Cultural Heritage: Cultural Monuments, Archaeological Sites, Historic Landmarks and Spatial Cultural-Historical Units. Objects in each of those classes can be categorized as being "of exceptional importance" by the National Assembly.

== List of Cultural Heritage of Exceptional Importance ==
As of July 2020, there are currently 2592 objects of immovable cultural heritage inscribed in the Central Register, 200 of which are categorized as being "of exceptional importance" (155 cultural monuments, 18 archaeological sites, 16 historic landmarks and 11 spatial cultural-historical units).

Key
^{*}	Those sites are located in the disputed territory of Kosovo.

=== Cultural monuments of Exceptional Importance ===
Number in the Central Register	Picture	Name	City/Municipality	Location address	designated cultural heritage	Exceptional importance since	Comment
SK 1		Dositej's Lyceum	Belgrade / Stari Grad	Belgrade; Gospodar Jevremova St. no. 21	10 August 1946	7 April 1979	
SK 2		Residence of Princess Ljubica	Belgrade / Stari Grad	Belgrade; Sime Markovića St. no. 8	5 September 1946	7 April 1979	
SK 3		Belgrade Fortress	Belgrade / Stari Grad	Belgrade; Kalemegdan gornji grad nn	31 May 1965	7 April 1979	
SK 5		Residence of Prince Miloš	Belgrade / Stari Grad	Belgrade; Rakovački put St. no. 2	2 December 1946	7 April 1979 (cluster "Complex of the Residence of Prince Miloš")	
SK 6		Church of the Holy Apostles Peter and Paul, Topčider	Belgrade / Savski Venac	Belgrade; Vojvode Putnika St. no. 11	2 December 1946	7 April 1979 (cluster "Complex of the Residence of Prince Miloš")	
SK 7		Parish House in Topčider	Belgrade / Savski Venac	Belgrade; Vojvode Putnika St. no. 11	2 December 1946	7 April 1979 (cluster "Complex of the Residence of Prince Miloš")	
SK 56		Obelisk in Topčider Park	Belgrade / Savski Venac	Belgrade; Topčider Park	28 May 1965	7 April 1979 (cluster "Complex of the Residence of Prince Miloš")	
SK 12		Captain Miša Mansion	Belgrade / Stari Grad	Belgrade; Studentski Square no. 1	4 November 1974	7 April 1979	
SK 52		Museum of 4 July Building	Belgrade / Savski Venac	Belgrade; Bulevar Oktobarske revolucije (Bulevar kneza Aleksandra Karađorđevića) no. 10	17 May 1965	7 April 1979	
SK 54		Secret Partisan Print Shop	Belgrade / Savski Venac	Belgrade; Rajka Mitića St. no. 12 (formerly Banjički venac St.)	18 May 1965	7 April 1979	
SK 82		Memorial Church in Lazarevac	Belgrade / Lazarevac	Lazarevac	7 November 1966	7 April 1979	
SK 97		Cathedral of Saint Archangel Michael	Belgrade / Stari Grad	Belgrade; Kneza Sime Markovića St. no. 3	25 March 1968	7 April 1979	
SK 128		Despot Stefan Lazarević Memorial	Belgrade / Mladenovac	Markovac Crkvine	3 December 1974	7 April 1979	
SK 140		Manasija monastery	Despotovac	Despotovac	5 March 1948	7 April 1979	
SK 155		Đurđevi Stupovi	Novi Pazar	Vrbolazi	26 August 1947	7 April 1979	World Heritage Site "Stari Ras and Sopoćani"
SK 156		Sopoćani	Novi Pazar	Doljani	26 August 1947	7 April 1979	World Heritage Site "Stari Ras and Sopoćani"
SK 182		Petrova Church	Novi Pazar	Novi Pazar	18 December 1948	7 April 1979	World Heritage Site "Stari Ras and Sopoćani"
SK 534		Stari Ras	Novi Pazar	Bubregovići, Sebečevo	22 August 1947	7 April 1979	World Heritage Site "Stari Ras and Sopoćani"
SK 157		Lazarica with Kruševac Fortress	Kruševac	Kruševac	9 September 1947	7 April 1979	
SK 158		Studenica monastery	Kraljevo	Brezova	23 October 1947	7 April 1979	World Heritage Site
SK 159		Žiča	Kraljevo	Kruševica	25 October 1947	7 April 1979	
SK 160		Gradac monastery	Raška	Gradac	25 October 1947	7 April 1979	
SK 161		Mileševa	Prijepolje	Mileševo	23 October 1947	7 April 1979	
SK 162		St. Achillius Church (Arilje Monastery)	Arilje	Arilje	25 October 1947	7 April 1979	
SK 167		Banja Monastery	Priboj	Banja	23 February 1948	7 April 1979	
SK 168		Maglič	Kraljevo	Maglič	1 March 1948	7 April 1979	
SK 183		Ljubostinja	Trstenik	Prnjavor	22 December 1948	7 April 1979	
SK 184		Monument to the Unknown Hero	Belgrade / Voždovac	Beli Potok on Avala	18 December 1984	5 December 1987	
SK 191		Museum of 1941 Upraising (National Bank Building)	Užice	Užice; Corner of Titova St. and Heroja Dejovića St. no 18	29 April 1949 (as a single monument "Historical Buildings of Titovo Užice")	7 April 1979	Today National Museum of Užice
SK 191		Partisan printing house "Borba"	Užice	Užice; Miloša Markovića St. no. 95	29 April 1949 (as a single monument "Historical Buildings of Titovo Užice")	7 April 1979	Two buildings. Today used as the Dormitory for the Secondary School Students.
SK 191		Headquarters of the Main People's Liberation Committee of Serbia	Užice	Užice; Vuka Karadžića St. no. 8	29 April 1949 (as a single monument "Historical Buildings of Titovo Užice")	7 April 1979	Today occupied by the Music School "Vojislav-Lale Stefanović".
SK 191		Partisan Hospital	Užice	Krčagovo	29 April 1949 (as a single monument "Historical Buildings of Titovo Užice")	21 July 1983	The complex includes three buildings.
SK 191		Plant nursery	Užice	Krčagovo	29 April 1949 (as a single monument "Historical Buildings of Titovo Užice")	7 April 1979	Today used for housing.
SK 207		Church of Saint Nicolas (St. Nicholas' Monastery)	Kuršumlija	Kuršumlija	18 November 1947	7 April 1979	
SK 208		Church (Monastery) of the Holy Mother of God	Kuršumlija	Kuršumlija	18 November 1947	7 April 1979	Only the ruins remain.
SK 218		Skull Tower	Niš / Mediana	Niš; Bulevar dr Zorana Đinđića (formerly Bulevar braće Tasković) no. 78	6 May 1948	7 April 1979	
SK 223		Hajduk Veljko's Powder Magazine	Negotin	Negotin	13 March 1950	7 April 1979	Located inside the churchyard of the new Church.
SK 224		Prohor Pčinjski Monastery	Bujanovac	Klenike	23 September 1950	7 April 1979	"Prohor Pčinjski Monastery" and "Memorial Rooms in Prohor Pčinjski" were separately categorized as Monuments of Culture of Exceptional Importance. However, they are inscribed in the Central Register as one monument. Memorial rooms were dismantled in 1998 and there are no traces of them any more.
SK 224		Memorial Rooms in Prohor Pčinjski	Bujanovac	Klenike	23 September 1950	22 July 1989	"Prohor Pčinjski Monastery" and "Memorial Rooms in Prohor Pčinjski" were separately categorized as Monuments of Culture of Exceptional Importance. However, they are inscribed in the Central Register as one monument. Memorial rooms were dismantled in 1998 and there are no traces of them any more.
SK 240		Niš concentration camp (Memorial complex "12 February")	Niš / Crveni Krst	Niš; 12. februara St. nn	13 May 1977	7 April 1979	
SK 244		Ravanica	Ćuprija	Senje	5 March 1948	7 April 1979	
SK 245		Kalenić monastery	Rekovac	Kalenićki Prnjavor	10 March 1948	7 April 1979	
SK 261		Mausoleum Church in Oplenac	Topola	Topola selo	16 June 1970	7 April 1979	
SK 270		House of Svetozar Marković	Kragujevac	Kragujevac; Svetozara Markovića St. no. 21 (previously no. 23)	17 January 1948	7 April 1979	
SK 271		District Courthouse	Kragujevac	Kragujevac; Vojvode Radomira Putnika Square no. 4	5 May 1969	7 April 1979	
SK 290		Early Byzantine Tomb with Frescoes	Niš / Pantelej	Niš; Živorada Kostića Moravca St.	25 January 1949	7 April 1979	
SK 295		Old house (Hristić family House)	Pirot	Pirot; Nikole Pašića St. no.49	3 June 1970	7 April 1979	
SK 344		Sobrašice of Lužnice	Kragujevac	Lužnice	20 March 1968	7 April 1979	Located inside the churchyard.
SK 407		Church of Sts. Peter and Paul	Požega	Gornja Dobrinja	29 May 1974	7 April 1979	
SK 457		Memorial chapel with the crypt	Šabac	Prnjavor	12 December 1962	7 April 1979	
SK 483		House of Dimitrije Tucović	Čajetina	Gostilje	2 March 1950	7 April 1979	
SK 493		Partisan Hospital	Prijepolje	Prijepolje	26 January 1952	7 April 1979	Conserved remains
SK 502		Takovo complex (Wooden Church with the Second Serbian Uprising memorial)	Gornji Milanovac	Takovo	17 April 1970	7 April 1979	
SK 515		Stari Han (Moljković's Inn)	Užice	Kremna	24 August 1975	7 April 1979	The building is in the extreme state of disrepair.
SK 523		St. Peter and Paul's Church	Čajetina	Sirogojno	16 June 1980	21 July 1983	
SK 525		Wooden Church	Bajina Bašta	Dub	31 March 1981	21 July 1983	
SK 538		Smederevo fortress	Smederevo	Smederevo	8 October 1946	7 April 1979	
SK 539		Pokajnica Monastery	Velika Plana	Staro Selo	20 December 1948	7 April 1979	
SK 609		Tabula Traiana	Kladovo	Tekija	22 November 1949	7 April 1979	Part of the Roman Limes
SK 675		Wine cellar	Čačak	Atenica	19 March 1971	7 April 1979	
SK 977		Golubac Fortress	Golubac	Golubac	1 March 1948	7 April 1979	
SK 1013		Bođani monastery	Bač	Bođani	4 December 1948	3 December 1990	
SK 1014		Franciscan Cloister	Bač	Bač; Maršala Tita St. no. 10	30 May 1951	3 December 1990	
SK 1015		Dunđerski Palace	Bačka Palanka	Čelarevo Proleterska St. no. 15	7 May 1970	3 December 1990	
SK 1016		Neštin House	Bačka Palanka	Neštin; Sutjeska St. no. 27 (formerly Koče Popovića St. no. 34)	21 May 1968	3 December 1990	
SK 1017		Bački Petrovac House	Bački Petrovac	Bački Petrovac; B. Mokića St. no. 7	25 May 1965	3 December 1990	
SK 1018		Beočin monastery	Beočin	Beočin	22 November 1949	3 December 1990	
SK 1019		Rakovac monastery	Beočin	Beočin	22 November 1949	3 December 1990	
SK 1020		Mesić monastery	Vršac	Mesić	10 March 1949	3 December 1990	
SK 1021		Church of Saint Nicholas	Inđija	Stari Slankamen Stepenice	16 August 1948	3 December 1990	
SK 1022		Velika Remeta monastery	Irig	Velika Remeta	22 November 1949	3 December 1990	
SK 1023		Vrdnik-Ravanica monastery	Irig	Vrdnik	6 December 1949	3 December 1990	
SK 1024		Grgeteg monastery	Irig	Grgeteg	22 November 1949	3 December 1990	
SK 1025		Jazak monastery	Irig	Jazak	7 December 1949	3 December 1990	
SK 1026		Mala Remeta monastery	Irig	Mala Remeta	7 December 1949	3 December 1990	
SK 1027		Candlemas Church	Irig	Krušedol Selo	27 April 1957	3 December 1990	
SK 1028		Suvača	Kikinda	Kikinda; Nemanjina St. no. 118 (corner of Moravska and Nemanjina streets)	17 May 1951	3 December 1990	
SK 1029		St. George's Romanian Orthodox Church	Kovačica	Uzdin Maršala Tita St. no. 141	6 April 1961	3 December 1990	
SK 1030		Arača	Novi Bečej	Novi Bečej outside of the town	16 February 1948	3 December 1990	
SK 1031		Complex of Buildings with Household	Pećinci	Karlovčić; Špajanska St. no. 50	3 June 1976	3 December 1990	
SK 1032		Ogar House	Pećinci	Ogar; Šumska St. no. 29	3 October 1973	3 December 1990	
SK 1033		Divša (Đipša) Monastery	Sremska Mitrovica	Divoš	7 December 1949	3 December 1990	
SK 1034		Palace of the Patriarchate	Sremski Karlovci	Sremski Karlovci; Branka Radičevića Square no. 8	21 April 1951	3 December 1990	
SK 1035		Subotica Synagogue	Subotica	Subotica Jakaba i Komora Square no. 4	8 April 1975	3 December 1990	
SK 1036		Subotica City Hall	Subotica	Subotica; Maršala Tita Square	14 March 1967	3 December 1990	
SK 1037		Roman Catholic Church in Čoka	Čoka	Čoka; Potiska St. no. 1	20 January 1972	3 December 1990	
SK 1038		Privina Glava monastery	Šid	Privina Glava Vuka Karadžića St.	6 December 1949	3 December 1990	
SK 1039		"Šlajz" Lock	Bečej	Bečej	22 June 1983	3 December 1990	
SK 1040		Krušedol monastery	Irig	Krušedol Selo	22 November 1949	3 December 1990	
SK 1041		Novo Hopovo monastery	Irig	near Irig	7 December 1949	3 December 1990	
SK 1042		Staro Hopovo monastery	Irig	near Irig	7 December 1949	3 December 1990	
SK 1043		Church of St. Nicholas	Kikinda	Kikinda; Srpskih dobrovoljaca Square no. 28	14 December 1948	3 December 1990	
SK 1044		Church of St. Luke	Pećinci	Kupinovo; Branka Madžarevića St. no. 144	18 May 1948	3 December 1990	
SK 1045		Kuveždin monastery	Sremska Mitrovica	Divoš	23 November 1949	3 December 1990	
SK 1046		Petkovica monastery	Sremska Mitrovica	Šišatovac	6 December 1949	3 December 1990	
SK 1047		Old Church of St. Stephen	Sremska Mitrovica	Sremska Mitrovica Muzejska St.	18 October 1949	3 December 1990	
SK 1048		Granary and Corn Crib	Stara Pazova	Golubinci; Pazovačka St. no. 64	12 September 1974	3 December 1990 (cluster of two monuments)	
SK 1049		Granary and Corn Crib	Stara Pazova	Golubinci; Pazovačka St. no. 42	7 September 1974	3 December 1990 (cluster of two monuments)	
SK 1050		Šišatovac monastery	Sremska Mitrovica	Šišatovac	22 November 1949	3 December 1990	
SK 1051		Church of the Transfiguration	Pančevo	Pančevo Dimitrija Tucovića St. no. 73	21 June 1948	3 December 1990	
SK 1052		Serbian Orthodox Church of St. Nicholas	Pećinci	Sibač	3 October 1969	3 December 1990	
SK 1053		The Orthodox Cathedral of Saint Nikolaj	Sremski Karlovci	Sremski Karlovci; Branka Radičevića Square no. 6	18 July 1949	3 December 1990	
SK 1078		Miloš Obrenović's House	Gornji Milanovac	Gornja Crnuća	5 November 1993	14 April 2000	
SK 1154		Almaška Church	Novi Sad	Novi Sad; Almaška St. no. 15	6 August 1948 (iconostasis)	3 December 1990	
SK 1156		Church of The Assumption	Novi Sad	Novi Sad; Uspenska St.	6 August 1948	3 December 1990	
SK 1174		Church of St. John	Sombor	Sombor Njegoševa St. no. 12	20 September 1950	3 December 1990	
SK 1207		Serbian Orthodox Church in Čurug	Žabalj	Čurug Kralja Petra I St.	25 May 1950 (iconostasis); 12 February 1971 (whole building)	3 December 1990	
SK 1211		Orthodox Church in Vilovo	Titel	Vilovo Žarka Zrenjanina St. no. 4	26 June 1957	3 December 1990	
SK 1238		Serbian Orthodox Church in Mokrin	Kikinda	Mokrin	18 June 1949 (iconostasis); 23 April 1969 (whole building)	3 December 1990	
SK 1366		Holy Archangels' Monastery*	Prizren	Jablanica	30 March 1948	4 June 1990	Looted and devastated in June–July 1999 by the Albanians, the 14th century Pine of Tsar Dušan was cut down and burned.
SK 1367		Gračanica monastery*	Pristina	Gračanica	25 October 1947	4 June 1990	World Heritage Site
SK 1368		Visoki Dečani*	Dečani	Dečane	25 October 1947	4 June 1990	World Heritage Site
SK 1369		Bogorodica Ljeviška*	Prizren	Prizren; Kralja Milutina St. no. 40	11 March 1948	4 June 1990	World Heritage Site. Burned and desecrated by Albanians in 2004.
SK 1370		Patriarchate of Peć*	Peć	Peć	25 October 1947	4 June 1990	World Heritage Site
SK 1371		Banjska monastery*	Zvečan	Banjska	26 August 1947	4 June 1990	
SK 1372		Terzijski Bridge*	Đakovica	Bistražin	22 December 1962	4 June 1990	
SK 1373		Vojinovića Bridge*	Vučitrn	Vučitrn; R. Dedovića St.	11 June 1949	3 December 1990	
SK 1374		Medieval palace of Vučitrn (Vojinović Tower)*	Vučitrn	Vučitrn	19 May 1949	3 December 1990	
SK 1375		(Remains of the) Serbian Orthodox Church (Monastery) of St. Barbara*	Gnjilane	Kmetovce	10 July 1963	3 December 1990	
SK 1376		Wooden house of Loćane (Danilović House)*	Dečani	Loćane	22 May 1958	3 December 1990	Burned and destroyed by the Albanians.
SK 1377		Hadum Mosque*	Đakovica	Đakovica	19 February 1955	3 December 1990	
SK 1378		Gorioč monastery*	Istok	near Istok	14 July 1958	3 December 1990	
SK 1379		Bogorodica Hvostanska (Remains)*	Istok	Studenica	10 July 1963	3 December 1990	
SK 1380		Serbian Orthodox Church of St. John the Baptist*	Istok	Crkolez	16 April 1958	3 December 1990	
SK 1381		St. Nicholas' Serbian Orthodox Church in Đurakovac*	Istok	Đurakovac	9 July 1955	3 December 1990	Burned and razed to the ground by the Albanians in 1999.
SK 1382		Remains of St. Peter and Paul's Monastery*	Klina	Dobra Voda	16 April 1958	3 December 1990 (cluster "Churches in the White Drin valley")	Partly demolished and desecrated by the Albanians in 1999.
SK 1383		Serbian Orthodox Church of the Presentation of the Virgin*	Klina	Dolac	16 April 1958	3 December 1990 (cluster "Churches in the White Drin valley")	In July 1999, Albanians vandalized the church and smashed the altar table to pieces. In August, the church was blown up and leveled.
SK 1384		Serbian Orthodox Church of St. Parascheva*	Klina	Drsnik	16 April 1958	3 December 1990 (cluster "Churches in the White Drin valley")	After the arrival of Italian KFOR forces into the area, the church was vandalized, set on fire and seriously damaged by Albanians using explosives, in June 1999.
SK 1385		Serbian Orthodox Church of St. Nicholas*	Klina	Mlečane	16 April 1958	3 December 1990 (cluster "Churches in the White Drin valley")	
SK 1386		Serbian Orthodox Church of St. Nicholas*	Klina	Čabić	16 April 1958	3 December 1990 (cluster "Churches in the White Drin valley")	The church was mined and completely demolished by the Albanians in 1999.
SK 1387		Serbian Orthodox Church of St. Nicholas*	Klina	Kijevo	16 April 1958	3 December 1990 (cluster "Churches in the White Drin valley")	Albanians mined the building in July 1999. The building collapsed entirely. Crosses and tombstones at the cemetery were also destroyed.
SK 1388		Serbian Orthodox Church of St. Demetrius – Donja Crkva (Lower Church)*	Klina	Pograđe	16 April 1958	3 December 1990 (cluster "Churches in the White Drin valley")	
SK 1389		Gornja Crkva (Upper Church)*	Klina	Pograđe	16 April 1958	3 December 1990 (cluster "Churches in the White Drin valley")	Desecrated by the Albanians in 1999.
SK 1390		Serbian Orthodox Church of the Presentation of the Virgin*	Kosovska Kamenica	Vaganeš	9 July 1955	3 December 1990	Vandalized by the Albanians in 1999.
SK 1391		Ubožac Monastery (Rđavac)*	Kosovska Kamenica	Močare	9 July 1955	3 December 1990	
SK 1392		Serbian Orthodox Church of the Presentation of the Virgin*	Lipljan	Lipljan	19 October 1949	3 December 1990	
SK 1393		Old medieval city of Novo Brdo*	Novo Brdo	Novo Brdo	28 February 1948	3 December 1990	
SK 1394		Serbian Orthodox Church of St. Nicholas*	Orahovac	Velika Hoča	16 April 1958	3 December 1990	
SK 1395		Serbian Orthodox Church of St. John the Baptist*	Orahovac	Velika Hoča	16 April 1958	3 December 1990	
SK 1396		Holy Transfiguration Church*	Klina	Budisavci	19 February 1952	3 December 1990	
SK 1397		Bajrakli Mosque*	Peć	Peć	31 December 1957	3 December 1990	
SK 1398		Serbian Orthodox Church of St. Jeremiah*	Peć	Goraždevac	16 April 1958	3 December 1990	
SK 1399		Kaljaja Fortress*	Prizren	Prizren	24 September 1948	3 December 1990	
SK 1400		Hermitage of St. Peter of Koriša*	Prizren	Kabaš near Koriša	16 December 1950	3 December 1990	
SK 1401		Church of Holy Salvation*	Prizren	Prizren; Šumadijske Divizije St. nn	27. 09.1948	3 December 1990	Destroyed by Albanians during 2004 unrest
SK 1402		Church of St. Nicholas*	Prizren	Prizren; Miladina Popovića St. no. 3	29 May 1962	3 December 1990	Heavily damaged by Albanians in 1999, and again in 2004, later renovated.
SK 1404		Church of the Holy Virgin in Sredska*	Prizren	Sredska; Pejčići	16 December 1950	3 December 1990 (cluster "Churches of Sredačka Župa")	
SK 1403		St. George's Church in Sredska*	Prizren	Sredska; Milačići	20 December 1956	3 December 1990 (cluster "Churches of Sredačka Župa")	
SK 1405		St. Nicholas' Church*	Prizren	Mušnikovo	20 December 1956	3 December 1990 (cluster "Churches of Sredačka Župa")	
SK 1406		St. Parascheva (St. Peter and Paul's) Church*	Prizren	Mušnikovo	20 December 1956	3 December 1990 (cluster "Churches of Sredačka Župa")	
SK 1407		St. Nicholas' Church*	Prizren	Bogoševce	20 December 1956	3 December 1990 (cluster "Churches of Sredačka Župa")	
SK 1408		St. George's Church*	Prizren	Gornje Selo	16 April 1958	3 December 1990 (cluster "Churches of Sredačka Župa")	
SK 1409		St. Nicholas' Church*	Prizren	Drajčići	16 April 1958	3 December 1990 (cluster "Churches of Sredačka Župa")	
SK 1410		Sinan Pasha's Mosque*	Prizren	Prizren; Sime Igumanova St. nn	27 September 1948	3 December 1990	
SK 1411		Old Hamam*	Prizren	Prizren; Kralja Petra I Oslobodioca St. nn	18. 09.1954	3 December 1990	
SK 1412		Imperial Mosque*	Pristina	Pristina; Dunavska St.	17 September 1953	3 December 1990	
SK 1413		Devič*	Srbica	Lauša	24 March 1948	3 December 1990	Heavily burned and damaged by the Albanians in 1999.
SK 1414		The church of the Holy Virgin Hodegetria*	Suva Reka	Mušutište	27 November 1948	3 December 1990	Completely destroyed by the Albanians in 1999.
SK 1415		Saint George Church*	Suva Reka	Rečane	11 September 1953	3 December 1990	The church was demolished by the Albanians in 1999.
SK 1416		Medieval Serbian City of Zvečan*	Zvečan	Zvečan	29 August 1947	3 December 1990	
SK 1417		Nerodimlje Medieval Town with St. Nicholas' Church and Ruins of Byzantine basilica*	Uroševac	Gornje Nerodimlje	31 December 1967	3 December 1990 (cluster "Monuments of Nerodimlje")	
SK 1418		Mali and Veliki Petrič Medieval Fortresses*	Uroševac	Gornje Nerodimlje; Jezerce	31 December 1967	3 December 1990 (cluster "Monuments of Nerodimlje")	
SK 1419		Church of Dormition of the Virgin – "Monastery of St. Uroš"*	Uroševac	Gornje Nerodimlje; Jezerce	29 December 1966	3 December 1990 (cluster "Monuments of Nerodimlje")	Albanians completely destroyed the monastery, using explosives, in 1999.
SK 1420		Church of the Holy Archangels*	Uroševac	Gornje Nerodimlje	19 July 1966	3 December 1990 (cluster "Monuments of Nerodimlje")	The church was looted and set on fire by the Albanians in 1999. A giant black pine tree was cut down and burned. The church cemetery was desecrated and the tombstones knocked over and damaged.
—		Church of St Stephen*	Uroševac	Donje Nerodimlje	—	3 December 1990 (cluster "Monuments of Nerodimlje")	The Church of St Stephen in Donje Nerodimlje was classified as a Cultural Monument of Exceptional Importance by the National Assembly as part of the cluster "Monuments of Nerodimlje", although it has never been proclaimed a Cultural Heritage at the first place. Thus, it is not inscribed into the Central Register. It was demolished, burned, and destroyed by explosive by the Albanians in 1999.
—		Church of St George in Gornja Bitinja*	Štrpce	Gornja Bitinja	—	3 December 1990 (cluster "Churches of Sirinićka Župa")	The Church of St George in Gornja Bitinja was classified as a Cultural Monument of Exceptional Importance by the National Assembly as part of the cluster "Churches of Sirinićka Župa", although it has never been proclaimed a Cultural Heritage at the first place. Thus, it is not inscribed in the Central Register.
SK 1421		St. Theodor Tyron's Church in Donja Bitinja*	Štrpce	Donja Bitinja	16 April 1958	3 December 1990 (cluster "Churches of Sirinićka Župa")	
SK 1422		St. Nicholas' Church in Gotovuša*	Štrpce	Gotovuša	16 April 1958	3 December 1990 (cluster "Churches of Sirinićka Župa")	
SK 1423		St. Nicholas' Church in Štrpce*	Štrpce	Štrpce	7 February 1967	3 December 1990 (cluster "Churches of Sirinićka Župa")	
SK 1424		Vojlovica monastery	Pančevo	Pančevo; Spoljnostarčevačka St. nn	29 July 1948 (iconostasis); 23 April 1969 (whole building)	3 December 1990	
SK 1425		Bishop's palace	Vršac	Vršac; Dvorska St. no. 20	24 January 1968	3 December 1990	
SK 1449		Church of the Holy Protection of the Virgin – Sokolica*	Zvečan	Veliko Rudare; Boljetin	25 December 1948	3 December 1990	
SK 1451		St. Gabriel's Church	Šid	Molovin Branka Radičevića St.	1 August 1951	3 December 1990	
SK 1469		"Mačkov Kamen" Complex	Ljubovija	Crnča on top of the Jagodnja mountain	25 November 1976	7 April 1979	
SK 1521		Novi Sad City Hall	Novi Sad	Novi Sad; Freedom Square no. 1	18 December 1998	12 January 1999	
—		Kadinjača	Užice	Zaglavak	—	7 April 1979	Kadinjača was classified as a Cultural Monument of Exceptional Importance by the National Assembly, although it has never been proclaimed a Cultural Heritage at the first place. Thus, it is not inscribed into the Central Register.

=== Archeological Sites of Exceptional Importance ===
Number in the Central Register	Photo	Name	City/Municipality	Location address	designated cultural heritage	Exceptional importance since	Comment
AN 5		Vinča-Belo Brdo	Belgrade / Grocka	Vinča	30 March 1950	7 April 1979	
AN 22		Mediana - Brzi Brod	Niš / Medijana	Brzi Brod Bulevar Svetog cara Konstantina	9 February 1949	7 April 1979	
AN 24		Justiniana Prima	Lebane	Prekopčelica	12 February 1949	7 April 1979	
AN 26		Mramorje	Bajina Bašta	Perućac	25 September 1968	7 April 1979	UNESCO World Heritage Site "Medieval Tomstones - Stećci"
AN 33		Velika humka	Požega	Pilatovići	29 April 1980	21 July 1983	
AN 39		Rudna Glava	Majdanpek	Rudna Glava	24 June 1981	21 July 1983	
AN 40		Gamzigrad–Romuliana (The Palace of Galerius)	Zaječar	Gamzigradska Banja	19 March 1948	7 April 1979	UNESCO World Heritage Site
AN 44		Pontes with Trajan's Bridge	Kladovo	Kladovo	28 March 1981	21 July 1983	
AN 45		Lepenski Vir	Majdanpek	Boljetin	26 May 1966	7 April 1979	
AN 103		Diana Fortress (Karataš)	Kladovo	Novi Sip	27 February 1965	21 July 1983	
AN 104		Starčevo site (Grad)	Pančevo	Starčevo	8 April 1957	3 December 1990	
AN 105		Bassianae	Ruma	Donji Petrovci	15 October 1947	3 December 1990	
AN 106		Sirmium	Sremska Mitrovica	Sremska Mitrovica	9 December 1948	3 December 1990	
AN 107		Židovar	Vršac	Orešac	16 October 1978	3 December 1990	
AN 108		Gomolava	Ruma	Hrtkovci	30 December 1950	3 December 1990	
AN 109		Čibska šuma	Bačka Palanka	Čelarevo	28 November 1972	3 December 1990	
AN 123		Kalvarija (Titelski plato)	Titel	Titel outside of the town	16 February 1971	3 December 1990	
AN 124		Ulpiana*	Priština	Gračanica	22 April 1955	4 June 1990	
AN 140		Viminacium	Požarevac / Kostolac	Stari Kostolac	15 March 1949	7 April 1979	
—		Kraku Lu Jordan	Kučevo	Brodica	—	21 July 1983	Kraku Lu Jordan was classified as an Archaeological Site of Exceptional Importance by the National Assembly, although it was never proclaimed a Cultural Heritage at the first place. Thus, it is not inscribed into the Central Register.

=== Historic Landmarks of Exceptional Importance ===
Number in the Central Register	Photo	Landmark	City/Municipality	Location address	designated cultural heritage	Exceptional importance since	Comment
ZM 6		Bela Crkva Memorial Complex	Krupanj	Bela Crkva	28 April 1949	7 April 1979	Site of the Uprising in Serbia (1941) includes: former kafana building, municipal building, old school and church, with several monuments and memorials.
ZM 7		Bubanj Memorial Park	Niš / Palilula	Bubanj	30 May 1973	7 April 1979	
ZM 9		Šumarice Memorial Park	Kragujevac	Kragujevac	27 December 1979	7 April 1979	
ZM 12		Kraljevo Memorial Park	Kraljevo	Kraljevo	1 June 1984	21 July 1983	Site of the Kraljevo massacre
ZM 13		Čegar	Niš / Pantelej	Kamenica	7 April 1983	21 July 1983	
ZM 15		Stolice site	Krupanj	Krupanj; Stolice	19 July 1949	7 April 1979	Building in which the Stolice conference was held.
ZM 16		Marićevića jaruga	Aranđelovac	Orašac	24 June 1983	7 April 1979	
ZM 18		Memorial Complex "Boško Buha"	Prijepolje	Jabuka	30 May 1986	5 December 1987	
ZM 19		"Takovski grm" Memorial Complex	Gornji Milanovac	Takovo	6 July 1990	14 April 2000	
ZM 21		Radovanjski Lug	Velika Plana	Radovanje	27 May 1971	7 April 1979	
ZM 26		Chapel of Peace (Site of the signing of Treaty of Karlowitz)	Sremski Karlovci	Sremski Karlovci; Sremska St.	23 May 1963	3 December 1990	
ZM 27		Site of the Battle of Slankamen	Inđija	Stari Slankamen	27 March 1969	3 December 1990	
ZM 28		Site of the Battle of Petrovaradin (Vezirac Hill Memorial)	Novi Sad / Petrovaradin	Petrovaradin	2 April 1968	3 December 1990	
ZM 39		Memorial Complex in Idvor (Mihajlo Pupin)	Kovačica	Idvor; Mihajla Pupina St. no. 39	28 July 1977	3 December 1990	Complex includes: Birthhouse of Michael Pupin, School he attended, Michael Pupin Foundation building and Pupin House.
ZM 41		Memorial Complex "Syrmian Front"	Šid	Adaševci	29 December 1994	3 December 1990	
ZM 42		Ljubić Memorial Complex	Čačak	Ljubić	24 February 1971	21 July 1983	
ZM 60		Memorial Ossuary on Mount Cer	Loznica	Tekeriš	26 September 2001	7 April 1979	
ZM 61		Birth house of Vuk Karadžić	Loznica	Tršić	31 October 2002	7 April 1979	
—		Site of the Battle of Senta	Senta	Senta; Porong	—	3 December 1990	Site of the Battle of Senta was classified as a Historic Landmark of Exceptional Importance by the National Assembly, although it was never proclaimed a Cultural Heritage at the first place. Thus, it is not inscribed into the Central Register.

=== Spatial Cultural-Historical Units of Exceptional Importance ===
Number in the Central Register	Picture	Name	City/Municipality	Location address	designated cultural heritage	Exceptional importance since	Comment
PKIC 1		Knez Mihailova Street	Belgrade / Stari Grad	Belgrade; Knez Mihailova St.	6 April 1964	7 April 1979	From the Kalemegdan Park to the Obilićev Venac Street.
PKIC 7		Old Čaršija Tešnjar	Valjevo	Valjevo	5 March 1969	7 April 1979	
PKIC 22		Novi Pazar Fortress with the Old Bazaar and Altun Alem Mosque Complex	Novi Pazar	Novi Pazar	7 June 1985	7 April 1979	
PKIC 26		Gornja Dobrinja Complex	Požega	Gornja Dobrinja	17 October 1991	7 April 1979	The complex includes the Church of St. Peter and Paul (itself designated a Cultural Monument of Exceptional importance), the warehouse, several tombstones and Prince Miloš birthplace memorial.
PKIC 10		Štubik Wine Cellars	Negotin	Štubik	8 June 1980	21 July 1983 (as a single complex "Negotin Wine Cellars")	
PKIC 14		Rajac and Rogljevo wine cellars complex	Negotin	Rajac and Rogljevo	23 February 1983	21 July 1983 (as a single complex "Negotin Wine Cellars")	
PKIC 16		Topčider	Belgrade / Rakovica Belgrade / Savski venac	Belgrade	9 July 1987	5 December 1987	
PKIC 18		Area around Dositej's Lyceum	Belgrade / Stari Grad	Belgrade	23 November 1989	3 December 1990	Streets: Cara Uroša, Kralja Petra, Gospodar Jevremova, Gospodar Jovanova, Kapetan Mišina, Simina, Braće Jugovića, Kneginje Ljubice, Studentski Square, Zmaja od Noćaja, Višnjićeva
PKIC 24		Stari Ras Monumental Area	Novi Pazar	Novi Pazar	24 November 1978	5 December 1987	World Heritage Site "Stari Ras and Sopoćani". Stari Ras Monumental Area includes: Ras Fortress with Suburb (Pazarište), Petrova Church, Đurđevi Stupovi Monastery and Sopoćani Monastery (all four designated as Cultural Monuments of Exceptional Importance on their own).
PKIC 47		Sremski Karlovci city core	Sremski Karlovci	Sremski Karlovci	18 July 1949	3 December 1990	
PKIC 52		Bač Fortress	Bač	Bač; Bačke tvrđave St.	30 July 1948	3 December 1990	
PKIC 59		|Gazimestan Memorial Complex*	Priština	Priština; Gazimestan	10 May 1950	4 June 1990	
PKIC 74		Military Technical Institute Complex	Kragujevac	Kragujevac; Vojno-tehnički zavod, Pirotehnika	25 March 2014	12 February 2016	
PKIC 84		"Staro selo" Etno Complex	Čajetina	Sirogojno	27 November 1985	21 July 1983	The Complex includes: Church Sts. Peter and Paul (itself designated a Cultural Monument of Exceptional importance), graveyard and Rural ethno-complex.
—		Fruška Gora with its monasteries and other monuments	Bačka Palanka; Beočin; Inđija; Irig; Novi Sad; Sremska Mitrovica; Šid	—	—	3 December 1990	"Fruška Gora with Monasteries and Other Monuments" was classified a Spatial Cultural-Historical Unit of Exceptional Importance by the National Assembly, although it has never been proclaimed a Cultural Heritage at the first place. Thus, it is not inscribed into the Central Register. Includes the whole Fruška Gora National Park. Most of the monasteries are inscribed separately as Cultural monuments.

== See also ==
- Immovable Cultural Heritage of Great Importance (Serbia)
- Serbian culture
- Cultural Heritage of Serbia
- List of National Monuments of Bosnia and Herzegovina
- Immovable Cultural Monuments of National Significance (Georgia)
