= Velika humka =

Coordinates: 43°51′39″N 20°04′52″E

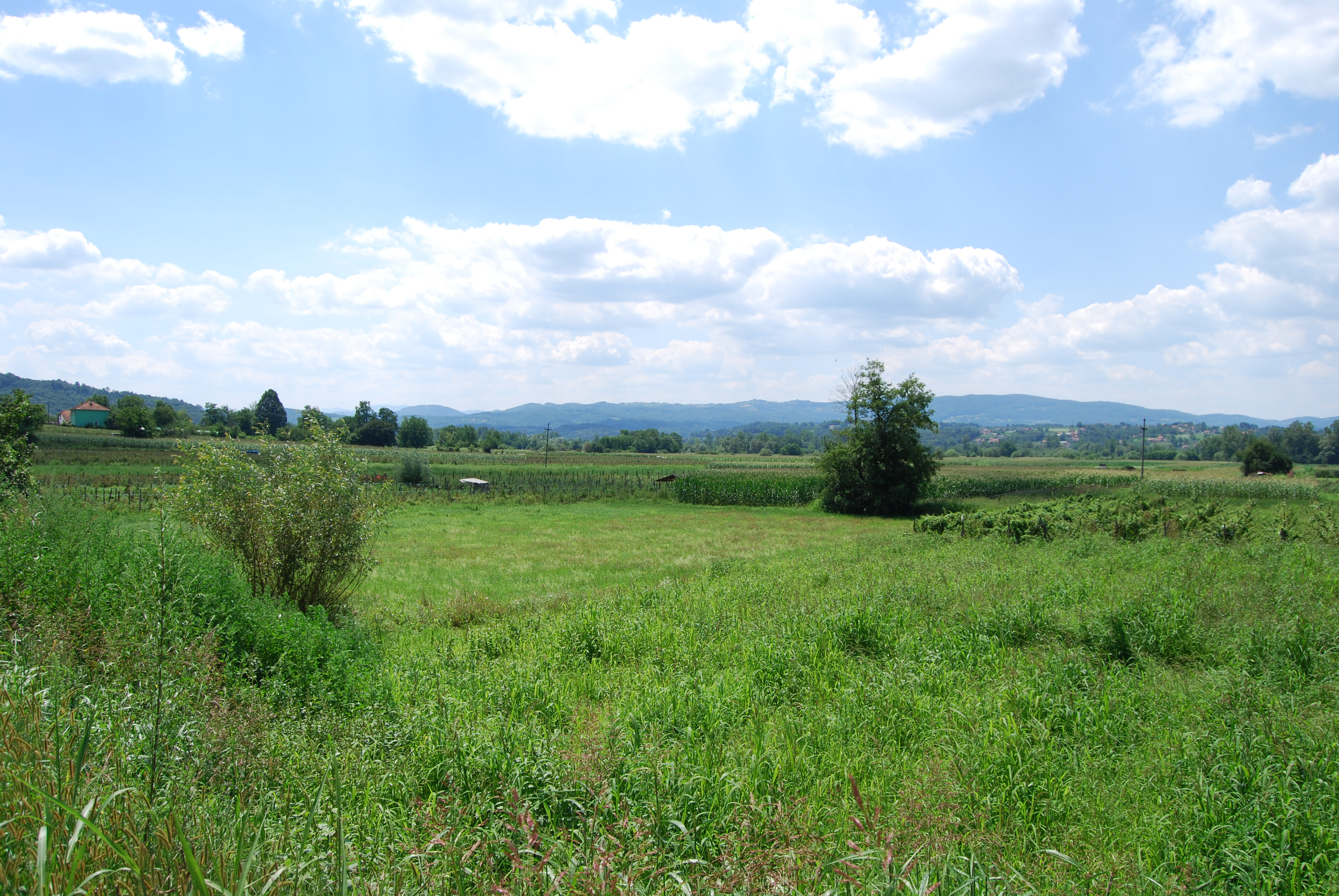
Velika humka

Velika humka is an archeological site and settlement near Pilatovići, Požega municipality, Serbia.

In 1983, Velika humka was added to the Archaeological Sites of Exceptional Importance list, protected by Republic of Serbia.

== See also ==
- Archaeological Sites of Exceptional Importance
