= Church of St. Archdeacon Stephen, Sremska Mitrovica =

Church of St. Archdeacon Stephen
- Црква светог архиђакона Стефана
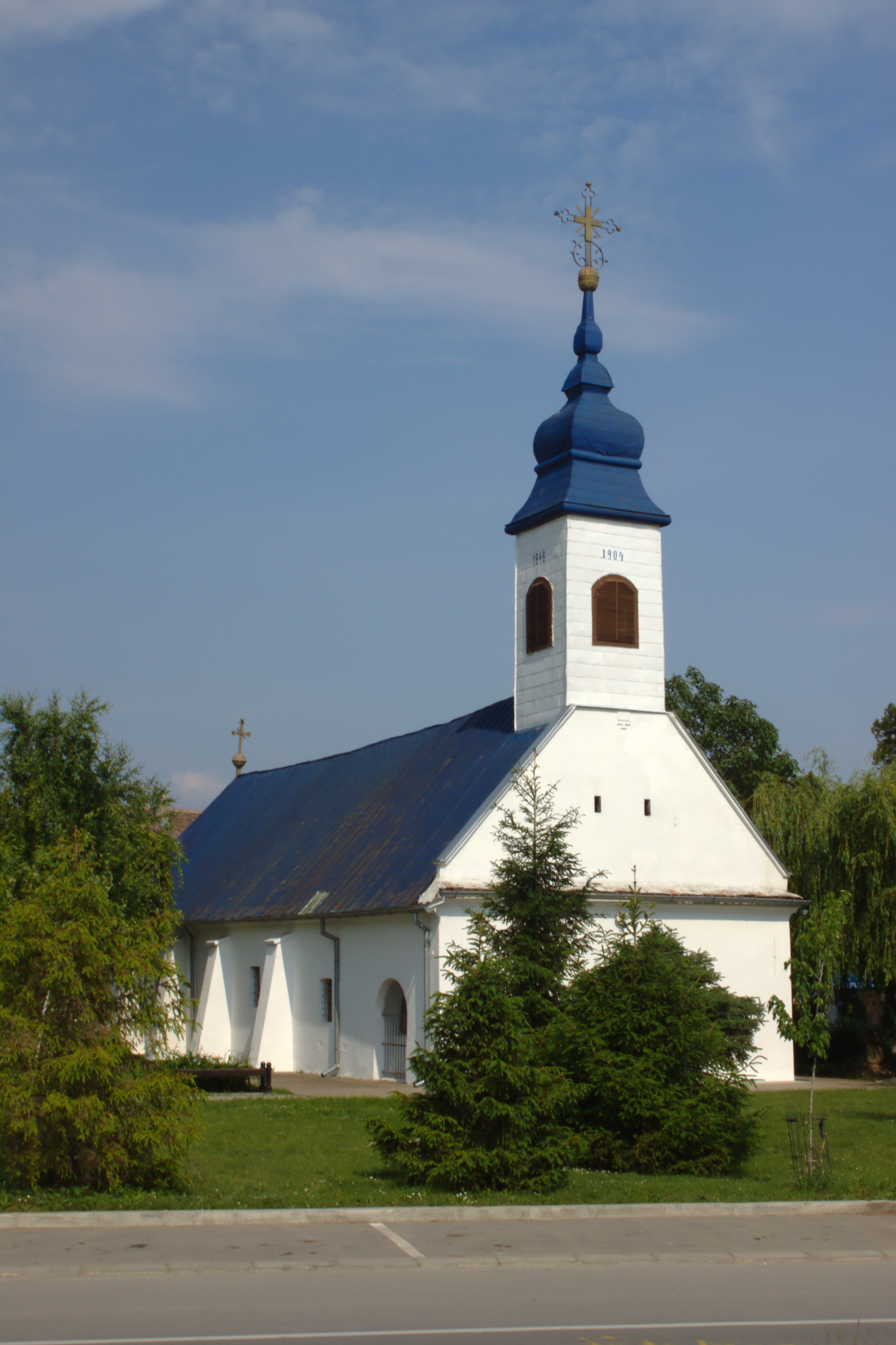
- St. Archdeacon Stephen
- Church of St. Archdeacon Stephen
- 44°58′08″N 19°36′09″E
- Location: Sremska Mitrovica, Vojvodina

Cultural Heritage of Serbia
- Type: Immovable Cultural Heritage of Exceptional Importance
- Designated: 1993
- Reference no.: СК 1047
- Country: Serbia
- Denomination: Serbian Orthodox

History
- Status: Church
- Dedication: Saint Stephen

Architecture
- Functional status: Active
- Years built: end of XVI or the beginning of XVII century

Administration
- Archdiocese: Eparchy of Srem

The Church of St. Archdeacon Stephen (Serbian: Црква светог архиђакона Стефана), locally colloquially known as the Old Orthodox Church or the Small Church, in Sremska Mitrovica is Serbian Orthodox church in Vojvodina, Serbia. It is the oldest preserved place of worship in the city of Sremska Mitrovica.

== Details ==
The church belongs to the Eparchy of Srem of the Serbian Orthodox Church. The building is listed as Immovable Cultural Heritage of Exceptional Importance. It is the only cultural monument of exceptional importance in the city, significant for both its historical value and its age, as it is the only preserved urban building from the time of Ottoman rule in Syrmia.

Following the departure of the Ottoman forces, an apse and bell tower were added, giving the church its present form and dimensions by the early 1780s. The iconostasis, intricately carved in the latter half of the 18th century, is notable for its rich floral and zoomorphic motifs. These stylistic features link it to the woodcarving workshops and artisans from the south, especially Mount Athos.

Contemporary church was built at the site that was built at an earlier site from Sirmium era. Archaeological findings from 1980 beneath the church's altar uncovered a red marble mosaic cross dating to the Roman era, indicating earlier Christian presence at the site. Further excavations revealed remnants of Roman baths, repurposed or demolished upon Christianity's rise.

== See also ==
- St. Demetrius Church, Sremska Mitrovica
