= Kraku Lu Jordan =

Archaeological site in Serbia

Coordinates: 44°29′14″N 21°48′41″E

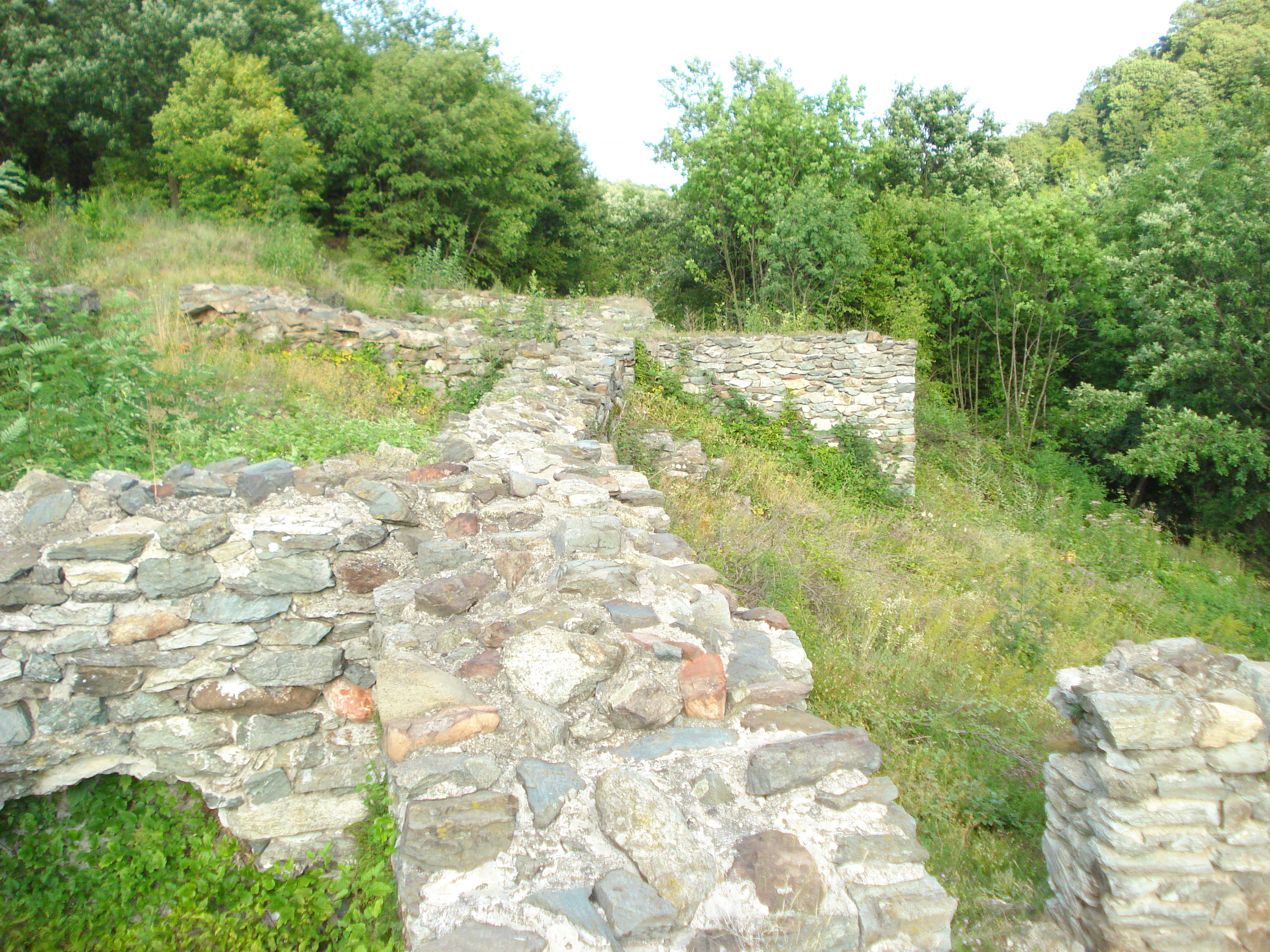
Kraku Lu Jordan

Kraku Lu Jordan (Serbian: Краку Лу Јордан/Kraku Lu Jordan, Romanian: Cracul lui Iordan) is archeological site in Serbia. It is situated at the confluence of the Brodica river into Pek, near Kučevo. Represents the most explored metallurgical center in eastern Serbia. The metallurgic occupation of the site lasted for about 100 years, beginning around 280 AD and ending in 380 AD. Kraku Lu Jordan is precisely dated by discovered coins from Diocletian time. This metallurgical complex was then destroyed in a fire in the late 4th century. Archaeological excavations began in 1971, and with few interruptions, lasted until 1987.

In 1983, Kraku Lu Jordan was added to the Archaeological Sites of Exceptional Importance list, protected by Republic of Serbia.

== Location and Layout ==
Kraku Lu Jordan is located on the southern slope of a hill, where on the slope a metallurgical plant is set with an internal arrangement for its purpose of processing ore, copper and iron. It was a fortified establishment that to the east side had a wall that is 2 m of width, in contrast to the northern side, which is extremely rugged and inaccessible, where the wall is slightly narrower. The gate was located in the lower part. On the northwestern side remains of a tower has been discovered which had the function of one of the metallurgical facilities. Slope on which the building is located was divided into several longitudinal walls horizons. The work of Bartel, Kondić, and Werner revealed a number of areas with metallurgical furnaces, facilities for the preparation of ember as well as other areas of personal life needs of metallurgists and miners. The site contains six main features: the northern wall, the western furnace room, the southern ‘utility’ room, the southern furnace room, the southern stairway, and the southern ‘office’ room.

== Remains ==
Of material culture, tools, mining lamps, large vessels for burning ore, watermill wheels and more have been found. In the years 1973–76, ceramics found consisted of 37 Early Bronze Age sherds and 6,215 Roman Era sherds. Of the Roman era pottery, 95% was local, one piece was truly Roman, and 5% probably came from neighboring Pannonia. Most of the ceramics are simply decorated and some were coated in yellow-white powder which indicates they contained chemicals for metallurgy. 200 metal artifacts were found, most iron and utilitarian in nature. Other objects include glass, lithics, and animals bones. Bartel, Kondić, and Werner concluded that the complex was relatively independent of Roman influence and more related to the activities of indigenous people in the area, because of the style and volume of material culture.

== See also ==
- Tourism in Serbia
- Archaeological Sites of Exceptional Importance
