= Dunđerski Palace (Čelarevo) =

Palace in Čelarevo, Serbia

- Дворац породице Дунђерски
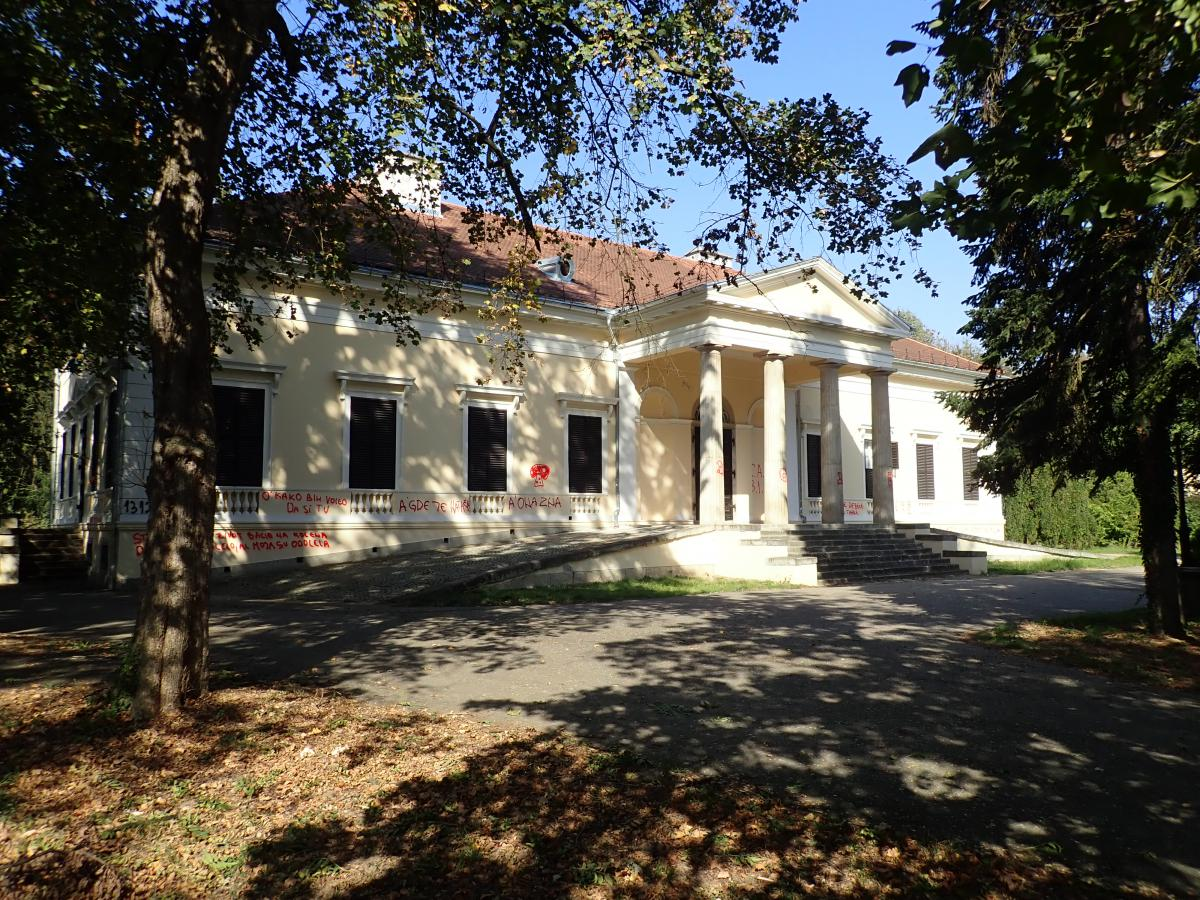

- Location within Serbia

General information
- Location: Čelarevo, Proleterska, Bačka Palanka, Serbia
- Coordinates: 45°16′21.7302″N 19°31′8.5506″E
- Renovated: 1985/1988,

Cultural Heritage of Serbia
- Type: Cultural Monument of Exceptional Importance
- Designated: 7 May 1970
- Reference no.: SK 1015

Dunđerski Palace (Serbian: Дворац Дунђерски) is a palace in Čelarevo, Serbia. It was built by the Dunđerski family and is currently under reconstruction. Palace was declared a Monument of Culture of Exceptional Importance in 1983, and it is protected by the Republic of Serbia.

== See also ==
- Fantast Castle
- Tourism in Serbia
