= Hopovo =

Hopovo may refer to:

- Staro Hopovo Monastery, a monastery in Srem, Vojvodina, Serbia
- Novo Hopovo Monastery, a monastery in Srem, Vojvodina, Serbia
