= National Museum Kraljevo =

- Народни музеј Краљево; Narodni muzej Kraljevo

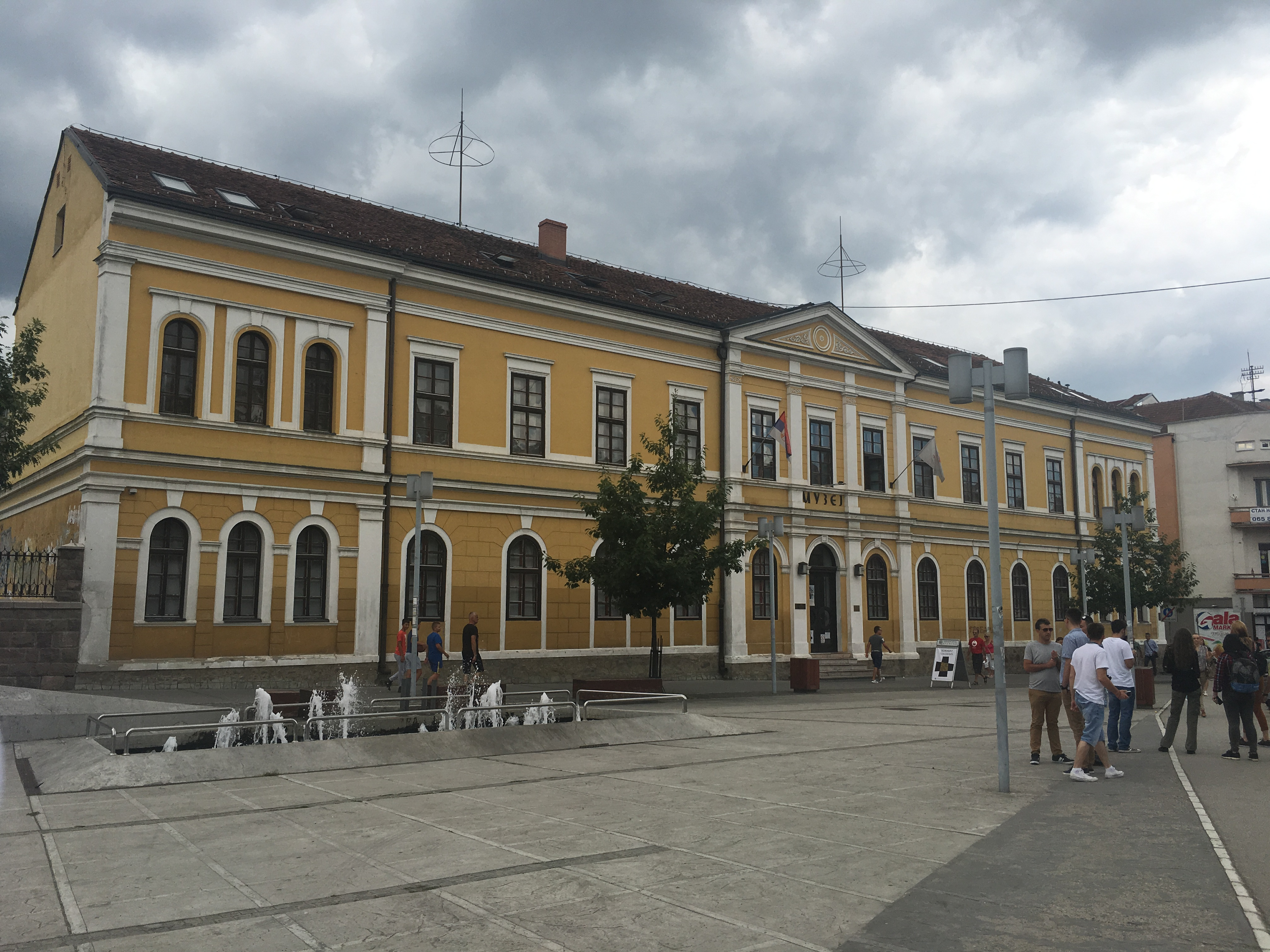
- Front façade of the National Museum Kraljevo
- Established: 1950; 76 years ago
- Location: Sveti Sava Square 2, Kraljevo, Serbia
- Coordinates: 43°43′31″N 20°41′01″E
- Type: History museum Art museum
- Director: Darko Gučanin
- Website: nmkv.rs

The National Museum Kraljevo (Serbian: Народни музеј Краљево / Narodni muzej Kraljevo) was founded in 1950, under the name Rankovićevo City Museum, as a local heritage museum. It got its current name in 1955. The National Museum Kraljevo serves the cities of Kraljevo and Novi Pazar, as well as the municipalities of Raška, Vrnjačka Banja, and Tutin.

Housed in a historic school building constructed in 1873, the museum moved into this location after the Kraljevo Municipal Assembly transferred ownership in 1985. The building underwent extensive renovations, with the first phase completed in 1995, adding a large, representative gallery. The final phase, completed between 2002 and 2005, expanded the museum to a total area of 1,270 square meters over four levels. The museum is located across the street from the local archive and next to the Church of the Holy Trinity.

It is a comprehensive museum with its entire collection divided into six categories: Natural History, Archaeology, Numismatics, History, Ethnology, and Art. In addition to the main building on Sveti Sava Square in Kraljevo, the Museum also includes a building on Karađorđeva Street where the Olivera Radojković Čolović Legacy is housed. Together with the Historical Archive of Kraljevo the museum publishes peer reviewed annual journal Naša prošlost.

== See also ==
- List of museums in Serbia
- Kraljevački October Memorial Park
- Žiča
