= Secret print shop of the Communist Party of Yugoslavia =

Communist secret print shop

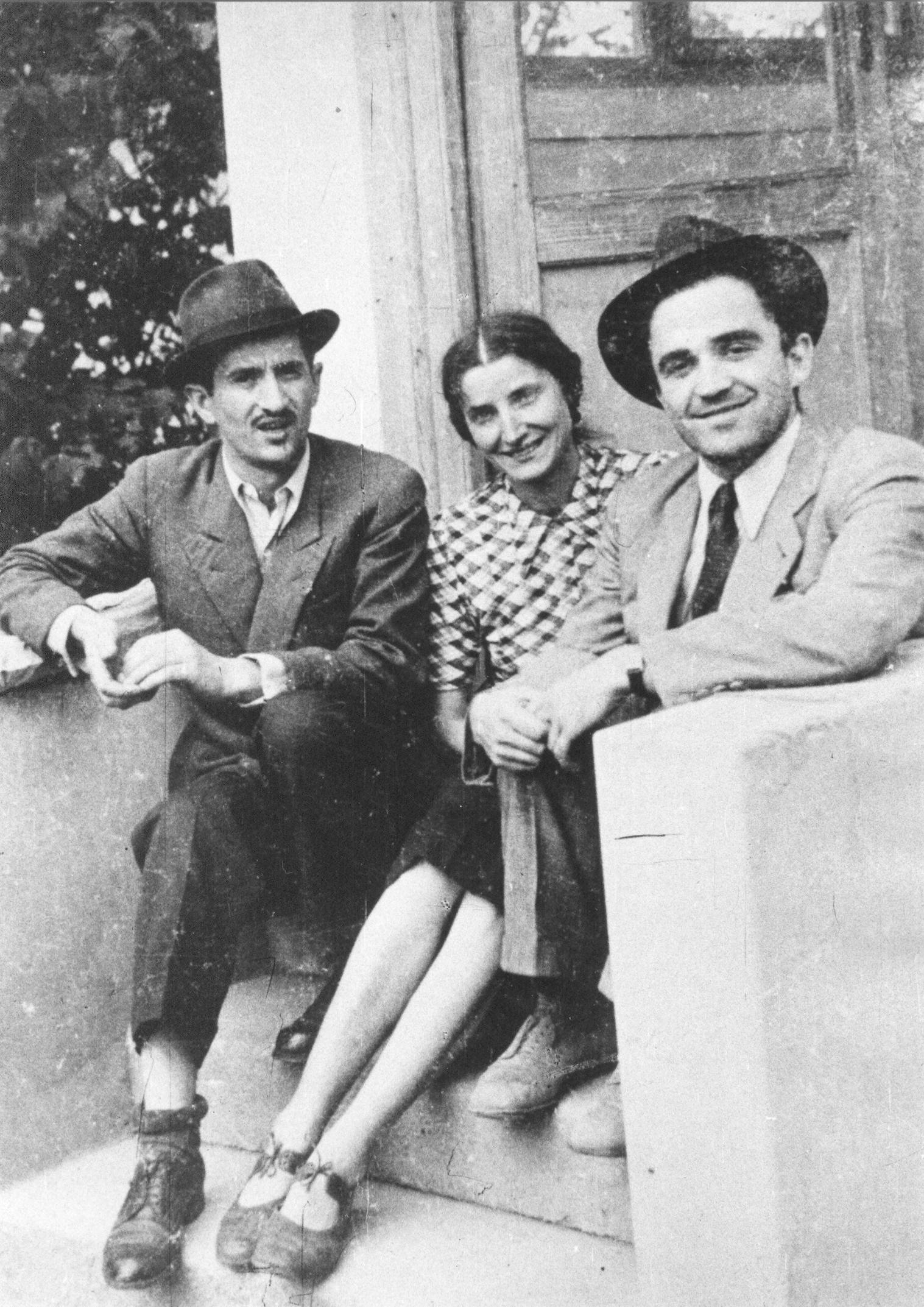
Slobodan Jović, Dana Maksimović and Branko Đonović, in front of an illegal printing house in Belgrade, 1943.

During the Axis occupation of Yugoslavia, the Communist Party of Yugoslavia (CPY) operated a secret print shop (Serbian: Илегална партијска штампарија / Ilegalna partijska štamparija) in Belgrade, Serbia. The shop was located in a house in Banjica that was built and used by the CPY as a print shop from August 1, 1941 to August 31, 1944. The secret pressroom in the house was never discovered by the Nazis.

In 1950, the house was turned into a memorial museum containing the material about all secret Partisan print shops in Belgrade. The museum was closed in August 2000. The house was declared a Cultural Monument of Exceptional Importance in 1979.

== History ==
The Party started the building of the house on Banjički venac no. 12 prior to the bombing and occupation of Belgrade in April 1941, which halted the works until May. The house was finished by the end of July 1941. Svetozar Vukmanović organized men and plans for the construction, and provided new machines and materials for the pressroom. Through Branko Đonović, he provided two printing machines — one was large and worked on electric power, the other was smaller and worked on manual operation. These machines were bought in Zemun from a merchant and brought to the house. Since the building of the house was still not finished, the machines were hidden among the constructional material. Vukmanović also recruited people for work in the pressroom. He then decided to rent a house to a young couple with a maid, so that in the backyard two experienced graphic workers can work. His choices were M.D. Mile Bosković, Zagorka Jovanović and Ljubica Đonović. Bosković was his old acquaintance since his high school days in Cetinje. He was the member of the CPY, but unknown to the Belgrade police, because he studied abroad. Jovanović was a student of medicine in Kragujevac, she already worked in one secret pressroom before, and she was very reliable. Since Bosković was a bachelor, it was decided that he and Jovanović are to get married. This wedding solved the problem, Jovanović was well known to the police, so after the wedding she adopted new last name and changed her documents. Ljubica Đonović, the old acquaintance of Vukmanović and a member of CPY, got the part of the house maid and moved in the house afterwards. Choosing the workers for the pressroom, Vukmanović chose only the experts. He chose two workers for the pressroom, first one was graphic worker Branko Đonović, who also recommended the other worker, typographer Slobodan Jović. From the tenants of the house, they formed a special cell which was directly connected to the Central committee of the CPY (CCCPY), whose secretary was Jovanović.

After Vukmanović left, the care of illegal pressroom was taken over by Ivan Milutinović, member of the CCCPY. This pressroom was a secret not only for a police and Germans, but also for most members of the Party. The people that knew for the pressroom were Vukmanović, Milutinović, Đorđe Andrejević Kun, workers in the pressroom, owners of the house Branko and Dana Maksimović, as well as Josip Broz Tito and members of the Politburo of CCCPY. After Milutinović left the pressroom and went to the liberated territory in the middle of September 1941, Blagoje Nesković took over managing of the pressroom; he was a secretary of the Provincial Committee of CPY for Serbia. By the end of July 1941 the pressroom was moved in the house in Banjički venac. Andrejević Kun then made a special closet with the help of his father-in-law Mihajlo Ratković, that closet was hiding a secret entrance to the pressroom. After that, they isolated the pressroom with the boards, so that the noise from the machines could not be heard. Before they moved in, they solved another problem — electricity. The machine needed a three phase current, which they installed under the illusion that the doctor's office needed it. Since the machines used a large amount of electricity they had to remodel electric meter. Special room in which the pressroom was placed was equipped, besides the two printing machines, with two beds, maps of the current events on the front, radio, three guns and several bombs. The pressroom started to work August 1, 1941 by printing the first issue of the Bulletin of the HighCommand of NLA Detachments of Yugoslavia, which was brought in the pressroom by Milutinović.

== Organization of work and life in the pressroom ==
In the house on Banjički venac there were special rules for living and working. Gate and the front door were always locked. Secret entrance to the pressroom was always open. During the work hours everybody was in the pressroom except one tenant who was on duty upstairs. Branko Đonović and Jović slept in the room which led directly to the pressroom. In the case of emergency they had to climb down the ladder in the secret room. They had no visitors except Branko and Dana Maksimović, whom lived nearby, in the house of Branko's father. For delivering printing materials, Jovanović was in charge. She met every day in the agreed time and place with Milorad Rajter and exchanges the material. During this job Jovanović used a different ID so that the police, in the case of her arrest could not find the pressroom. Later, Ljubica Đonović joined Jovanović in this job but they worked separately. In time, as the repression grew, the action of exchanging materials took more and more people involved. First, Branko Maksimović joined them, and then Branko Đonović and Jović, armed with fake IDs, followed.

All the police attempts to find the secret pressroom failed and it continue to work regularly. Distribution of the material from the house in Banjički venac was taking place in the apartment in Lastina street no. 9, where the central expeditionary station was located. That apartment was owned by civil servant Miroslav Parezanović and his wife Olga. From there materials were taken by the technicians of the Provincial Committee, Slavka Morić and Srbijanka Bukumirović, who delivered it to couriers of the committee and to the headquarters of the Partisan squad. Part of party material was distributed in Belgrade, and part was sent all over occupied Yugoslavia.

Secret work of the pressroom gave top results. It was organized so that the people who worked in the pressroom and those who took over the material did not know each other. Also, the people who expedited the material did not know where the pressroom was located. Because of that the pressroom stayed undetected and survived two large police interventions into Partisans' organization.

In fall 1941 and spring 1942, because all of the police activities, the work in the pressroom was in stagnation, but it remained undetected. Police put in a lot of effort to discover it. They checked all the technique in all public pressrooms in the city, and since they could not find anything, they figured out that the pressroom was somewhere in the heartland. One event that showed the police that the pressroom was, in fact, in Belgrade was on 7 November 1942. In the streets of Belgrade, flyers were distributed with a report on the speech which Sergei Molotov delivered in Moscow on 6 November. This speech was broadcast through Radio Moscow around 7 pm. The flyers were all over Belgrade by 9 pm. By August 1943, the pressroom printed five issues of the Bulletin of the High Command, seven issues of Glas, Proleter for 1942, declarations of the Provincial Committee of CPY of 1 July 1942, 7 September 1942, March 1943 and 1 May 1943, four Circular issues of the Provincial Committee, declaration of the CK SKOJ of 7 November 1942, different books, flyers, radio news and other materials.

== Departure of Bosković ==
By the end of December 1941 Gestapo began the purge of the Belgrade University. Since Bosković kept reserved and did not declare himself about the National Liberation War, Gestapo decided him of freemasonry. Especially suspicious was that he studied abroad, so he was tagged as English spy.

In the night of 5/6 January 1942 German police came to the house to look for Bosković. He was hiding in the secret pressroom, along with Branko Đonović and Jović. Jovanović and Ljubica Đonović explained the police that Bosković went to visit his cousin outside the city. Police then searched the house, but found nothing suspicious. Before they left, they told Jovanović that Bosković must immediately report to Gestapo, the moment he returns. Week later another German patrol came by the house and brought a new invitation for Bosković to report to Gestapo. Party organization than made a decision that Bosković is no longer legal tenant of the house, so he joined Branko Đonović and Jović in there hiding in the pressroom.

At the end of January 1942 Andrejević Kun came to the pressroom. In that time he lived in administrative colony under the fake name Antonović, but that alias became unsure so he moved to the house in Banjički venac. Since Kun was to stay in occupied Belgrade, he had to hide in the pressroom until a safe place for him is found. During that time he was working on making fake IDs. He made fake documents on the name Vinko Tomasević for Bosković, who went to Zagreb at the beginning of July 1942. There, he connected with Ivanka Mucević Nikolas with whom he was supposed to cross to the liberated territory and go to Tito's Supreme headquarters. Since they lost their connection, Nikolas and Bosković were spotted by the police in one of their walks in occupied Zagreb. One policeman recognized Nikolas and arrested her along with Bosković. That was the first time that the police captured somebody from the secret pressroom. Bosković revealed nothing, so he was transferred to the Stara Gradiška concentration camp where he was murdered in September 1944.

== Germans moving in the house ==
After finding that doctor Bosković was arrested in Zagreb, members of the secret pressroom decided that they are not going to keep the house rented on his name, because of the fear that the police may find out about his arrest. Jovanović and Ljubica Đonović reported to the police that they are moving to their cousins to countryside. They both remained in the house as illegal tenants. Branko and Dana Maksimović then returned as legal tenants.

Secret life in the house became extremely hard, in the afternoon while Maksimovićs were at work, other tenants could not make a sound, and during the winter because of the smoke they could not build a fire to worm. During his travels to Macedonia, where he was sent by Supreme headquarters, Svetozar Vukmanović visited Belgrade from December 1942 until January 1943. After year and a half he came back to the pressroom.

At the beginning of the May 1942 a large number of significant members of Partisans from Belgrade, went to the liberated territory in Bosnia, where the Supreme headquarters of the Partisans were located. In that group were Đorđe Andrejević Kun, Vladislav and Jara Ribnikar, Slavka Morić, Milada Rajter, Brana Petrović and others to whom Jovanović and Ljubica Đonović joined.

Work of the pressroom continued until August 31, 1943 when the Germans ordered that all tenants must leave the house in three days, so that their officers could move in. They also ordered that all the furniture must stay in the house. Since the deadline for the moving of the pressroom was so short, and party organization in Belgrade in that time was in troubles, Branko Đonović and Jović had to organize moving of the pressroom themselves. By the instructions of the Provincial Committee, they moved smaller printing machine to the secret shelter in the apartment of Milutin Blagojević in Krajinska street number 24. Because of the fear that the Germans might find the secret printroom, the Provincial Committee advised Maksimovićs to go illegal, and soon in October they crossed to liberated territory in Srem.

German officers, whom from September 1943 to October 1944, lived in the house in Banjički venac 12, never noticed that on the bottom of the closet was a hidden entrance to the secret pressroom.

== Museum ==
House on Banjički venac 12 was made into the Museum of Secret Party pressrooms on 1 May 1950, which was a section of the Museum of Belgrade. Exhibition represented the work of secret pressrooms that worked on the territory of occupied Belgrade. A memorial plaque was placed on the house and it was declared a Cultural Monument of Exceptional Importance in 1979.

Museum was closed for the visitors August 2000 and house was return to the successors of Branko and Dana Maksimović, after the litigation with the city of Belgrade.

== In popular culture ==
Work of the secret pressroom was described in many books which deal with World War II in Belgrade, and especially good description was given by Dragan Marković in his book Otpisani (The Written Off). During the filming of the TV series Otpisani in 1974, screenwriters Dragan Marković and Siniša Pavić dedicated an episode under the name Pressroom. In the series, the things have been changed a little so that the events in the pressroom happen faster than they did in reality.

The names of the characters in series were also changed, so instead of Bosković and student Jovanović appears doctor Janković (Zoran Milosavljević) and Olivera (Svetlana Bojković), instead of house keeper Ljubica appears Ivana (Ljubica Ković) who was shown as a middle aged woman, graphic workers Zareta (Đorđe Jelisić) and Nenad (Josif Tatić) also don't have many similarities with Branko Đonović and Slobodan Jović, while the character Milan (Mirko Bulović) is the closest to the actual Milutin Blagojević, owner of the house where the other pressroom was located.

== Literature ==
- Dr. Ubavka Vujošević "Tito u Beogradu 1941-1944".Belgrade museum and "Book of Yugoslavia", Belgrade 1977.
- Dragan Marković "Otpisani". "Prosveta" Belgrade 1977.
- Aleksandar Tadić "Majke heroja pričaju". "Iskra" Vinkovci 1985
- Darinka Lekić "Beograd grad za sva vremena". "Nauka" Belgrade 1995.
