= Mesić Monastery =

Monastery in Serbia

Coordinates: 45.1044°N 21.3933°E

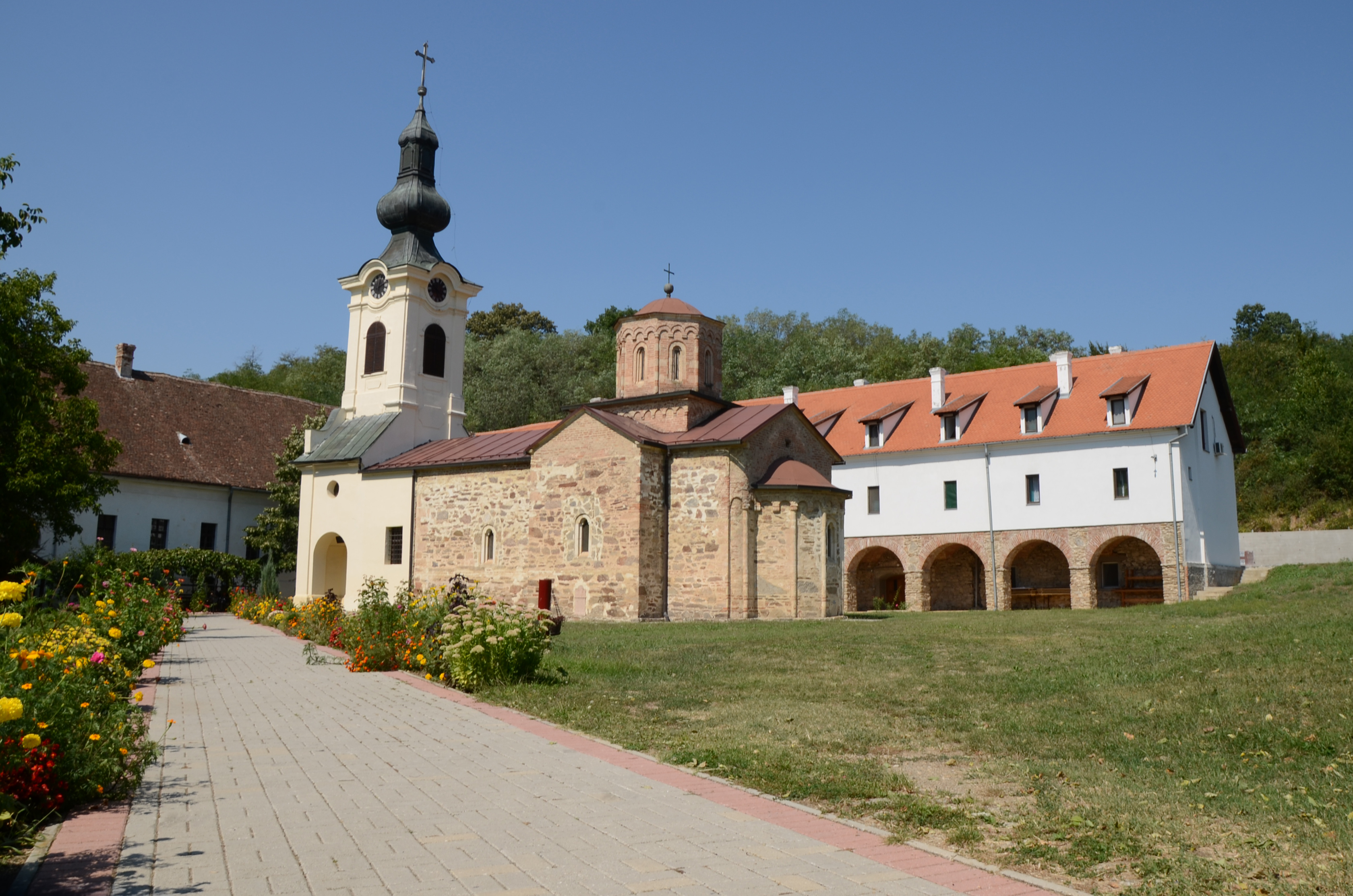
Mesic Monastery

The Mesić Monastery (Serbian: Манастир Месић, romanized: Manastir Mesić; Romanian: Manastirea Mesici) is a Serb Orthodox monastery situated in the Banat region, in the province of Vojvodina, Serbia. The monastery is situated near the village of Mesić, in the Vršac municipality. It was founded in the 15th century, although legend holds that it was built in 1225 by Arsenije Bogdanović of the Hilandar.

Mesić Monastery was declared Monument of Culture of Exceptional Importance in 1990, and it is protected by the state.

== See also ==
- List of Serbian Orthodox monasteries
