= Memorial Ossuary, Mačkov kamen =

WWI memorial near Krupanj, Serbia

Coordinates: 44.3296°N 19.2925°E

Memorial Ossuary Mačkov kamen
- Serbia
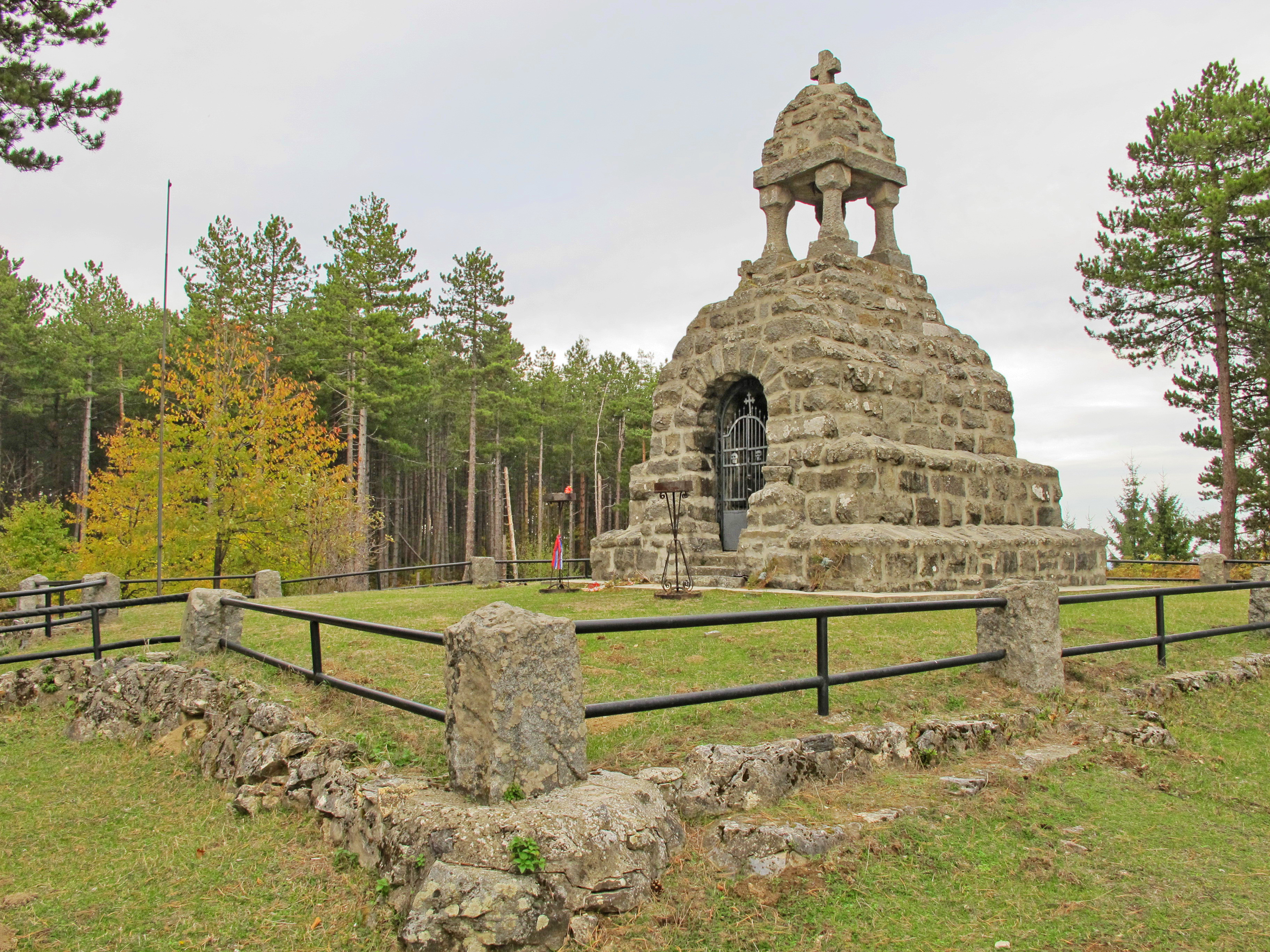
- Memorial ossuary
- For World War I heroes
- Established: 1928–1932
- Location: Jagodnja near Krupanj, Serbia

Cultural Heritage of Serbia
- Official name: "Mačkov Kamen" Complex
- Type: Cultural Monument of Exceptional Importance
- Designated: 25 November 1976
- Reference no.: SK 1469

Memorial Ossuary Mačkov kamen (Serbian Cyrillic: Maчков камен) is a memorial monument located near Krupanj, Serbia, which stands on the mountain Jagodnja at an elevation of 923 m (Mačkov kamen – Tomcat's Stone). The remains of fallen soldiers from the First World War are stored inside.

== History ==
The memorial ossuary is located at the top of the Mačkov kamen. Its construction began in 1925. The initiative was launched by the Minister of Construction, Milorad Vujičić. Committee members were Ljuba Jovanović (President of the Assembly), Đorđe Vajfert (Governor of the National Bank), and Dr. Arčibald Rajs and most respected citizens of Rađevina and Azbukovica. The memorial ossuary was designed by architect Momir Korunović and creator Šime Franović and was finally built in 1929. Transfer of the bones of fallen soldiers was organized in August 1931, with permission from the Ministry of the Army.
