= Museum of 4 July =

- Muzej "4. juli"
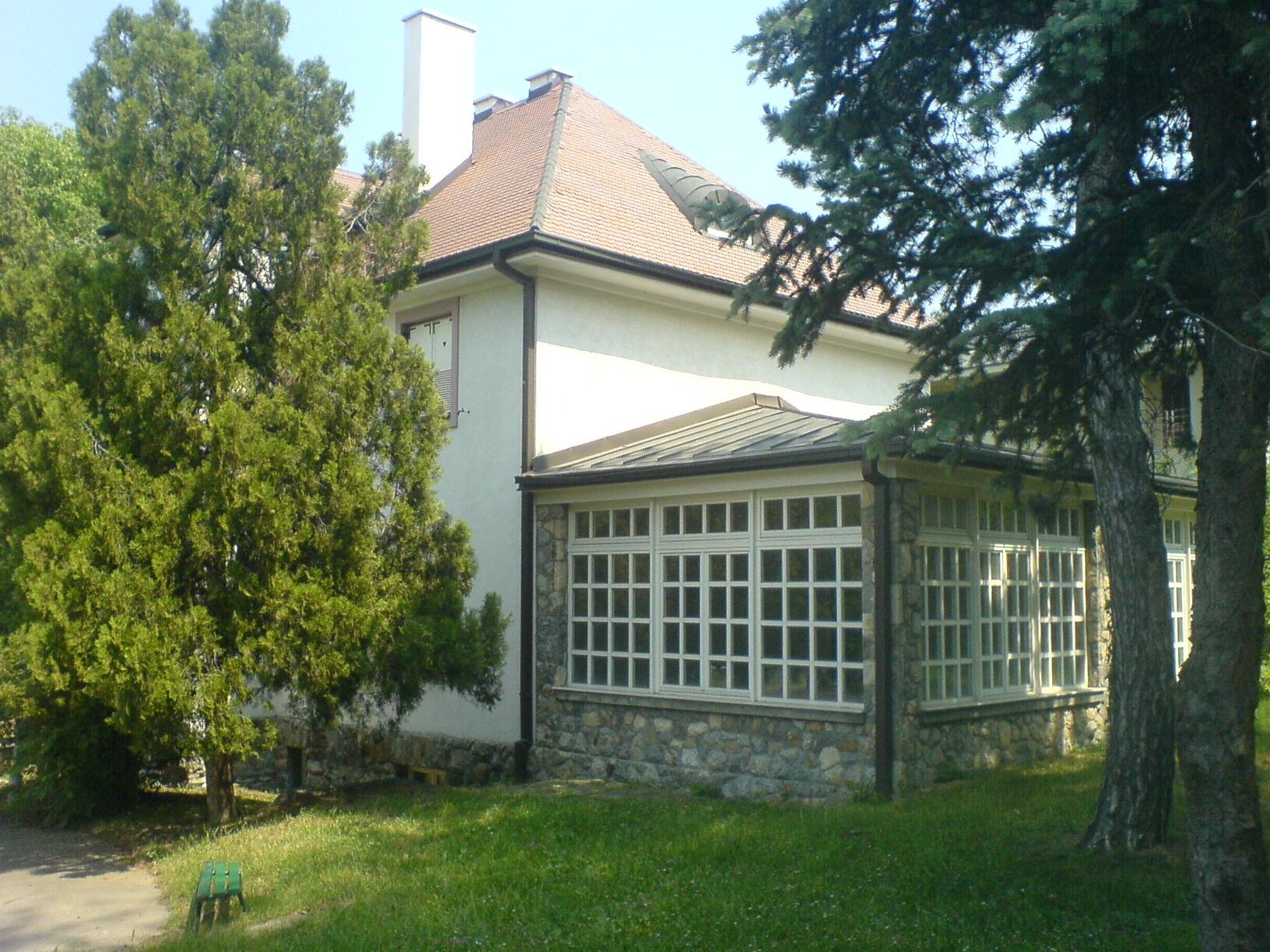
- Building of former Museum of 4 July

- Location within Belgrade
- Established: 1 May 1950
- Dissolved: 2003
- Location: Belgrade, Serbia
- Coordinates: 44.809122°N 20.466156°E
- Type: Historic house museum

Cultural Heritage of Serbia
- Type: Cultural Monument of Exceptional Importance
- Designated: 17 May 1965
- Reference no.: СК 52

The Museum of 4 July was a museum located in Belgrade, the capital of Serbia. It was established in 1950 in the house where members of the Central Committee of the Communist Party of Yugoslavia decided to encourage the people's uprising against Yugoslavia's German occupiers on 4 July 1941. That date was later dubbed Fighter's Day, a public holiday during the existence of Socialist Federal Republic of Yugoslavia.

Located at number 10/A Prince Alexander Karađorđević Boulevard, the museum opened on 1 May 1950. The building is marked by a memorial plaque. A monument entitled Call of the Uprising, sculpted by Vojin Bakić, adorns the front of the building. It was closed in 2003, after the property was returned to the Ribnikar family.

== History ==
The house was built in 1934 by Vladislav Ribnikar. Before the outbreak of World War II, a shelter was buried in the back yard, and the building itself was prepared as a base for illegal operations. In the first years of the war, it hid illegal immigrants. and for some time was used by the Yugoslav Partisans (NOVJ).

In 1943, after Vladislav and his wife Jara departed with the Partisans, the house was confiscated and occupied by German officers.

After Yugoslavia was liberated at the end of World War II, the Germans left the house empty and vandalized. Ribnikar gave the house to the Communist Party of Yugoslavia to form a museum.

The Republic of Serbia declared the building a Monument of Culture of Exceptional Importance in 1979, granting it protected status.

In 2003, the museum was closed, and the property was returned to the Ribnikar family. Also, in the same year, Ribnikar Fond decided to use the old Museum building, and opened a new museum, called "Museum of Politika and Serbian press".

== Notable residents ==
- Edvard Kardelj
- Vladimir Dedijer
- Ivo Lola Ribar
- Josip Broz Tito, lived on the first floor

== See also ==
- Monument of Culture of Exceptional Importance
- List of museums in Serbia
