= Mesić (Vršac) =

Mesić Месић (Serbian) Mesici (Romanian)
- Village (Selo)
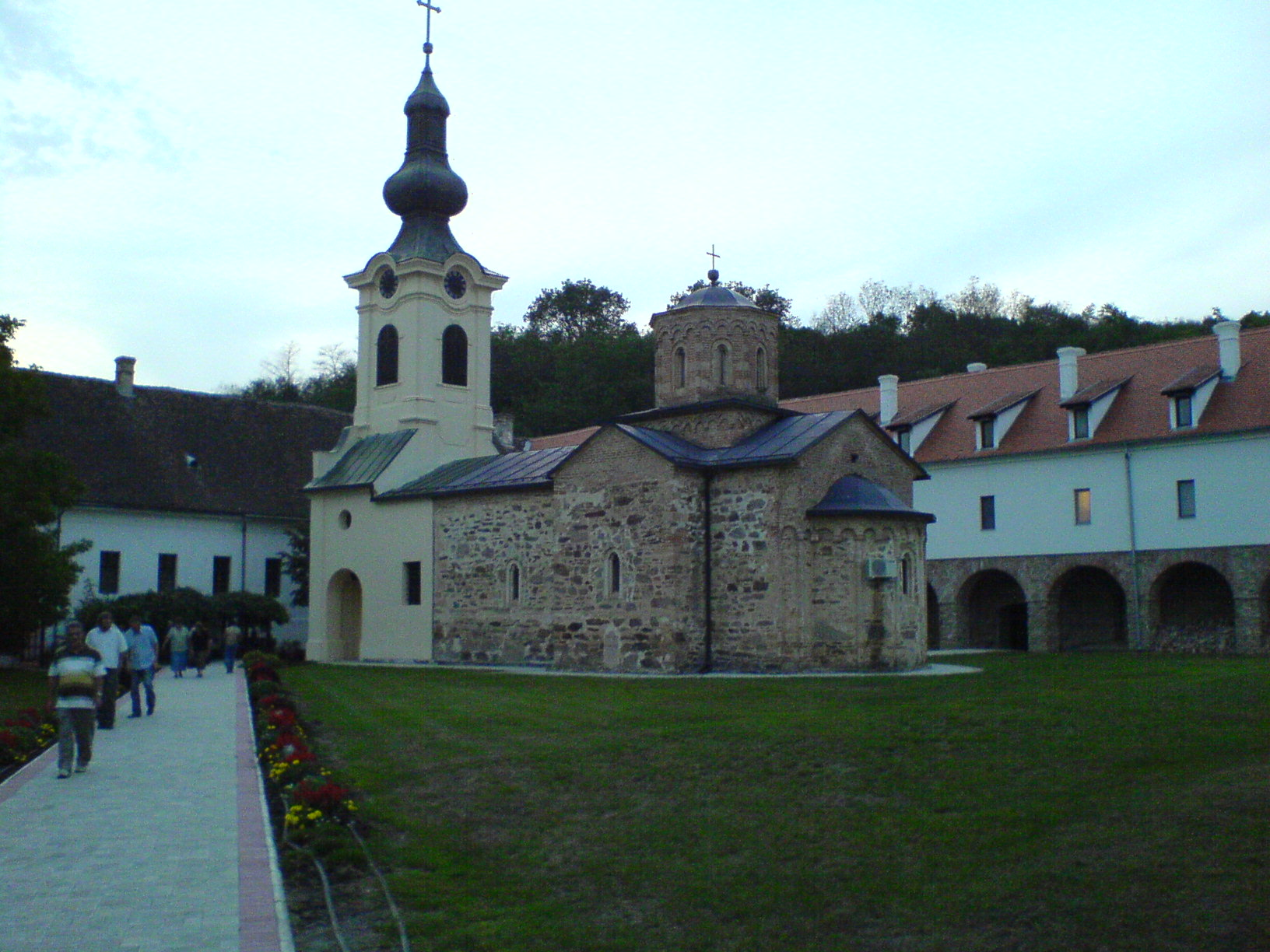
- Mesić Monastery

- Location of Mesić within Serbia Mesić (Serbia) Mesić (Europe)
- Coordinates: 45°06′17″N 21°24′01″E
- Country: Serbia
- Province: Vojvodina
- District: South Banat
- Municipality: Vršac
- Elevation: 197 m (646 ft)

Population (2022)
  - Total: 186
- Time zone: UTC+1 (CET)
  - Summer (DST): UTC+2 (CEST)
- Area code: +381(0)13
- Car plates: VŠ

Mesić (Serbian Cyrillic: Месић; Romanian: Mesici; Hungarian: Meszesfalu) is a village located in the administrative area of the City of Vršac, South Banat District, Vojvodina, Serbia. The village has a population of 186 people (2022 census). The village is best known for the Serbian Orthodox Mesić Monastery.

== Demographics ==
=== Historical population ===
- 1961: 470
- 1971: 431
- 1981: 392
- 1991: 347
- 2002: 227
- 2022: 186

=== Ethnic groups ===
According to data from the 2022 census, ethnic groups in the village include:

- 150 (80.6%) Romanians
- 30 (16.1%) Serbs
- Others/Undeclared/Unknown

== See also ==
- List of places in Serbia
- List of cities, towns and villages in Vojvodina
