= Church of the Transfiguration of the Lord, Pančevo =

Church of the Transfiguration of the Lord
- Црква преображења Господњег
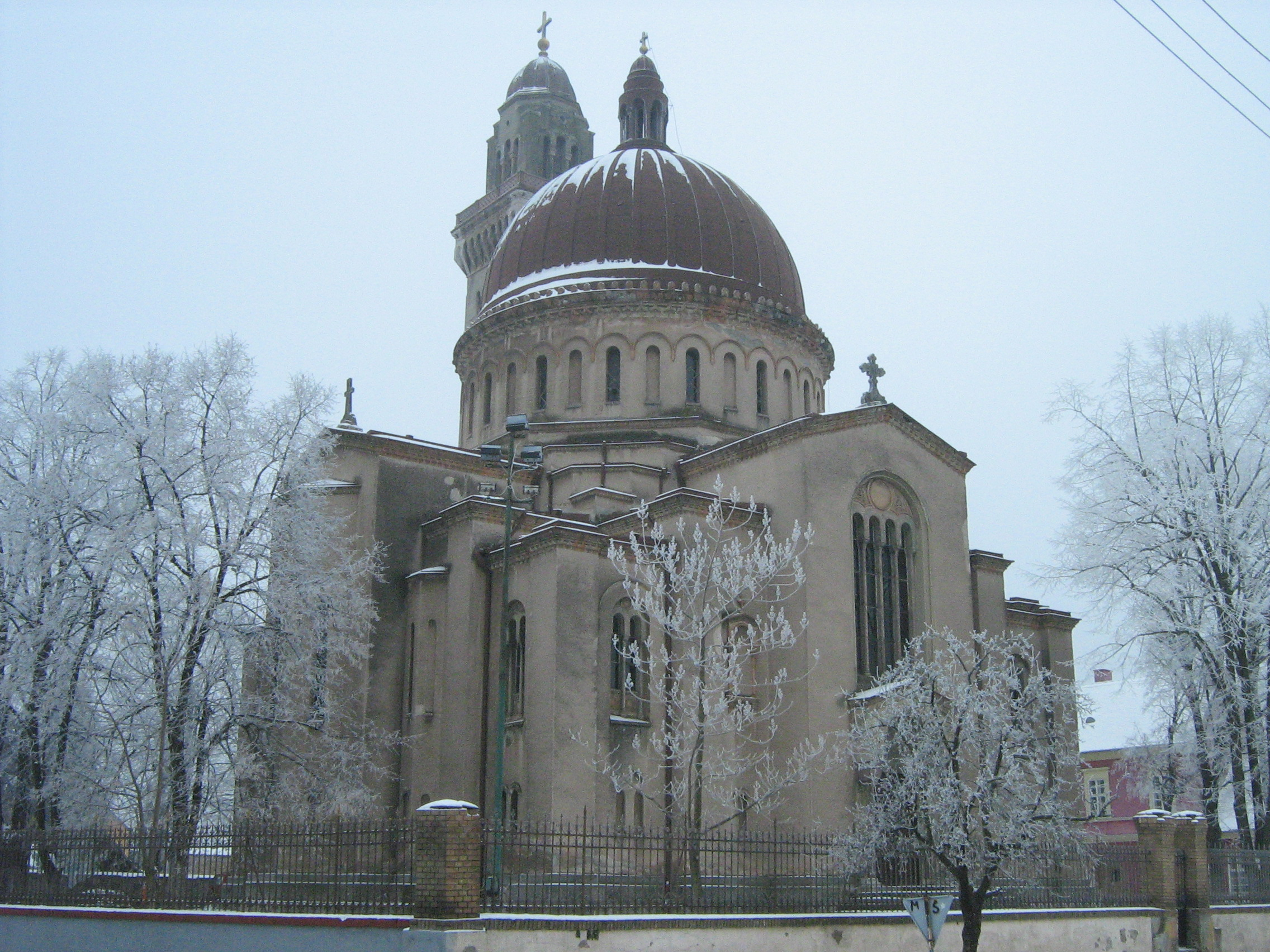
- Church of the Transfiguration of the Lord
- Church of the Transfiguration of the Lord
- 44°52′40″N 20°37′54″E
- Location: Pančevo, Vojvodina
- Country: Serbia
- Denomination: Serbian Orthodox

History
- Status: Church
- Dedication: Transfiguration of the Lord

Architecture
- Functional status: Active
- Architect: Svetozar Ivačković
- Style: Byzantine Revival architecture
- Years built: 1878

Administration
- Archdiocese: Eparchy of Banat

Cultural Heritage of Serbia
- Type: Cultural Monument of Great Importance
- Designated: 1997
- Reference no.: СК 1051

The Church of the Transfiguration of the Lord (Serbian: Црква преображења Господњег) in Pančevo is Serbian Orthodox church in Vojvodina, Serbia. The church was built at the same site where an earlier Serbian Orthodox church stood before.

== History ==
Serbian community constructed the first wooden church at the same area in 1717, not long after the 1690 Great Migration of the Serbs. In 1743, a brick church replaced the original wooden structure, though it lacked a tower. During the Austro-Turkish War in 1788, the church was burned down but was later rebuilt with a tower. However, the tower collapsed in 1843, leading to the church’s closure. In 1873, construction began on the present-day church designed by architect Svetozar Ivačković in a Neo-Byzantine style incorporating Romanesque, Gothic, and Serbian Moravian elements. It was the first of its kind in Vojvodina, aiming to revive Serbian medieval architecture.

Construction was completed in 1878. Interior decoration began in 1906, led by Milorad Ruvidić, Branko Tanazević, and Petar Bajalović, following the Moravian style with influences from the monasteries of Hilandar and Kalenić Monastery. The dome was once covered in fish-scale lead plates, removed for the Austro-Hungarian World War I efforts in 1916 and re-roofed with copper in 2009.

== Protection ==
Building's protection history dates back to June 21, 1948, when the Institute for the Protection and Scientific Study of Cultural Monuments of the People's Republic of Serbia issued its first preservation ruling (No. 992/48). The church was later registered in the Central Register of Cultural Monuments on December 22, 1993 (No. SK 1051) and subsequently included in the Local Register on December 19, 1997 (No. 1) under the jurisdiction of the Institute for the Protection of Cultural Monuments of Pančevo. The Official Gazette of the Republic of Serbia (16/90) formally confirmed its status as a cultural monument.

== See also ==
- Eparchy of Banat
- Church of the Assumption of the Theotokos, Pančevo
