= Sibač =

Sibač Сибач (Serbian)
- Village (Selo)
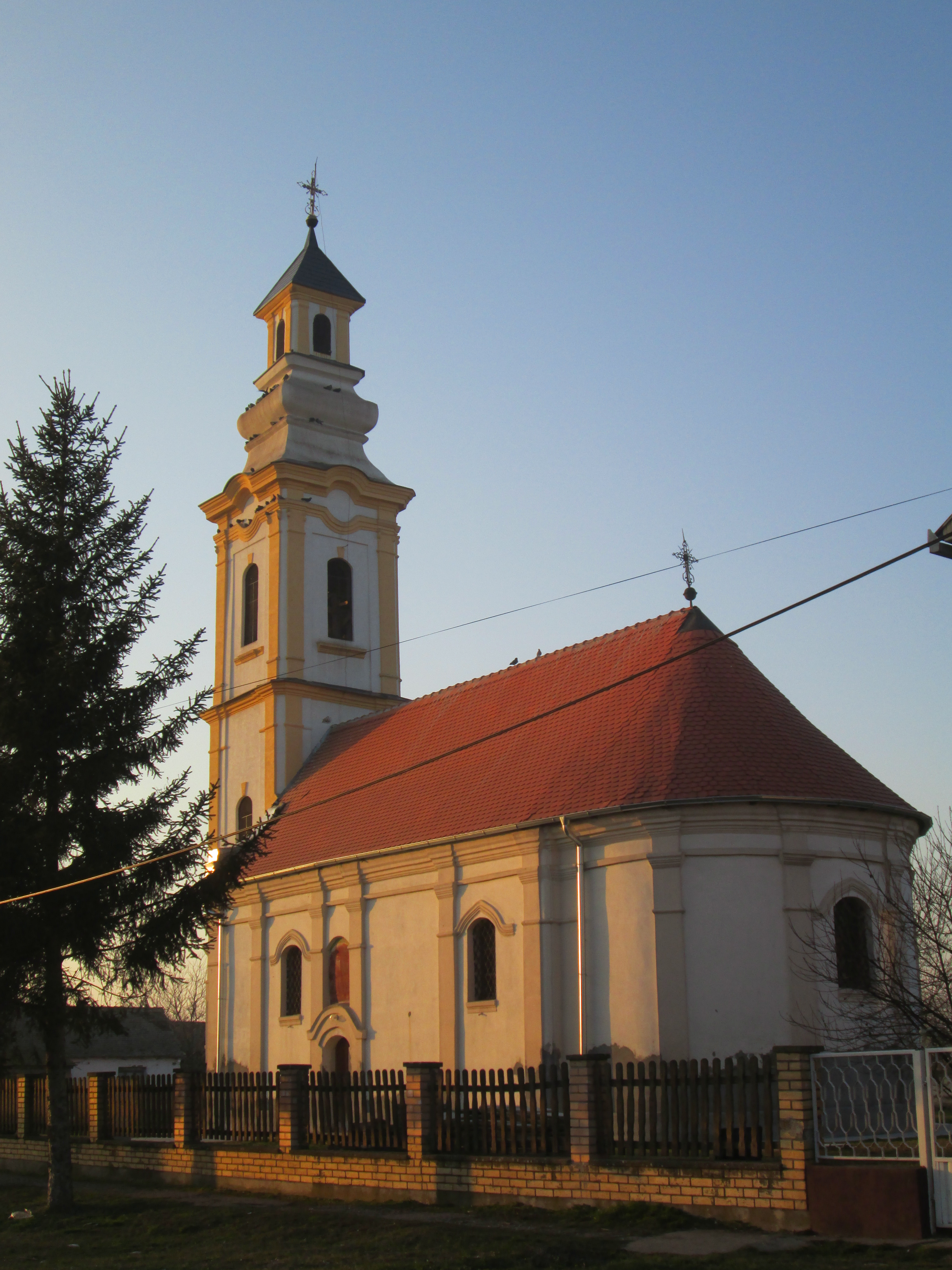
- Church of St. Nicholas

- Location within Vojvodina Location within Serbia Location within Europe
- Coordinates: 44°54′N 19°56′E
- Country: Serbia
- Province: Vojvodina
- District: Srem
- Municipality: Pećinci

Population (2002)
  - Total: 544
- Time zone: UTC+1 (CET)
  - Summer (DST): UTC+2 (CEST)

Sibač (Serbian Cyrillic: Сибач) is a village in Serbia. It is situated in the Pećinci municipality, in the Srem District, Vojvodina province. The village has a Serb ethnic majority and its population numbering 544 people (2002 census).

== See also ==
- List of places in Serbia
- List of cities, towns and villages in Vojvodina
