= Church of St. Nicholas, Sibač =

Church of St. Nicholas
- Crkva svetog Nikole; Црква светог Николе
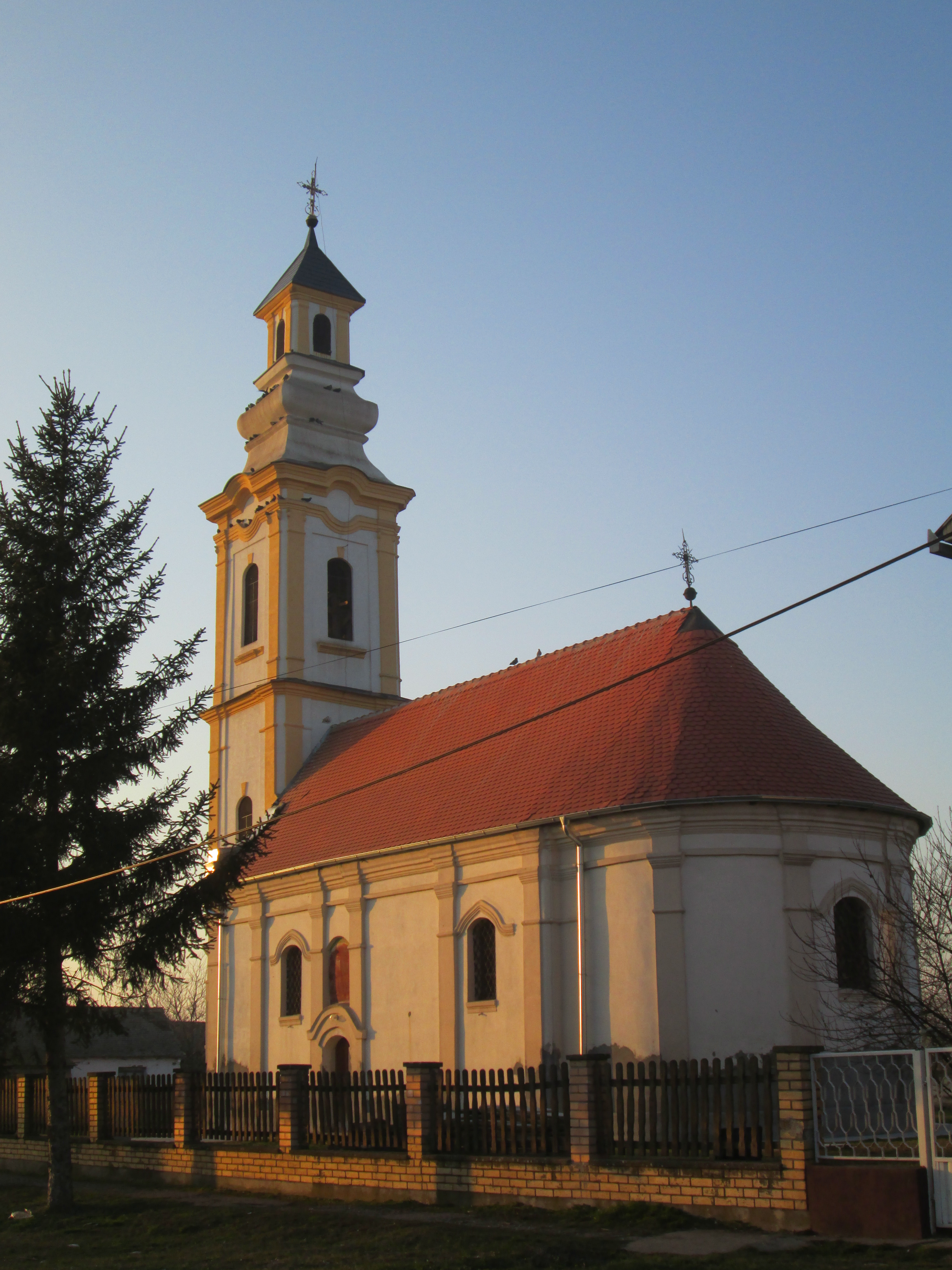
- Church of St Nicholas

- Shown within Vojvodina/Serbia Church of St. Nicholas (Serbia)
- 44°54′21″N 19°56′12″E
- Location: Sibač, Vojvodina

Cultural Heritage of Serbia
- Type: Cultural Monument of Great Importance
- Designated: 30 December 1997
- Reference no.: СК 1052
- Country: Serbia
- Denomination: Serbian Orthodox

History
- Status: Church
- Dedication: St. Nicholas

Architecture
- Functional status: Active
- Style: Neo-classicism
- Years built: second half of the 18th century

Administration
- Archdiocese: Eparchy of Srem

Church of St. Nicholas (Serbian: Црква светог Николе) in Sibač is Serbian Orthodox church in Vojvodina, Serbia. The church was built in the second half of the 18th century. The iconostasis, created in the first half of the 18th century, was brought to Sibač from the Lower Church in Sremski Karlovci and adapted to the existing altar space. In 1851, it was generally renovated and painted for the first time. Throne icons, imperial doors, enlarged Deisis and prophets were painted in the first half of the 18th century by Georgije Stojanović.

== See also ==
- Eparchy of Srem
