= Church of St. Demetrius, Sremska Mitrovica =

Church of Saint Demetrius
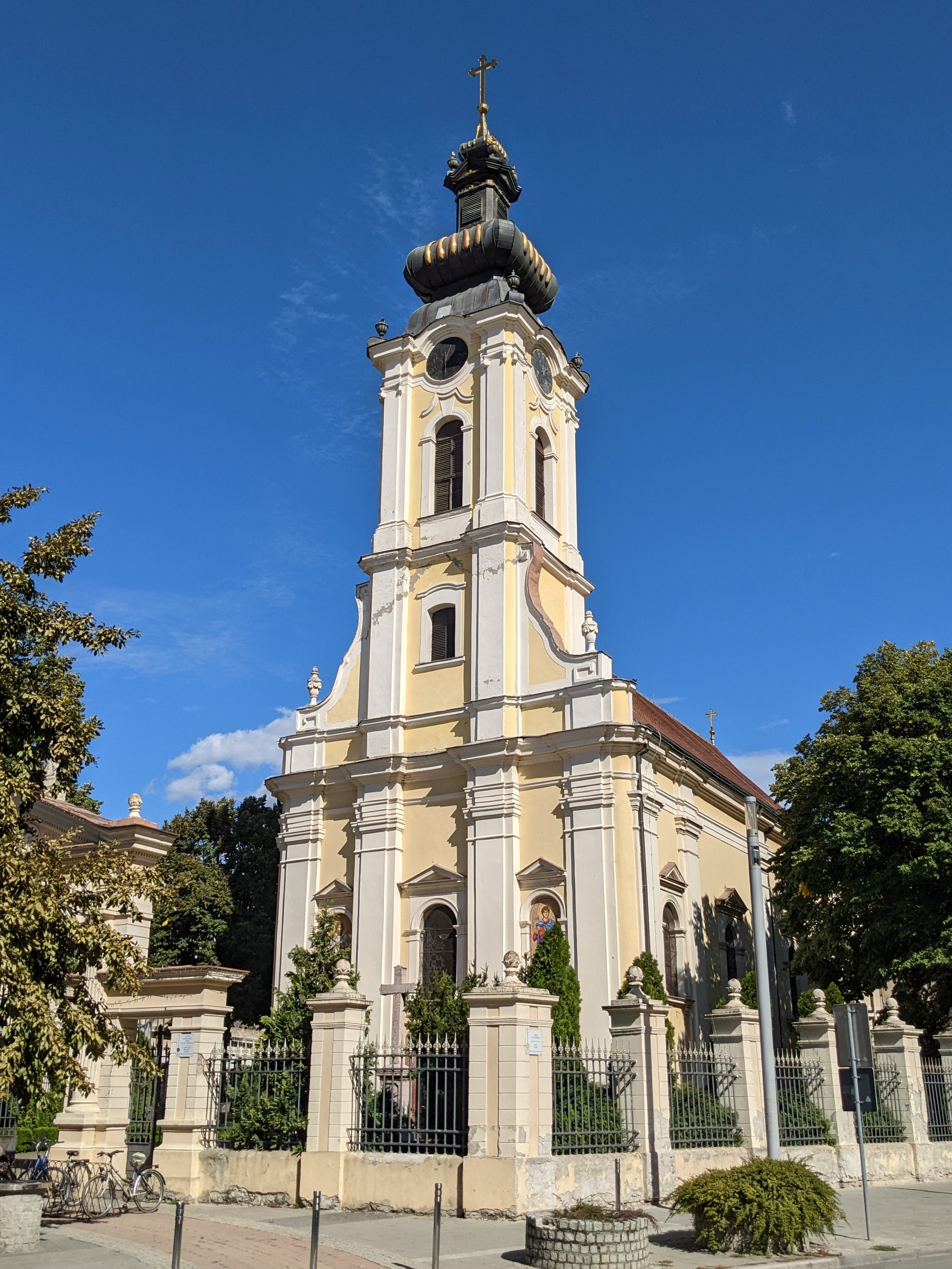
- Church of Saint Demetrius, pictured in 2022
- Church of Saint Demetrius
- 44°58′03″N 19°36′22″E
- Location: Sremska Mitrovica
- Country: Serbia
- Denomination: Serbian Orthodox

History
- Status: Church
- Dedication: Demetrius of Sirmium

Architecture
- Functional status: Active
- Years built: 1794

Administration
- Archdiocese: Eparchy of Srem

The Church of Saint Demetrius (Serbian: Црква светог Димитрија, romanized: Crkva svetog Dimitrija), locally known as the New Orthodox Church or the Great Church, is a Serbian Orthodox church in the city Sremska Mitrovica, Serbia. The belongs to the Eparchy of Srem of the Serbian Orthodox Church and is dedicated to the city's patron saint, St. Demetrius, after whom the city is named. It has been declared an Immovable Cultural Monument of Great Importance.

== Architecture ==
The church is designed with a single-nave layout, featuring a spacious semicircular apse at the east end and a tall bell tower rising above the western façade. Over the years the building has undergone numerous interventions, the first of which took place in 1811. The church was originally dedicated to St. Stephen yet it was later rededicated to St. Demetrius in 1997. St. Demetrius was a deacon of Bishop Irenaeus, and both were executed by Roman legionaries on one of the bridges over the Sava River in imperial Sirmium in 204 AD.

== See also ==
- Eparchy of Srem
