= Kraljevački October Memorial Park =

Memorial park in Kraljevo, Serbia

Coordinates: 43°43′49″N 20°41′32″E

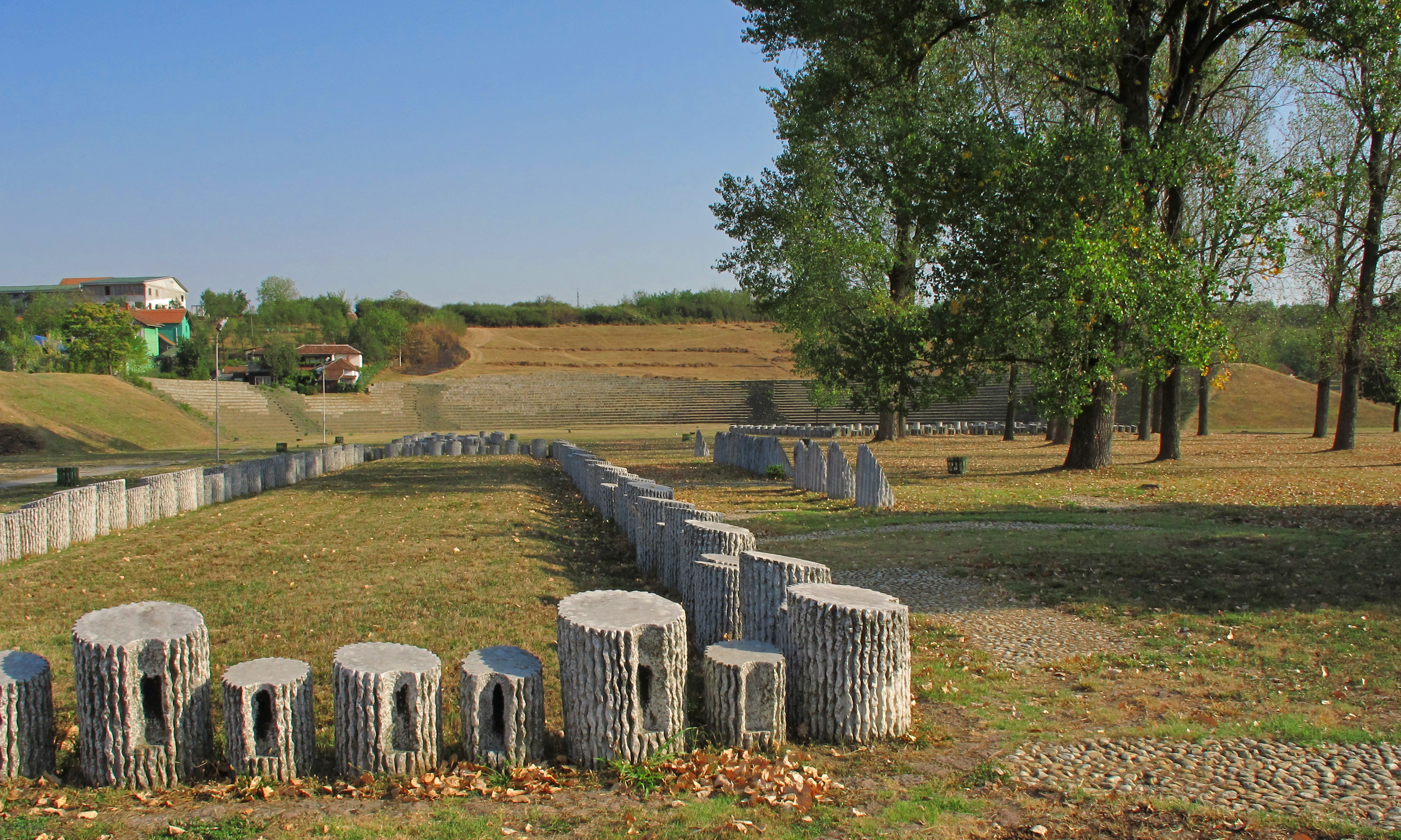
Memorial Park

The "Kraljevački oktobar" memorial park (also known as the "14th October" memorial park) is dedicated to the citizens of Kraljevo who were shot by the Wehrmacht from October 15 to 20, 1941.

== History ==
After the creation of a large liberated territory in central Serbia, known as the Užice Republic, the Wehrmacht command launched an offensive aimed at destroying the free territory and the anti-fascist resistance movement. In order to suppress the uprising, an order was issued to shoot one hundred people for one killed German soldier. By October 4, the German army entered Kraljevo and locked up its employees in the locomotive hall on the grounds of the wagon factory. As constant attacks by Partisan-Chetnik forces followed, the German command began executing the order "one hundred for one" killed, that is, 50 for one wounded German.

The shootings began on October 15, after a state of emergency was introduced in the city, and lasted until October 20. It is estimated that around 3,000 inhabitants of Kraljevo died during the shooting, of which 2,190 people are known by name. Of these, there were at least 102 persons under the age of 18, 29 women, and at least 1,840 persons between the ages of 18 and 55.

== Monument Park ==
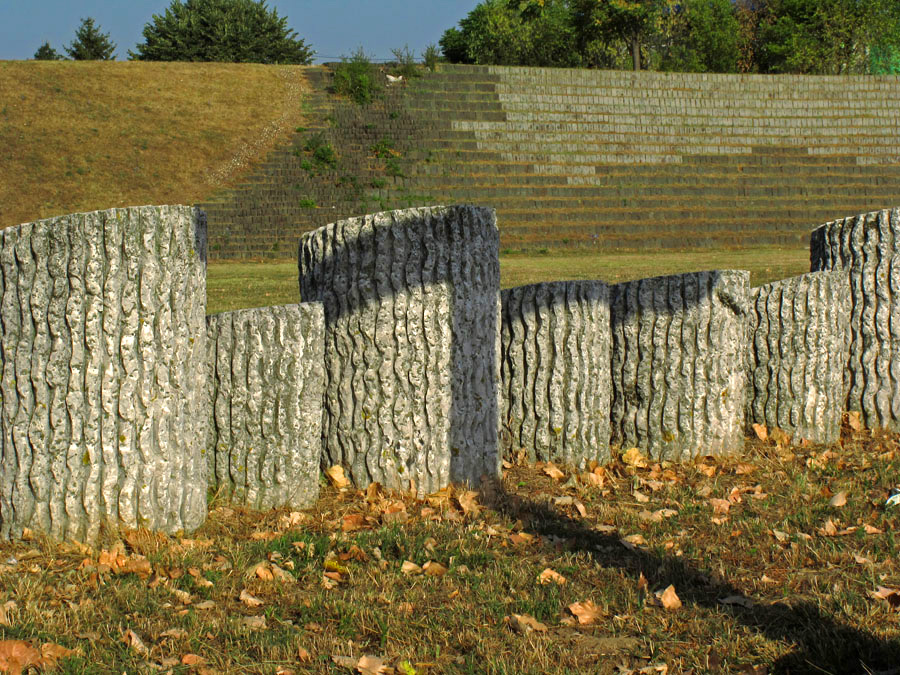

At the end of the 1960s, an action was launched to mark the area where the shootings took place in a dignified manner. Architects Spasoje Krunić and Dragutin Kovačević won the first prize at the competition for the conceptual design of the memorial park. The arrangement of the memorial park was completed in 1970. The park covers an area of 12 hectares.

In the area near the mass graves, a memorial complex was built in the form of several columns of stone sculptures, which were made to resemble felled trees. This is a symbol of the sudden end of the lives of the people of Kraljevo who were executed in 1941. At the places of mass graves, earthen mounds covered with grass were erected. The central monument, together with the auditorium, forms an amphitheater space intended for the holding of special events.

== The National Museum ==
In 1950, the National Museum of Kraljevo was founded, which, among other things, deals with the collection and preservation of documents related to the executions of the people of Kraljevo in 1941.
