= Lužnice, Kragujevac =

Lužnice Лужнице (Serbian)
- Municipality and Town
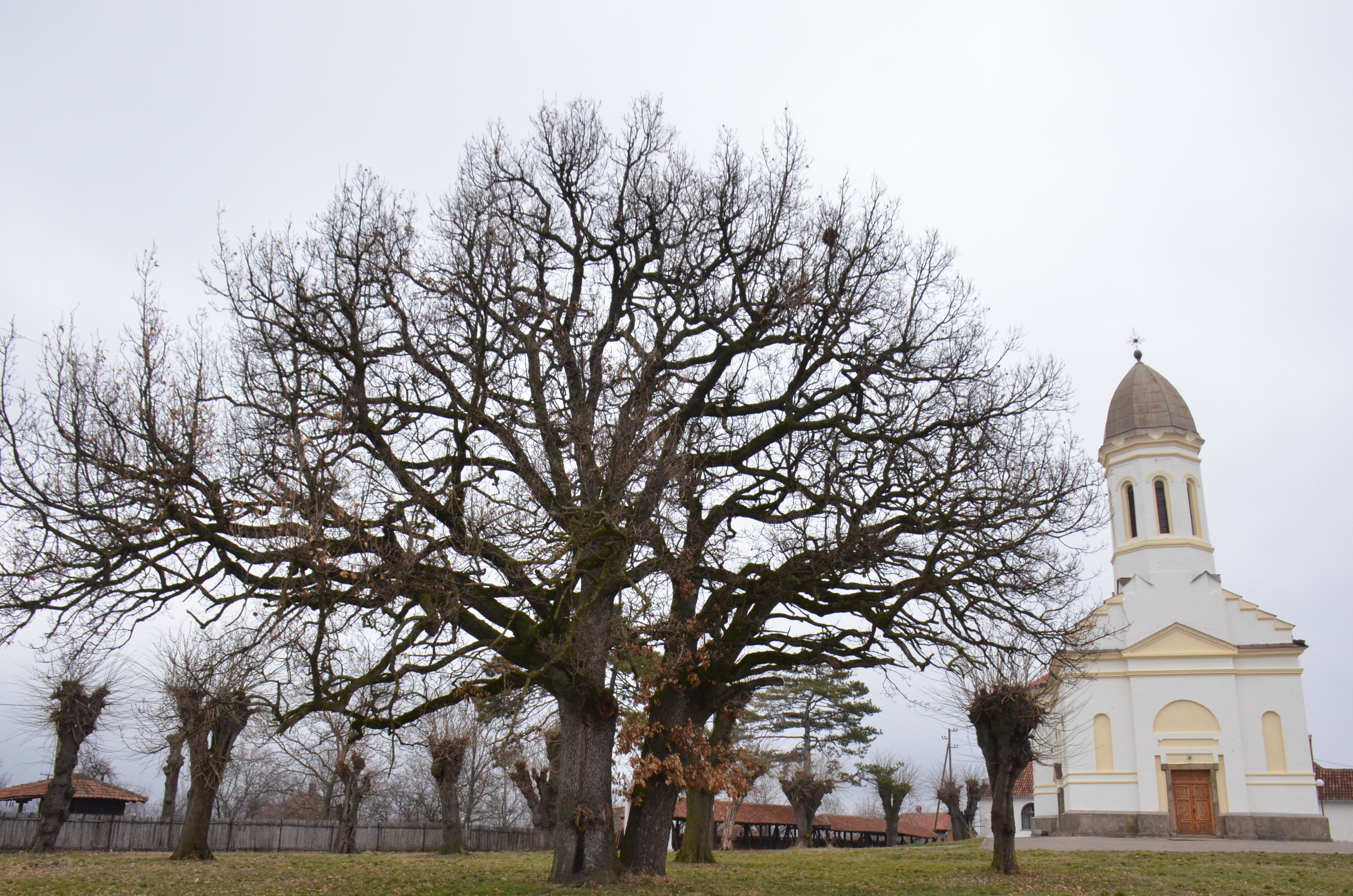
- Zapis in front of the village church
- Interactive map of Lužnice
- Coordinates: 44.1167°N 20.8167°E
- Country: Serbia
- District: Šumadija

Population (2011 census)
  - Town: 1,065
- Time zone: UTC+1 (CET)
  - Summer (DST): UTC+2 (CEST)
- Postal code: 34000
- Area code: +381

Lužnice (Serbian: Лужнице) is a settlement in the Aerodrom municipality of the city of Kragujevac in central Serbia. The population numbers at 981 (2011 census), down from 1064 (2003 census).
