= Ubožac Monastery =

Orthodox monastery near Močare, Serbia

Ubožac Monastery Манастир Убожац
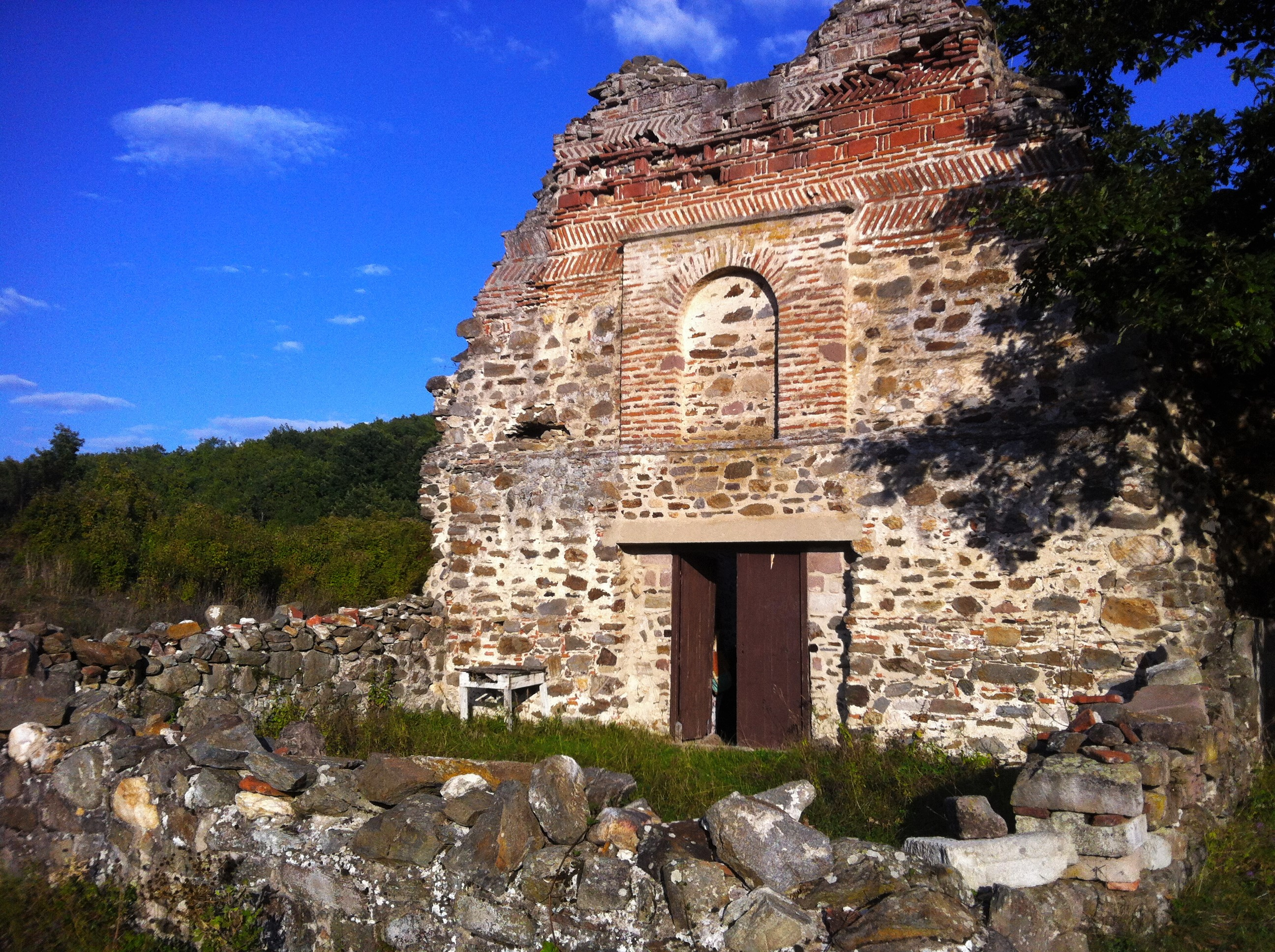
- Interactive map of Ubožac Monastery; Манастир Убожац

Monastery information
- Full name: Манастир - Убожац
- Order: Serbian Orthodox
- Established: 14th century
- Dedication: Presentation of the Blessed Virgin Mary

People
- Founder: Jelena Dečanska

Site
- Location: Močare
- Coordinates: 42.5978°N 21.5947°E
- Public access: No

Ubožac or Rđavac Monastery is a former Serbian Orthodox monastery, the ruins of which are located near the village of Močare, Serbia, not far from Kosovska Kamenica. The time of its creation is not known, and in scientific circles its rise is placed either in the middle of the 14th century or during the Ottoman rule. According to tradition, the founder is St. Jelena Dečanska.

== Architecture ==
The church dedicated to the Presentation of the Blessed Virgin Mary has a triconchos base with regular apses, a narthex and a dome, which once rested on free supports. In its construction, properly cut stones, decorative patterning using bricks, as well as stone interweaving made of non-fluted strips were used. To the west of the church, there are the remains of a dining room that had a basement, to the north and south are the remains of a guest house with a porch, and within the complex there are also two multi-story towers.
