= Jagodnja =

Mountain in Serbia

- Location within Serbia

Highest point
- Elevation: 939 m (3,081 ft)
- Coordinates: 44°20′39″N 19°17′37″E

Geography
- Location: Western Serbia
- Parent range: Dinaric Alps

Jagodnja (Serbian Cyrillic: Јагодња) is a mountain in western Serbia, near the town of Krupanj. Its highest peak, Košutnja stopa, has an elevation of 939 meters above sea level.

The peak of Mačkov kamen (923 m) was the site of one of bloodiest battles in World War I between Serbian and Austro-Hungarian armies, during the Battle of the Drina. There is a monument, Memorial Ossuary, dedicated to the fallen Serbian soldiers.

== See also ==
- List of mountains in Serbia
