= Pilatovići =

Pilatovići Пилатовићи
- Village
- Location within Serbia
- Coordinates: 43°50′17″N 20°06′03″E
- Country: Serbia
- District: Zlatibor District
- Municipality: Požega

Area
  - Total: 11.6 km^{2} (4.5 sq mi)

Population (2022)
  - Total: 621
  - Density: 53.5/km^{2} (139/sq mi)
- Time zone: UTC+1 (CET)
  - Summer (DST): UTC+2 (CEST)

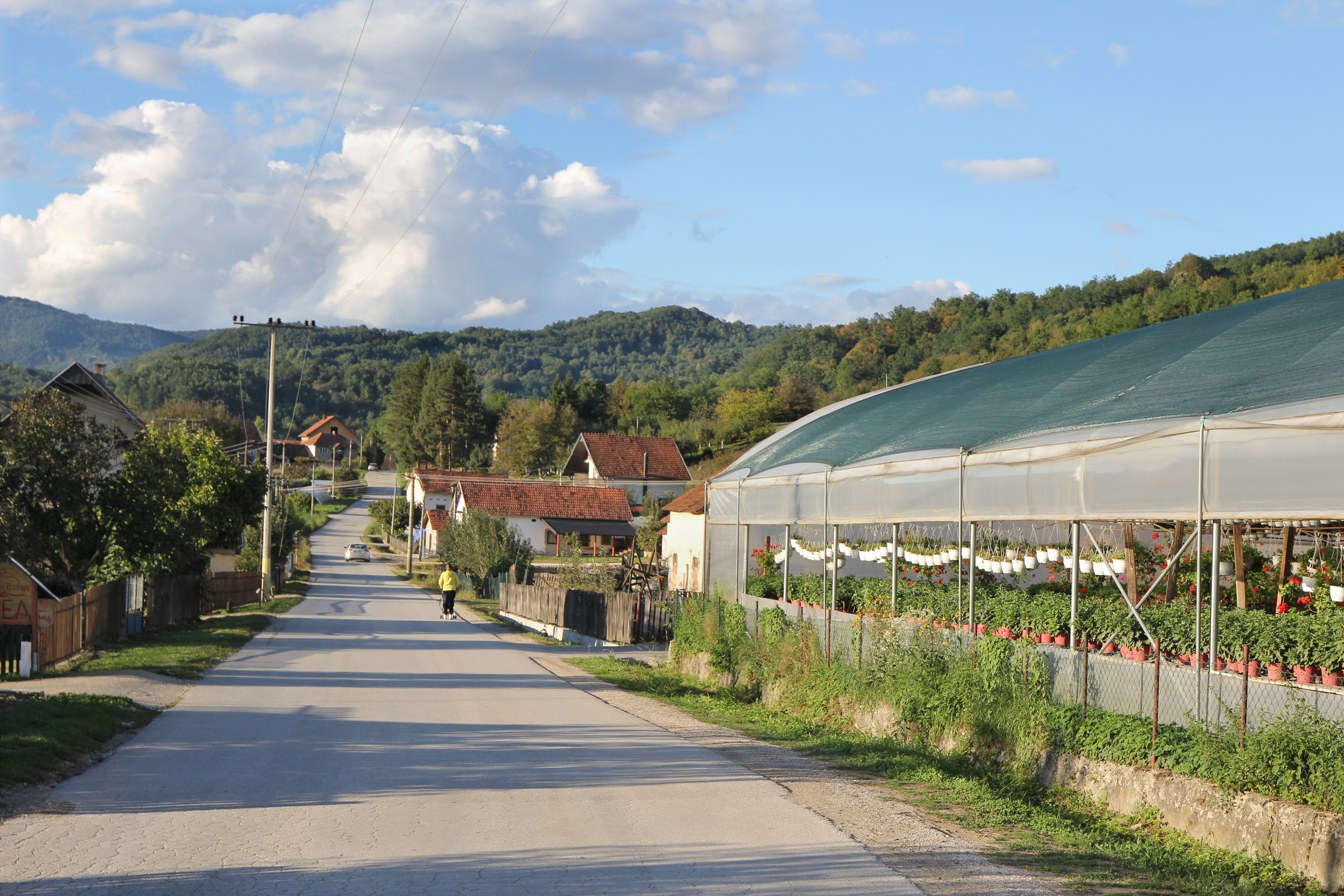
Photo of the village.

Pilatovići is a village in the municipality of Požega, western Serbia. According to the 2022 census, the village has a population of 621 people.
