= Brodica =

Brodica Бродица Brogița
- Village
- Location within Serbia
- Coordinates: 44°29′18″N 21°49′08″E
- Country: Serbia
- District: Braničevo District
- Municipality: Kučevo

Population (2022)
  - Total: 259
- Time zone: UTC+1 (CET)
  - Summer (DST): UTC+2 (CEST)

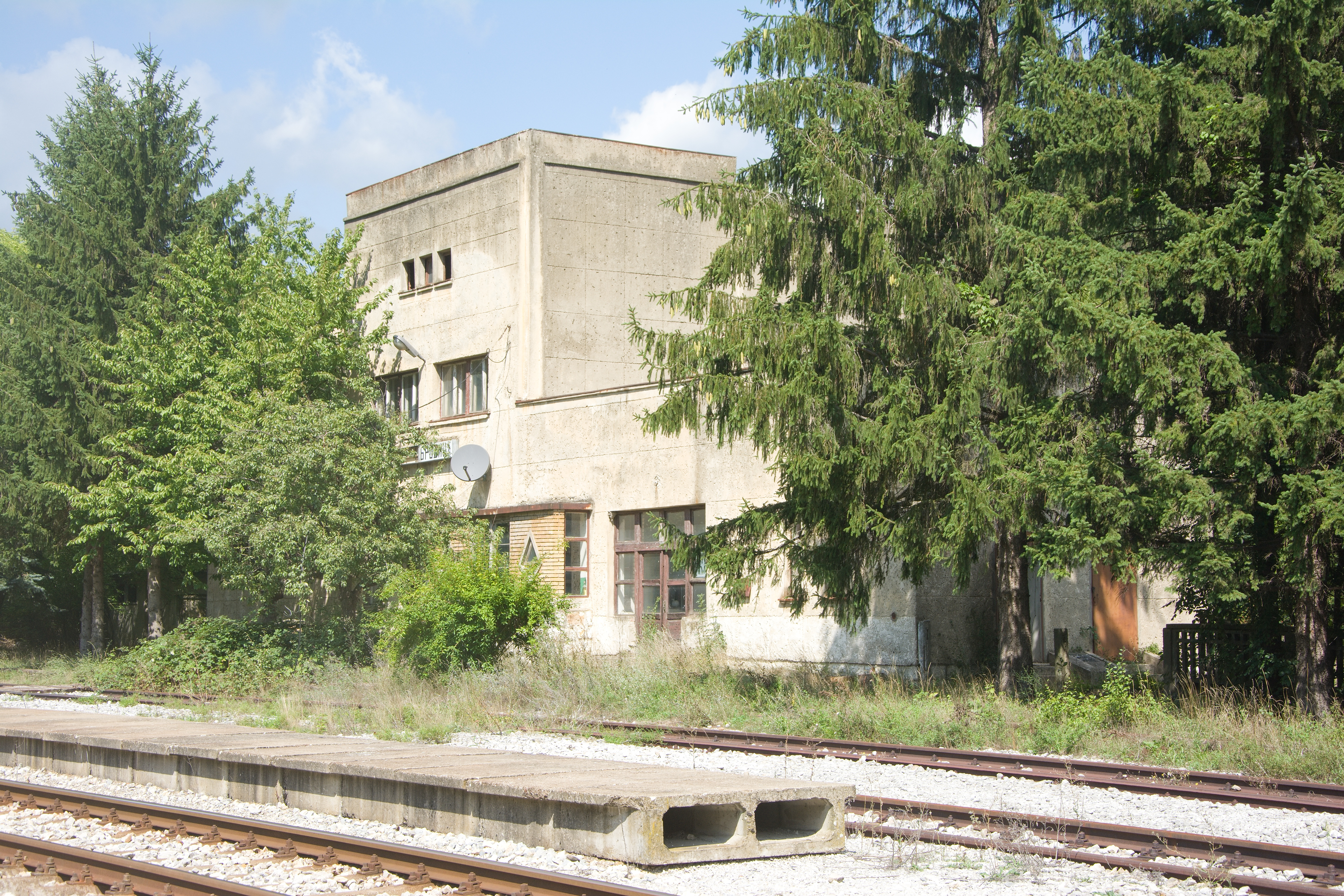
Brodica railway station, Serbia

Brodica (Serbian Cyrillic: Бродица; Romanian: Brogița) is a village in the municipality of Kučevo, Serbia. It has a population of 259 inhabitants (2022 census), a majority of them Vlachs.
