= Anti-Serb sentiment =

Prejudice against Serbs

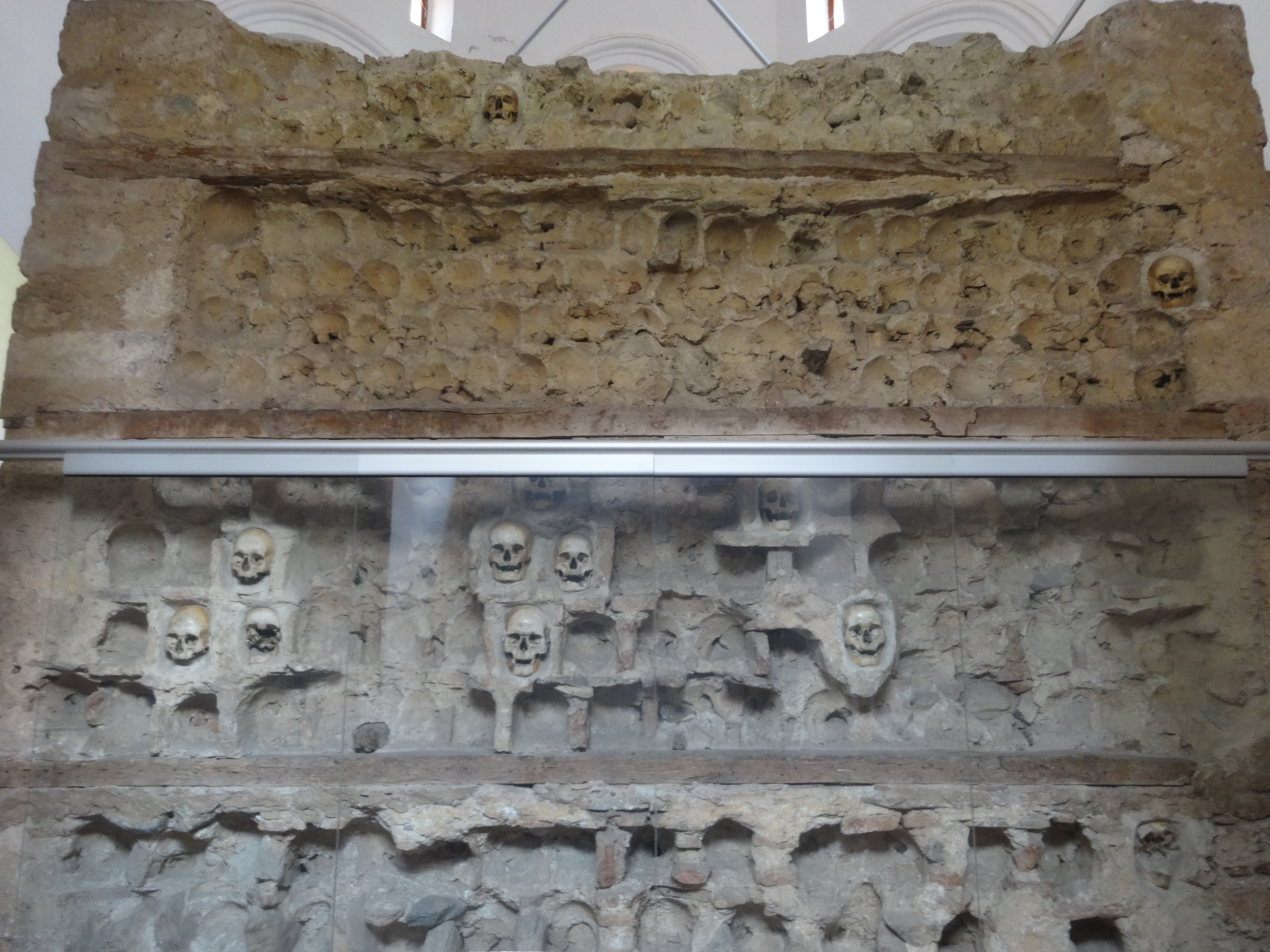
The Skull Tower in Niš. Following the Battle of Čegar (1809), it was built from the heads of massacred Serbs by the order of the Ottoman general Hurshid Pasha.

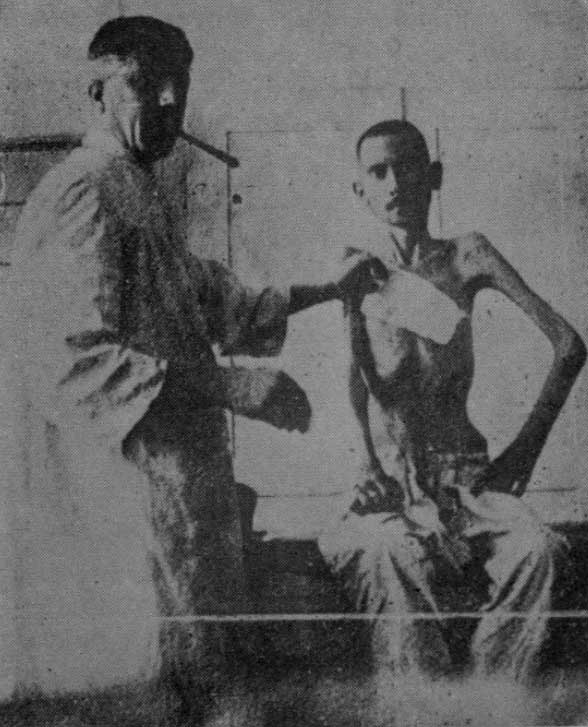
WWI A Starved Serbian Prisoner of War, taken by an Italian factor in Austria

Anti-Serb sentiment or Serbophobia (Serbian: србофобија, romanized: srbofobija) refers to negative attitudes, prejudice or discrimination towards Serbs as an ethnic group. Historically, it has been a basis for the persecution, ethnic cleansing, and genocide of ethnic Serbs.

A distinctive form of anti-Serb sentiment is anti-Serbian sentiment, which can be defined as hostility to, prejudice towards, or discrimination against Serbia as a nation-state for Serbs. Additionally, another form of anti-Serb sentiment is discrimination or bias against Republika Srpska, the Serb-majority entity in Bosnia and Herzegovina.

Among the most widely-known historical proponents of anti-Serb sentiment was the 19th- and 20th-century Croatian Party of Rights. The most extreme elements of this party later became the Ustaše in the Kingdom of Yugoslavia, a Croatian fascist organization that came to power during World War II and instituted racial laws that specifically targeted Serbs, Jews, Roma and political dissidents. Their actions culminated in the genocide of Serbs and other minority groups that lived in that lived in the territory of the then-Independent State of Croatia.

The opposite of Serbophobia is Serbophilia.

== History ==
=== Before World War I ===
==== Turks and Albanians in Ottoman Kosovo Vilayet ====
Anti-Serb sentiment in the Kosovo Vilayet grew in the aftermath of the Ottoman-Serb and Ottoman-Greek conflicts during the period between 1877 and 1897. With the Battle of Vranje in 1878, thousands of Ottoman-Albanian troops and Albanian civilians were expelled into the Eastern part of Ottoman-held Kosovo Vilayet. These displaced persons, known as Muhaxir, were highly hostile towards the Serbs in the areas they had retreated to, considering that they had been expelled from the Vranje area due to the Ottoman-Serb conflict. This animosity fuelled anti-Serb sentiment, which resulted in Albanians committing widespread atrocities against Serb civilians, including physical assaults and killings, across the entire territory, including parts of Pristina and Bujanovac.

Atrocities against Serbs in the region eventually peaked in 1901 after the region was flooded with weapons that were not handed back to the Ottomans after the Greco-Turkish War of 1897. In May 1901, Albanians pillaged and partially burned the cities of Novi Pazar, Sjenica, and Pristina, and massacred Serbs in the area of Kolašin. David Little suggests that the actions of Albanians at the time constituted ethnic cleansing as they attempted to create a homogeneous area free of Christian Serbs.

==== Bulgarians in Ottoman Macedonia ====
The Society Against Serbs was a Bulgarian nationalist organization established in 1897 in Thessaloniki, Ottoman Empire. The organization's activists were both "Centralists" and "Vrhovnists" of the Bulgarian revolutionary committees (the Internal Macedonian Revolutionary Organization and the Supreme Macedonian-Adrianople Committee). By 1902, they had murdered at least 43 people and wounded 52 others, including owners of Serbian schools, teachers, Serbian Orthodox clergy, and other notable Serbs in the Ottoman Empire. Additionally, Bulgarians used the slur word "Serbomans" for people of non-Serbian origin, but with Serbian self-determination in Macedonia.

==== 19th and early 20th century in the Habsburg Croatia ====
Anti-Serbian sentiment coalesced in 19th-century Croatia when some of the Croatian intelligentsia planned the creation of a Croatian nation-state. Croatia was at the time part of the Habsburg monarchy, while since 1804, it was part of the Austrian Empire, although it remained in personal union with the Kingdom of Hungary. After the Austro-Hungarian Compromise of 1867, it eventually became part of Transleithania, while Dalmatia and Istria remained separate Austrian crown lands. Ante Starčević, the leader of the Party of Rights between 1851 and 1896, believed Croats should confront their neighbors, including Serbs. Among others, he wrote that Serbs were an "unclean race" and, with the co-founder of his party, Eugen Kvaternik, denied the existence of Serbs or Slovenes in Croatia, perceiving their political consciousness as a threat. During the 1850s, Starčević forged the term Slavoserb (Latin: sclavus, servus) to describe people supposedly ready to serve foreign rulers, initially used to refer to some Serbs and his Croat opponent, and later applied to all Serbs by his followers. The Austro-Hungarian occupation of Bosnia and Herzegovina in 1878 likely contributed to the development of Starčević's anti-Serb sentiment, as he believed that it significantly increased the chances for the establishment of Greater Croatia. David Bruce MacDonald has put forward a thesis that Starčević's theories could only justify ethnocide but not genocide because Starčević intended to assimilate Serbs as "Orthodox Croats", and not to exterminate them.

Starčević's ideas formed the basis for the destructive politics of his successor, Josip Frank, a Croatian Jewish lawyer and politician who converted to Catholicism and led numerous anti-Serbian incidents. Josip Frank carried on Starčević's ideology and defined Croat identity "strictly in terms of Serbophobia." Due to his staunch opposition to any cooperation between Croats and Serbs, Milovan Djilas described him as "a leading anti-Serbian demagogue and the instigator of the persecution of Serbs in Croatia." His followers, referred to as Frankovci, would go on to become the most ardent members of Ustaše. Under Frank's leadership, the Party of Rights became obsessively anti-Serb, and such sentiments dominated Croatian political life in the 1880s. British historian C. A. Macartney stated that due to the "gross intolerance" toward Serbs who lived in Slavonia, they had to seek protection from Count Károly Khuen-Héderváry, the Ban of Croatia-Slavonia, in 1883. During his reign from 1883 to 1903, Hungarian authorities intentionally exacerbated further division and hatred between Serbs and Croats to further their Magyarization policy. Carmichael writes that ethnic division between the Croats and the Serbs at the turn of the 20th century was stoked by a nationalist press and was "incubated entirely in the minds of extremists and fanatics, with little evidence that the areas in which Serbs and Croats had lived for many centuries in close proximity, such as Krajina, were more prone to ethnically inspired violence." In 1902 major anti-Serb riots in Croatia were caused by an article written by Serbian nationalist writer Nikola Stojanović (1880–1964) titled Do istrage vaše ili naše (Till the destruction of you or us) which denied the existence of a Croat nation and forecasted the result of an "inevitable" Serbian-Croatian conflict, that was reprinted in the Serb Independent Party's Srbobran magazine.

Between the mid-19th and early 20th century there were two factions in the Catholic Church in Croatia: the progressive faction which preferred uniting Croatia with Serbia in a progressive Slavic country, and the conservative faction that opposed this. The conservative faction became dominant by the end of the 19th century: The First Croatian Catholic Congress held in Zagreb in 1900 was unreservedly Serbophobic and anti-Orthodox.

=== World War I ===
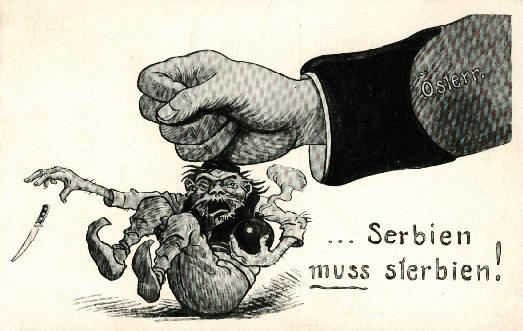
Serbien muss sterbien

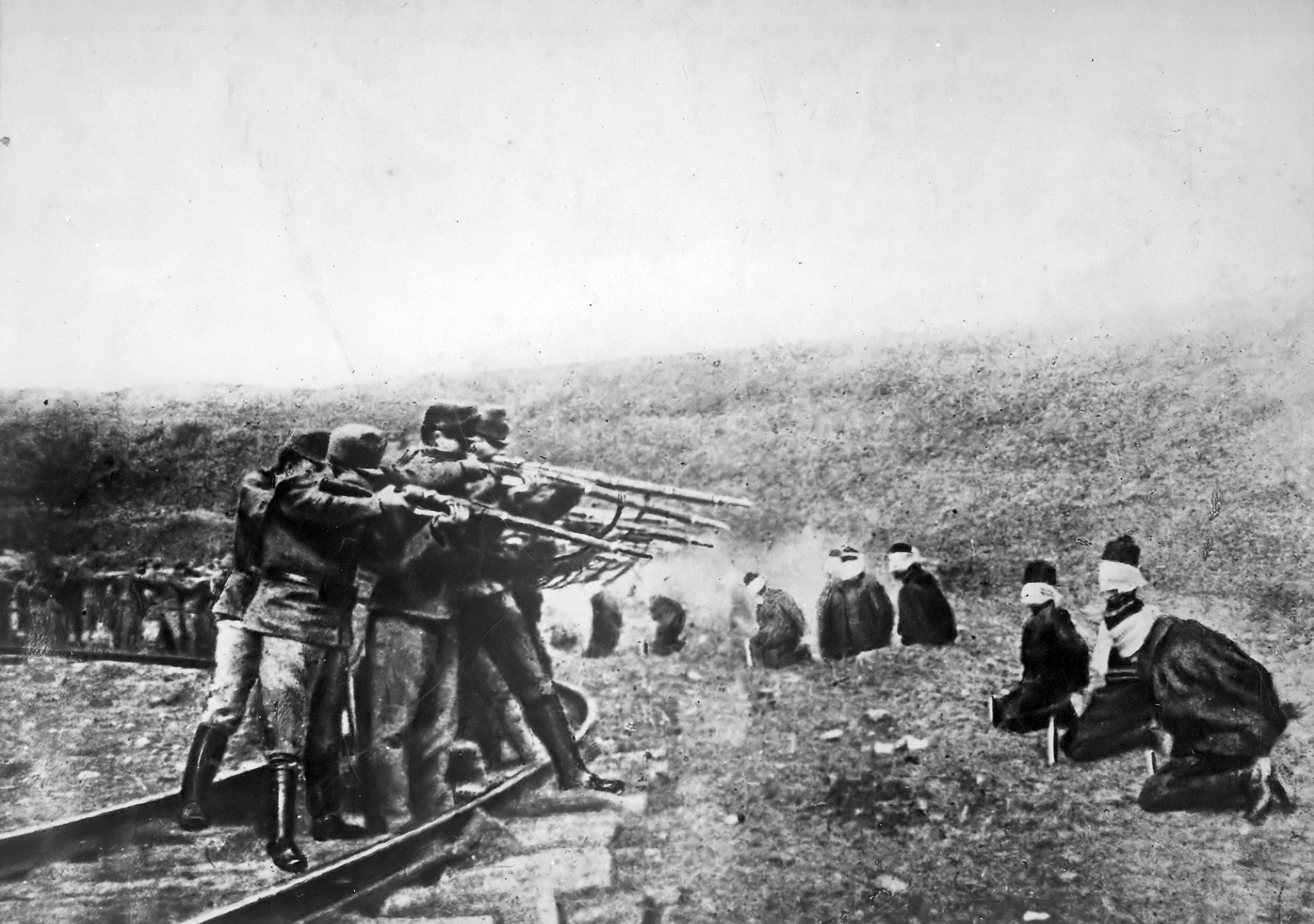
Austrians executing Serbian civilians (1917)

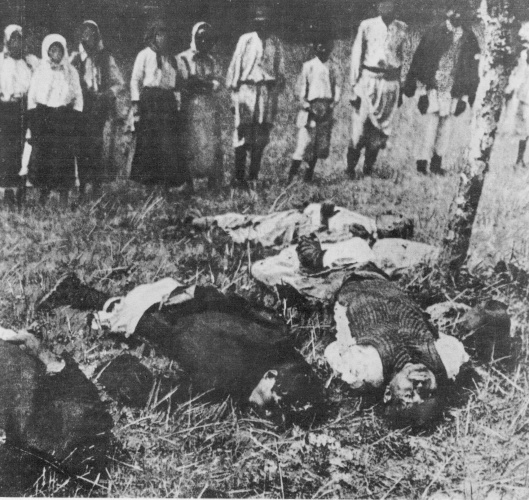
WWI Young Serbian civilians assassinated in the sight of their mothers by Austro-Hungarian soldiers

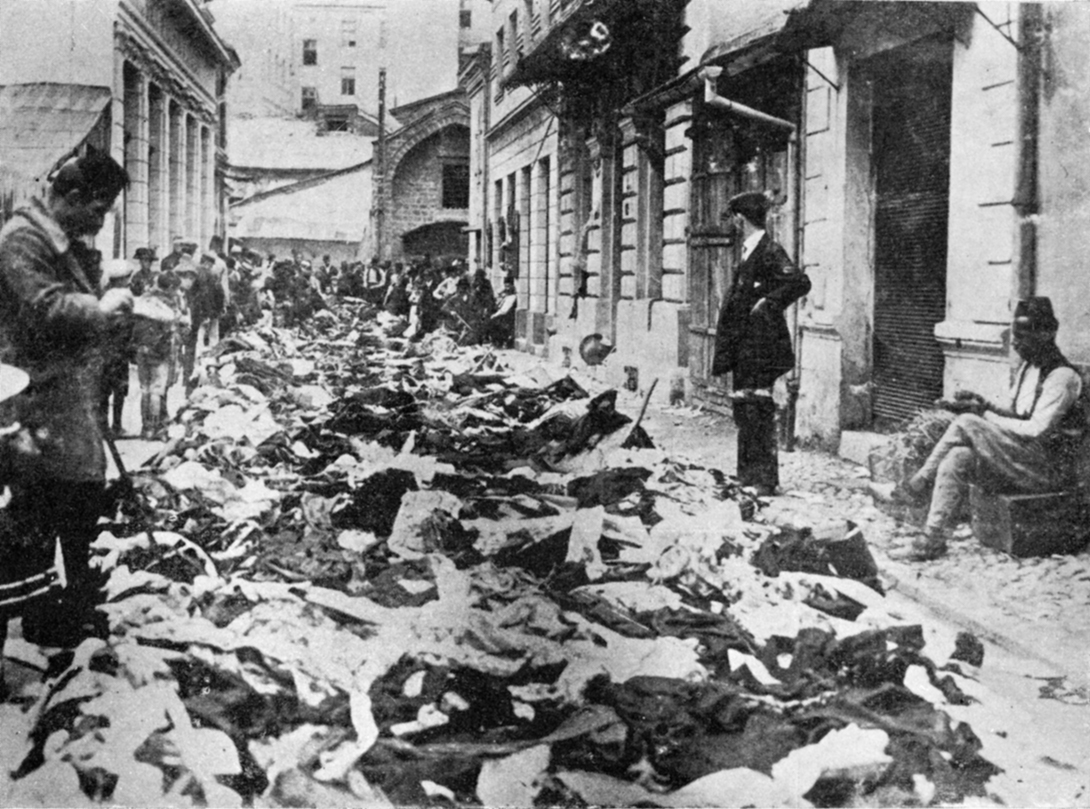
Devastated and robbed shops owned by Serbs in Sarajevo during the Anti-Serb pogrom in Sarajevo.

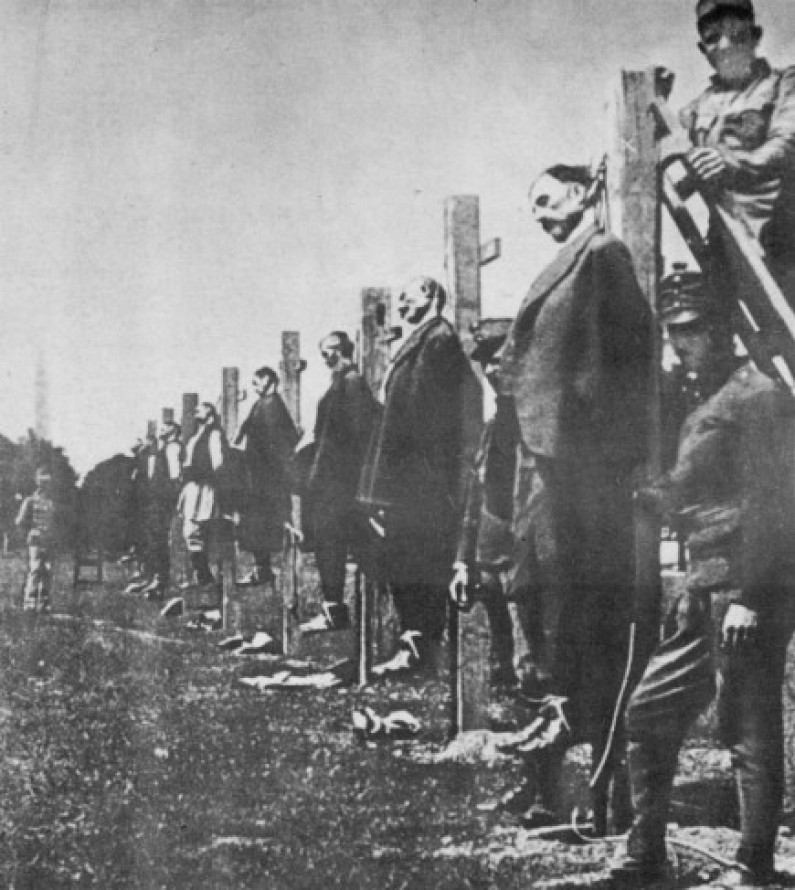
Austro-Hungarian soldiers executing Serb civilians during World War I.

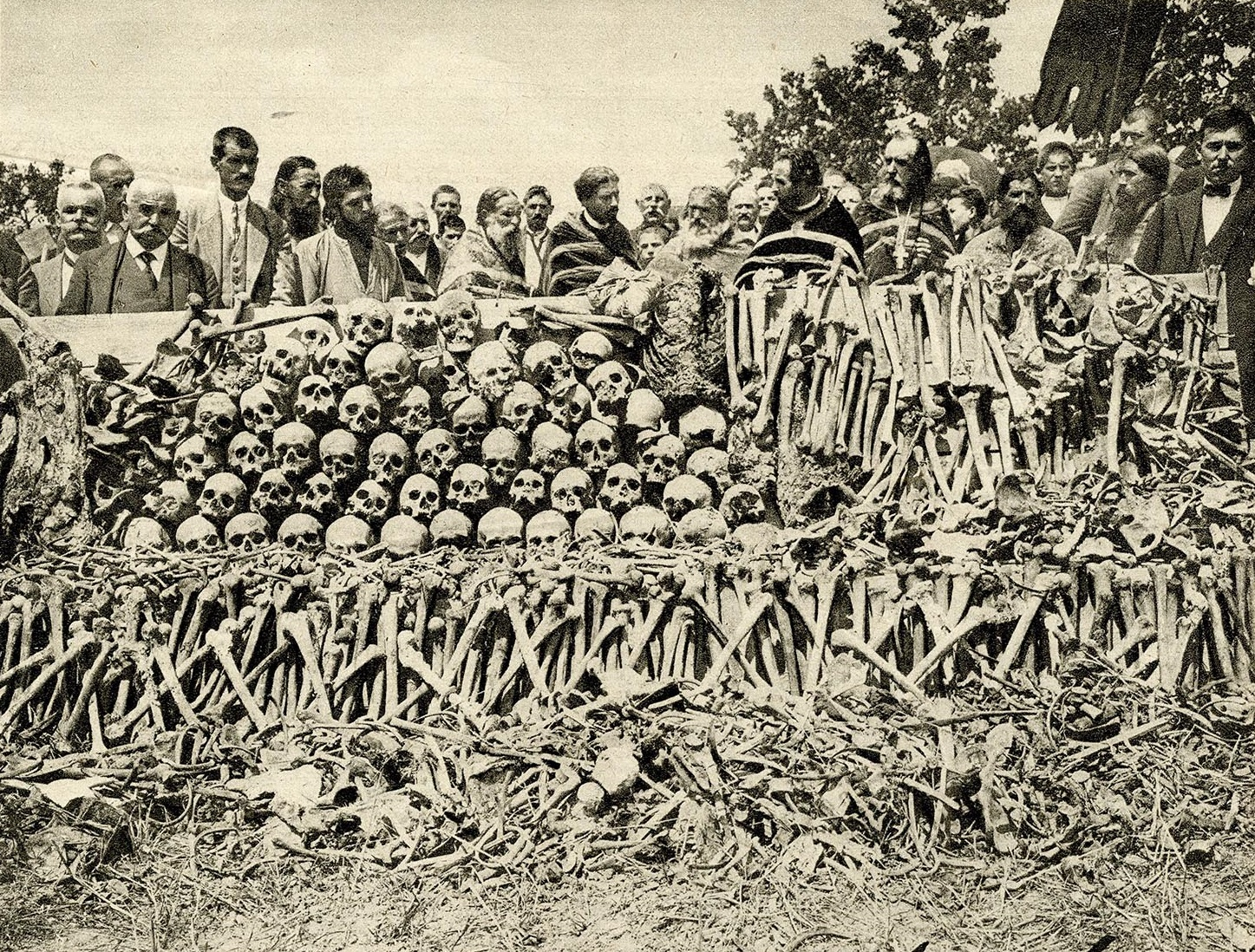
Bones of Serbs executed by Bulgarian soldiers in the Surdulica massacre during World War I. An estimated 2k–3k Serbian men were killed in the town during the first months of the Bulgarian occupation of southern Serbia.

After the Balkan Wars in 1912–1913, anti-Serb sentiment increased in the Austro-Hungarian administration of Bosnia and Herzegovina. Oskar Potiorek, governor of Bosnia and Herzegovina, closed many Serb societies and significantly contributed to the anti-Serb mood before the outbreak of World War I.

The assassination of Archduke Franz Ferdinand of Austria and Sophie, Duchess of Hohenberg in 1914 led to the Anti-Serb pogrom in Sarajevo. Ivo Andrić refers to this event as the "Sarajevo frenzy of hate." The crowds directed their anger principally at Serb shops, residences of prominent Serbs, the Serbian Orthodox Church, schools, banks, the Serb cultural society Prosvjeta, and the Srpska riječ newspaper offices. Two Serbs were killed that day. That night there were anti-Serb riots in other parts of the Austro-Hungarian Empire including Zagreb and Dubrovnik. In the aftermath of the Sarajevo assassination anti-Serb sentiment ran high throughout the Habsburg Empire. Austria-Hungary imprisoned and extradited around 5,500 prominent Serbs, sentenced 460 to death, and established the predominantly Muslim special militia Schutzkorps which carried on the persecution of Serbs.

The Sarajevo assassination became the casus belli for World War I. Taking advantage of an international wave of revulsion against this act of "Serbian nationalist terrorism," Austria-Hungary gave Serbia an ultimatum which led to World War I. Although the Serbs of Austria-Hungary were loyal citizens whose majority participated in its forces during the war, anti-Serb sentiment systematically spread and members of the ethnic group were persecuted all over the country. Austria-Hungary soon occupied the territory of the Kingdom of Serbia, including Kosovo, boosting already intense anti-Serbian sentiment among Albanians whose volunteer units were established to reduce the number of Serbs in Kosovo. A cultural example is the jingle "Alle Serben müssen sterben" ("All Serbs Must Die"), which was popular in Vienna in 1914. (It was also known as "Serbien muß sterbien").

Orders issued on 3 and 13 October 1914 banned the use of Serbian Cyrillic in the Kingdom of Croatia-Slavonia, limiting it to use in religious instruction. A decree was passed on 3 January 1915, that banned Serbian Cyrillic completely from public use. An imperial order on 25 October 1915, banned the use of Serbian Cyrillic in the Condominium of Bosnia and Herzegovina, except "within the scope of Serb Orthodox Church authorities."

=== Interwar period ===
==== Fascist Italy ====
In the 1920s, Italian fascists accused Serbs of having "atavistic impulses" and they claimed that the Yugoslavs were conspiring together on behalf of "Grand Orient masonry and its funds." One antisemitic claim was that Serbs were part of a "social-democratic, masonic Jewish internationalist plot." Benito Mussolini viewed not just the Serbs but the whole "Slavic race" as inferior and barbaric. He identified the Yugoslavs as a threat to Italy and he claimed that the threat rallied Italians together at the end of World War I: "The danger of seeing the Jugo-Slavians settle along the whole Adriatic shore had caused a bringing together in Rome of the cream of our unhappy regions. Students, professors, workmen, citizens—representative men—were entreating the ministers and the professional politicians."

==== Croats in the Kingdom of Yugoslavia ====
The relations between Croats and Serbs were stressed at the very beginning of the Yugoslav state. Opponents to the Yugoslav unification in the Croatian elite portrayed Serbs negatively, as hegemonists and exploiters, introducing Serbophobia into Croatian society. It was reported that in Lika, there was serious tension between Croats and Serbs. In post-war Osijek, the Šajkača hat was banned by the police but the Austro-Hungarian cap was freely worn, and in the school and judicial system the Orthodox Serbs were termed "Greek-Eastern." There was voluntary segregation in Knin.

A 1993 report of the Commission on Security and Cooperation in Europe stated that Belgrade's centralist policies for the Kingdom of Yugoslavia led to increased anti-Serbian sentiment in Croatia.

=== World War II ===
==== Nazi Germany ====
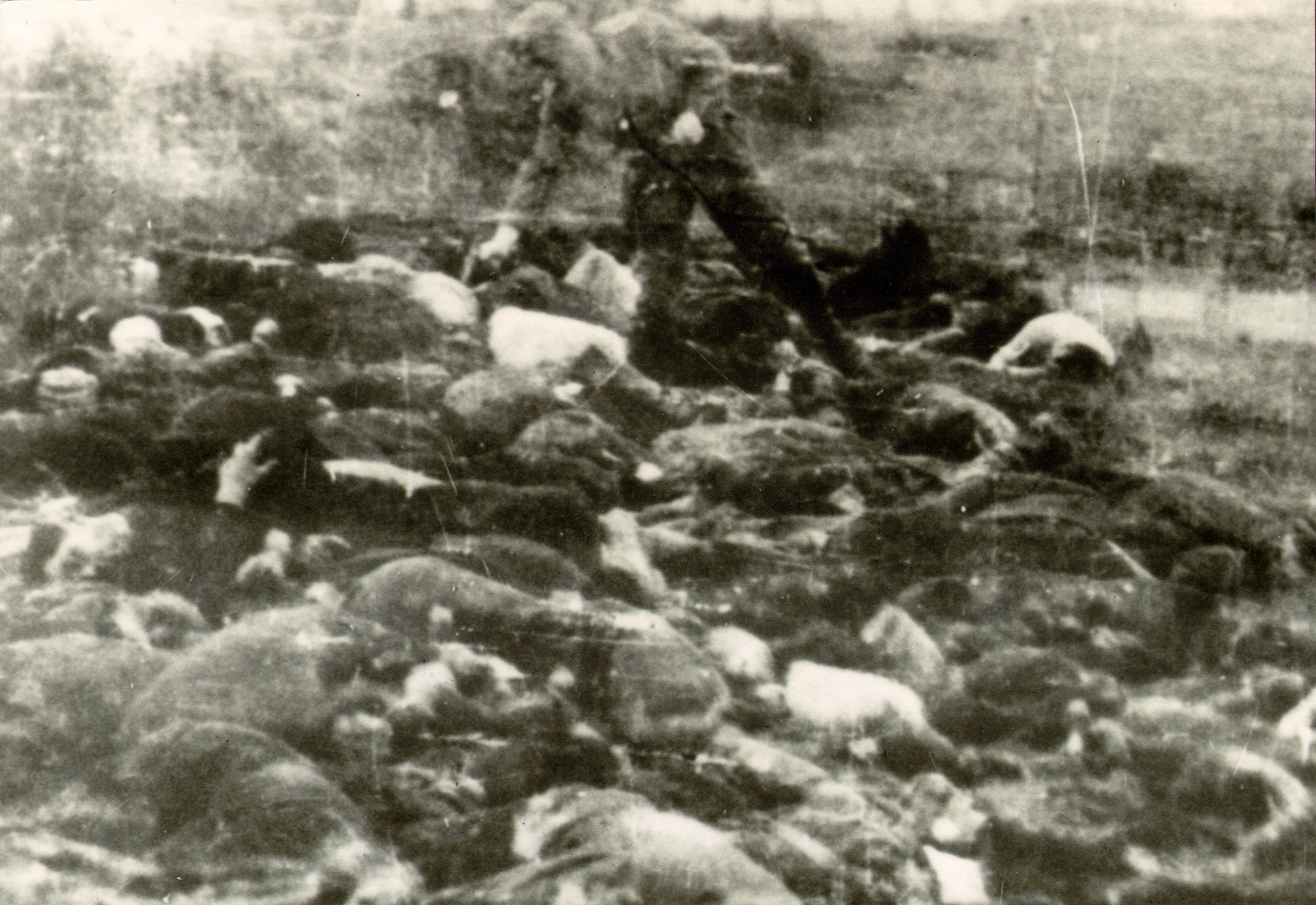
Nazi German mass execution of Serbian civilians in Kraljevo

Serbs, as well as other Slavs (mainly Poles and Russians), as well as non-Slavic peoples (such as Jews and Roma), were not considered Aryans by Nazi Germany. Instead, they were considered subhumans, inferior races (Untermenschen), and foreign races, and as a result, they were not considered part of the Aryan master race. Serbs, along with the Poles, were at the bottom of the Slavic "racial hierarchy" established by the Nazis. Anti-Serb sentiment increasingly infiltrated German Nazism after Adolf Hitler was appointed as Germany's chancellor in 1933. The roots of this sentiment can be found in his early life in Vienna, and when he was informed about the Yugoslav coup d'état that a group of pro-Western Serb officers conducted in March 1941, he decided to punish all Serbs as the main enemies of his new Nazi order. The propaganda ministry of Joseph Goebbels, with the support of the Bulgarian, Italian, and Hungarian press, was tasked with stimulating anti-Serb sentiment among the Croats, Slovenes, and Hungarians. The propaganda of the Axis powers accused the group of persecuting minorities and establishing concentration camps for ethnic Germans in order to justify an attack on Yugoslavia and Nazi Germany portrayed itself as a force which would save the Yugoslav people from the threat of Serb nationalism. In 1941, Yugoslavia was invaded and occupied by the military forces of the Axis powers (Nazi Germany, the Kingdom of Italy, and the Kingdom of Hungary).

==== Independent State of Croatia and Ustaše ====
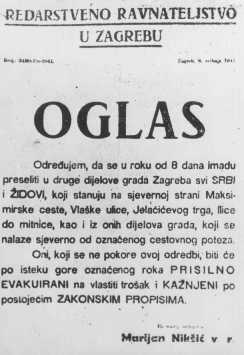
Order for Serbs and Jews to move out of their home in Zagreb, in the Nazi puppet state during World War II. Also, a warning of forcible expulsion for Serbs and Jews who fail to comply.

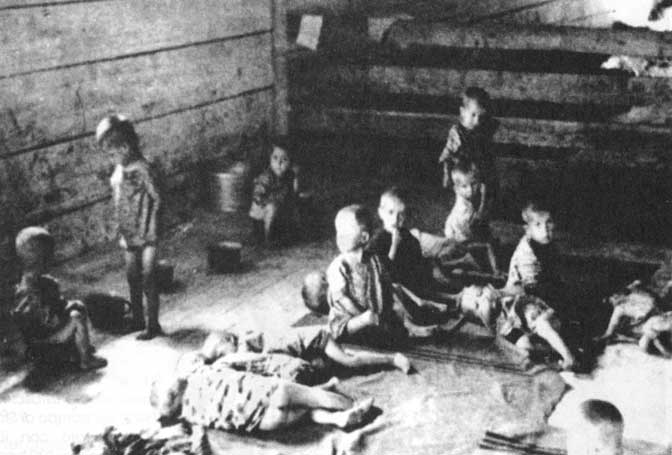
WWII Children in Concentration Camp in Croatia

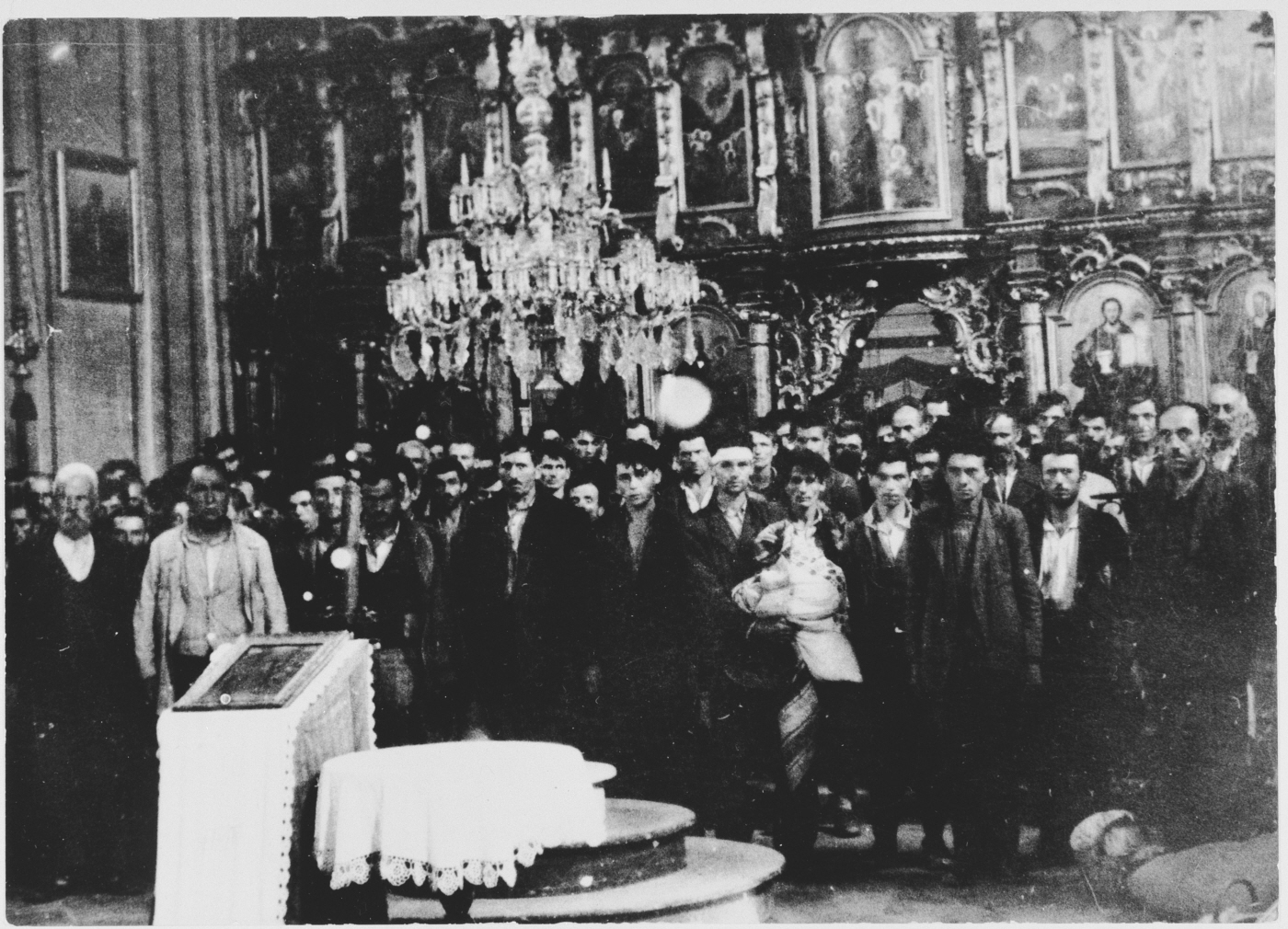
Forced mass Catholization of Serbs and execution in Glina Massacre

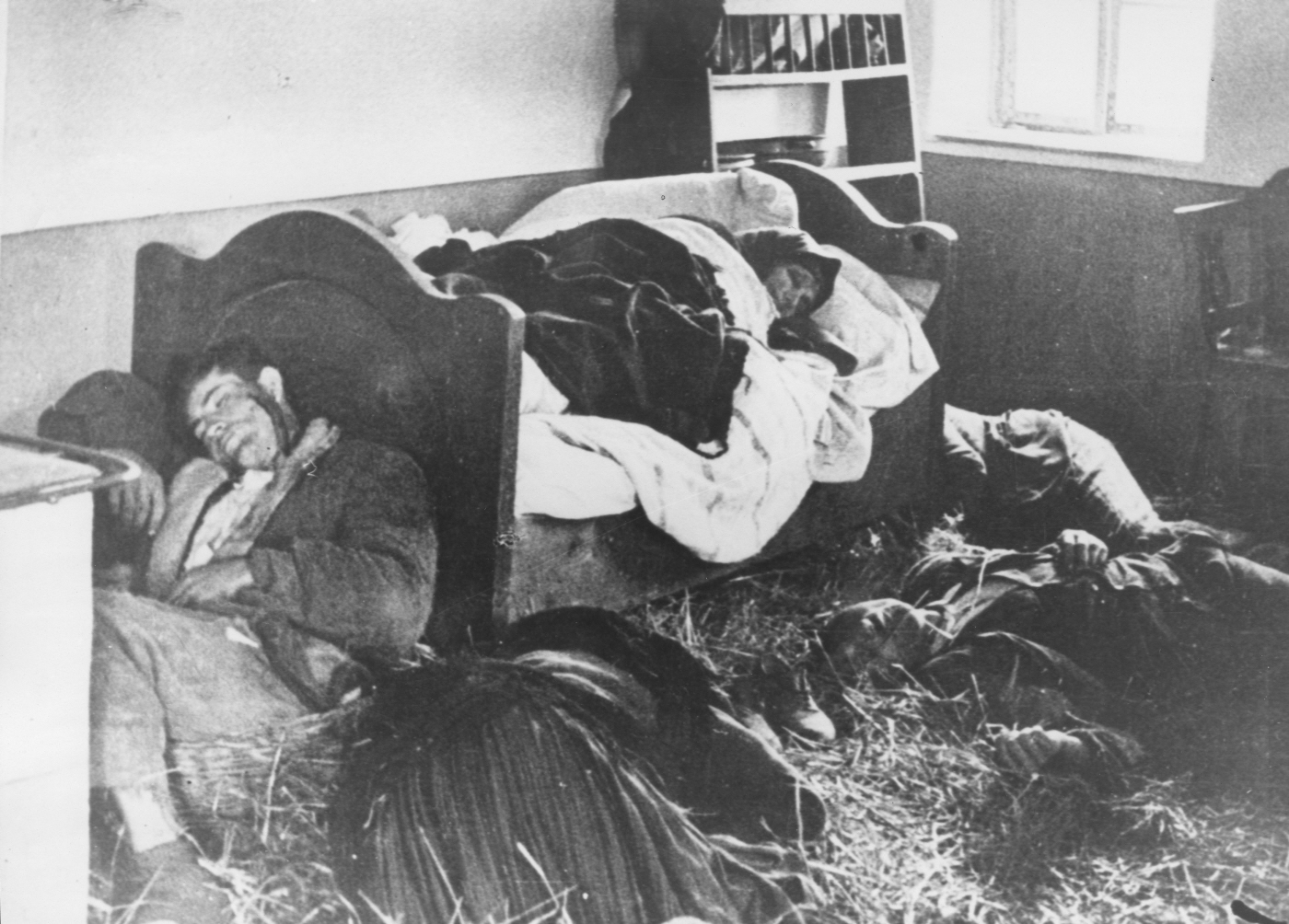
A Serb family slaughtered in their home in an Ustaša raid, 1941

The Axis occupation of Serbia enabled the Ustaše, a Croatian fascist and terrorist organization, to implement its extreme anti-Serbian ideology in the Independent State of Croatia (NDH). Its anti-Serb sentiment was racist and genocidal. The new government adopted racial laws, similar to those which existed in Nazi Germany, and it aimed them at Jews, Roma people, and Serbs, who were all defined as being "aliens outside the national community" and persecuted throughout the Independent State of Croatia (NDH) during World War II. It is estimated that between 320,000 and 340,000 Serbs were killed in the NDH by the Ustaše and their Axis allies.

Overall, the number of Serbs who were killed in Yugoslavia during World War II was about 700,000, the majority of whom were massacred by various fascist forces. Many historians and authors describe the Ustaše regime's mass killings of Serbs as meeting the definition of genocide, including Raphael Lemkin, who became recognized for coining the word genocide and initiating the Genocide Convention. The Sisak concentration camp was set up on 3 August 1942 by the Ustaše government following the Kozara Offensive, and it was specially formed for children.

Some priests in the Croatian Catholic Church actively participated in these Ustaša massacres and the mass conversion of Serbs to Catholicism. During the war, about 250,000 people of the Orthodox faith who were living within the territory of the NDH were either forced or coerced into converting to Catholicism by the Ustaša authorities. One of the reasons for the close cooperation of a part of the Catholic clergy was its anti-Serb position.

==== Kosovo ====
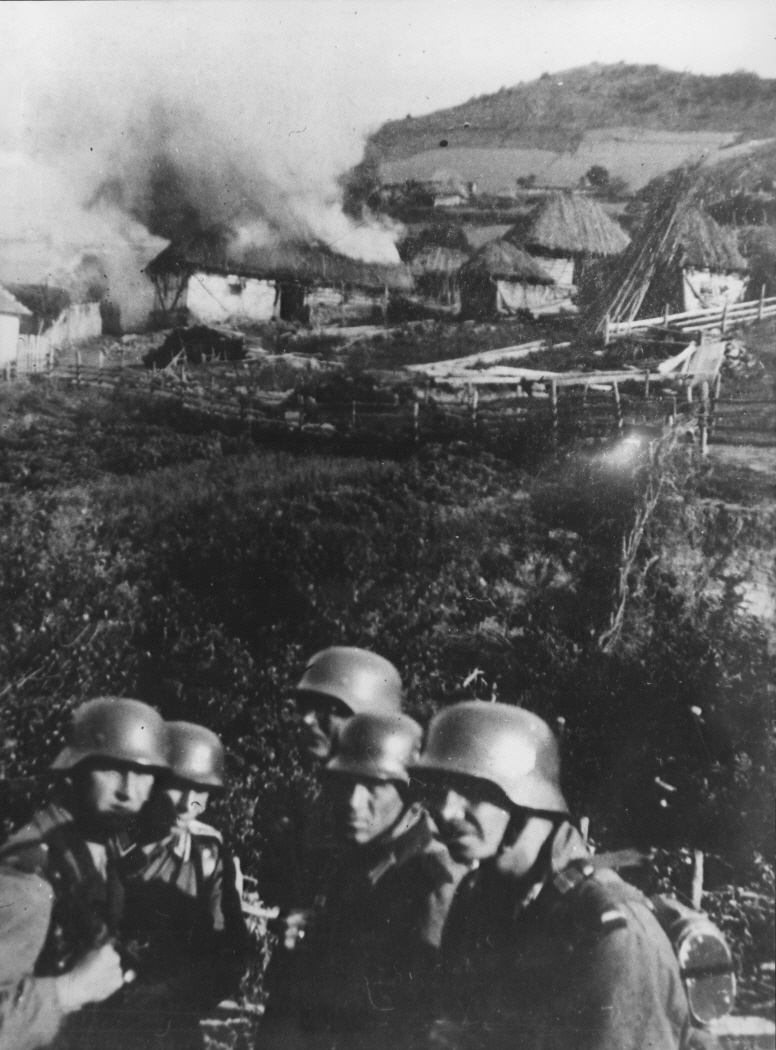
Nazi Germans bombs a Serbian village near Mitrovica, circa 1941

When Kosovo became part of Serbia after WWI, the Yugoslav authorities expelled 400,000 Albanians from Kosovo in the interwar period and promoted the settlement of mostly Serb colonists in the region. In WWII, western and central Kosovo became part of Albania, with Kosovo Albanians subsequently enacting brutal reprisals against the colonists. During the Italian occupation of Albania in WWII, between 70,000 and 100,000 Serbs were expelled and thousands massacred in annexed Kosovo by Albanian paramilitaries, mainly by the Vulnetari and Balli Kombëtar. Xhafer Deva recruited Kosovo Albanians to join the Waffen-SS. The 21st Waffen Mountain Division of the SS Skanderbeg (1st Albanian) was formed on 1 May 1944, composed of ethnic Albanians, named after Albanian national hero Skanderbeg, who fought the Ottomans in the 15th century. The division was better known for murdering, raping, and looting in predominantly Serbian areas than for participating in combat operations on behalf of the German war effort. Deva and his collaborators were anti-Slavic and advocated for an ethnically pure Greater Albania. By September 1944, with the Allied victory in the Balkans imminent, Deva and his men attempted to purchase weapons from withdrawing German soldiers in order to organize a "final solution" of the Slavic population of Kosovo. Nothing came of this as the powerful Yugoslav Partisans prevented any large-scale ethnic cleansing of Slavs from occurring. However, these conflicts were relatively low-level compared with other areas of Yugoslavia during the war years.

=== After World War II ===
Nearly four decades later, in the 1986 draft of the Memorandum of the Serbian Academy of Sciences and Arts, concern was expressed that Serbophobia, together with other things, could provoke the restoration of Serbian nationalism with dangerous consequences. The 1987 Yugoslav economic crisis, and different opinions within Serbia and other republics about what were the best ways to resolve it, exacerbated growing anti-Serbian sentiment among non-Serbs, but also enhanced Serbian support for Serbian nationalism.

=== Breakup of Yugoslavia ===
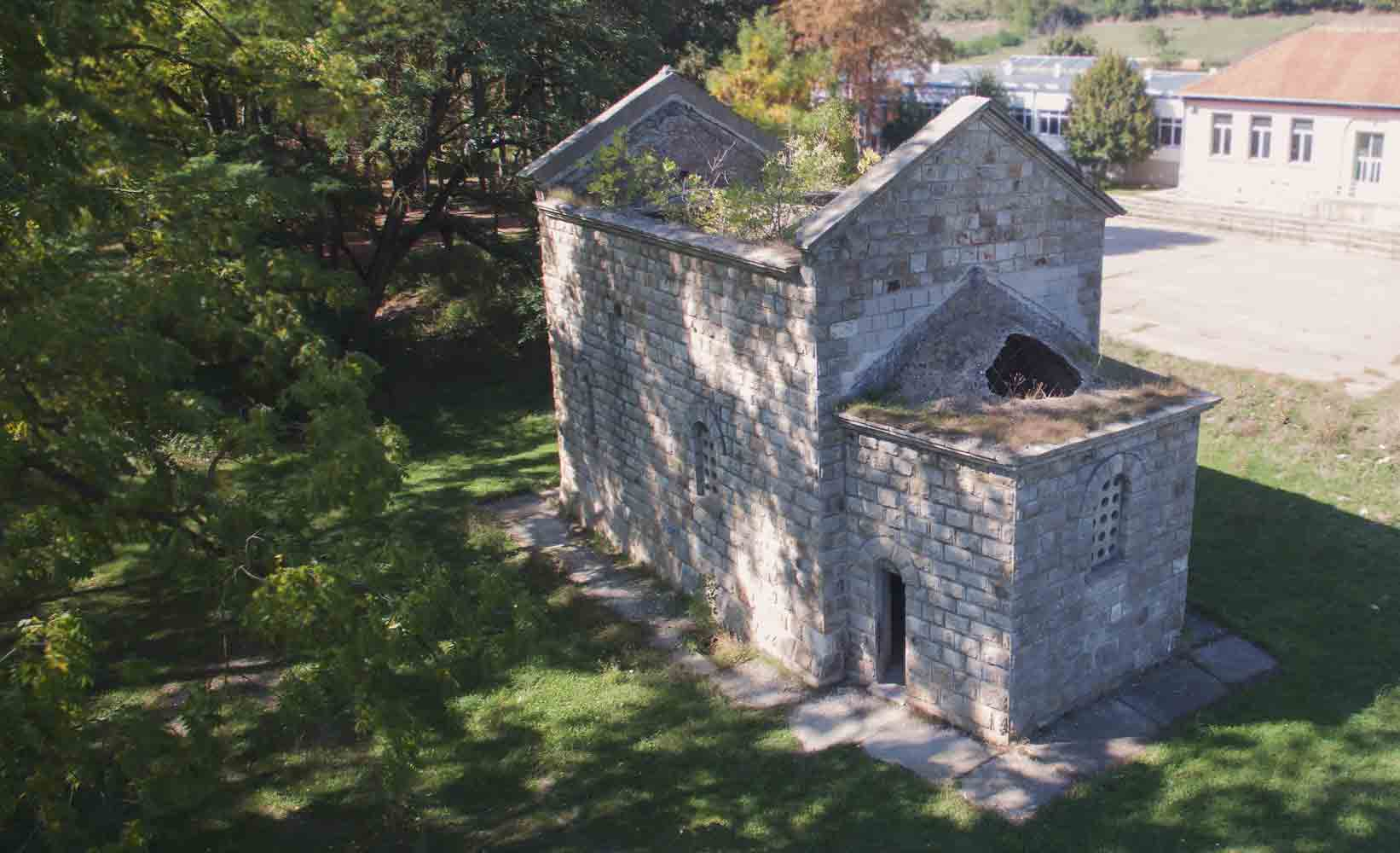
The ruins of the medieval Serbian Orthodox Church of St John the Baptist in Kosovo

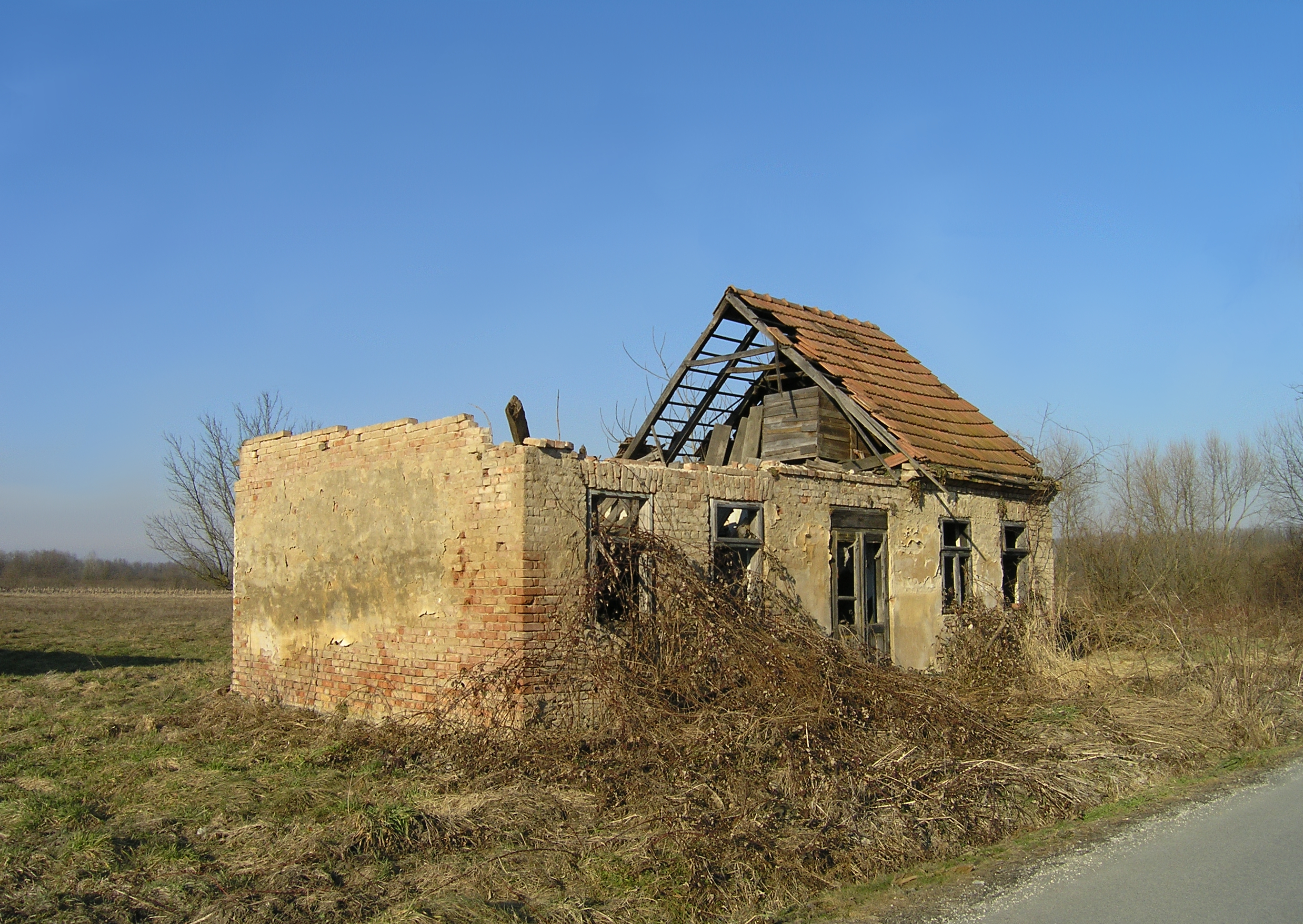
Remnants of a formerly Serb-inhabited house in Croatia

During the Yugoslav Wars of the 1990s, anti-Serb sentiment became widespread across Slovenia, Croatia, Bosnia and Herzegovina, and Kosovo, and because of its independence and its historical association with Serbophobia, the Independent State of Croatia would sometimes serve as a rallying symbol for people who intended to proclaim aversion towards Serbia. It also worked vice versa. And while the Serbian nationalism of the time is well-known, anti-Serb sentiment was present in all non-Serb republics of Yugoslavia during its breakup. It is estimated that in the 90s, up to 2.8 million books were written off from Croatian public libraries, with most of them being destroyed under the guise of the regular process of writing off lost and damaged books from the library systems; the targeted books were frequently Serbian or printed in Cyrillic, along with books ideologically associated with the dissolved Yugoslavian state.

In 1997, the FR Yugoslavia submitted claims to the International Court of Justice in which it charged that Bosnia and Herzegovina was responsible for the acts of genocide which were committed against the Serbs of Bosnia and Herzegovina, acts which were incited by anti-Serb sentiment and rhetoric which was communicated through all forms of the media. For example, The Novi Vox, a Muslim youth paper, published a poem titled "Patriotic Song" with the following verses: "Dear mother, I'm going to plant willows; We'll hang Serbs from them; Dear mother, I'm going to sharpen knives; We'll soon fill pits again." The paper Zmaj od Bosne published an article with a sentence saying "Each Muslim must name a Serb and take an oath to kill him." The radio station Hajat regularly broadcast "public calls for the execution of Serbs."

According to Vojislav Koštunica and British commentator Mary Dejevky, in the summer of 1995, the French president, Jacques Chirac, created controversy when he commented on the Bosnian War, he reportedly called Serbs "a nation of robbers and terrorists."

During the war in Croatia, French writer Alain Finkielkraut insinuated that Serbs were inherently evil, comparing Serb actions to the Nazis during World War II.

During the NATO bombing of Yugoslavia, columnist Thomas Friedman wrote the following in The New York Times on 23 April 1999: "Like it or not, we are at war with the Serbian nation (the Serbs certainly think so), and the stakes have to be very clear: Every week you ravage Kosovo is another decade we will set your country back by pulverizing you. You want 1950? We can do 1950. You want 1389? [referring to the Battle of Kosovo] We can do 1389 too." Friedman urged the US to destroy "in Belgrade: every power grid, water pipe, bridge [and] road", annex Albania and Macedonia as "U.S. protectorates", "occupy the Balkans for years," and "[g]ive war a chance." Fairness and Accuracy in Reporting (FAIR) labeled Friedman's remarks "war-mongering" and "crude race-hatred and war-crime agitation."

Danon Cadik, Chief Rabbi of Yugoslavia, condemned what he stated to be the "unrestrained anti-Serbian propaganda, raging during all this war, following the Nazi model, but much more efficient means and in a much more sophisticated and more expensive way."

Outside the Balkans, Noam Chomsky observed that not just the government of Serbia, but also the people, were reviled and threatened. He described the jingoism as "a phenomenon I have not seen in my lifetime since the hysteria whipped up about 'the Japs' during World War II." Chomsky made such comments while also denying some aspects of the Bosnian genocide.

==== Criticism ====
Some criticism of Anti-Serb sentiment or Serbophobia purportedly corresponds to its interplay with perceived historical revisionism and myths practiced by some Serbian nationalist writers and the government of Slobodan Milošević in the 1990s. According to political scientist David Bruce MacDonald, in the 1980s Serbs increasingly began to compare themselves to Jews as fellow victims in world history, which involved tragedizing historic events, from the 1389 Battle of Kosovo to the 1974 Yugoslav Constitution, as every aspect of history was seen as yet another example of persecution and victimisation of Serbs at the hands of external negative forces. Serbophobia was often likened to antisemitism and expressed itself as a re-analysis of history where every event that had a negative effect on the Serbs was likened to a tragedy, and used to justify territorial expansion into neighbouring regions. According to Christopher Bennett, former director of the International Crisis Group in the Balkans, the idea of historic Serb martyrdom grew out of the thinking and writing of Dobrica Ćosić who developed a complex and paradoxical theory of Serb national persecution, which evolved over two decades between the late 1960s and the late 1980s into the Greater Serbian programme. Additionally, Serbian nationalist politicians have made associations to Serbian "martyrdom" in history (from the Battle of Kosovo in 1389 to the genocide during World War II) to justify Serbian politics of the 1980s and 1990s. In late 1988, months before the Revolutions of 1989, Milošević accused his critics, like the Slovenian political leader Milan Kučan, of "spreading fear of Serbia" as a political tactic.

== Contemporary and recent issues ==
At a football game between Kosovo and Croatia played in Albania in October 2016, the fans together chanted murderous slogans against Serbs. Both countries face FIFA hearings due to the incident. Croatian and Ukrainian sports fans have put up hate messages towards Serbs and Russians during a match of their national teams in the 2018 FIFA World Cup qualifier.

=== Kosovo Albanians ===
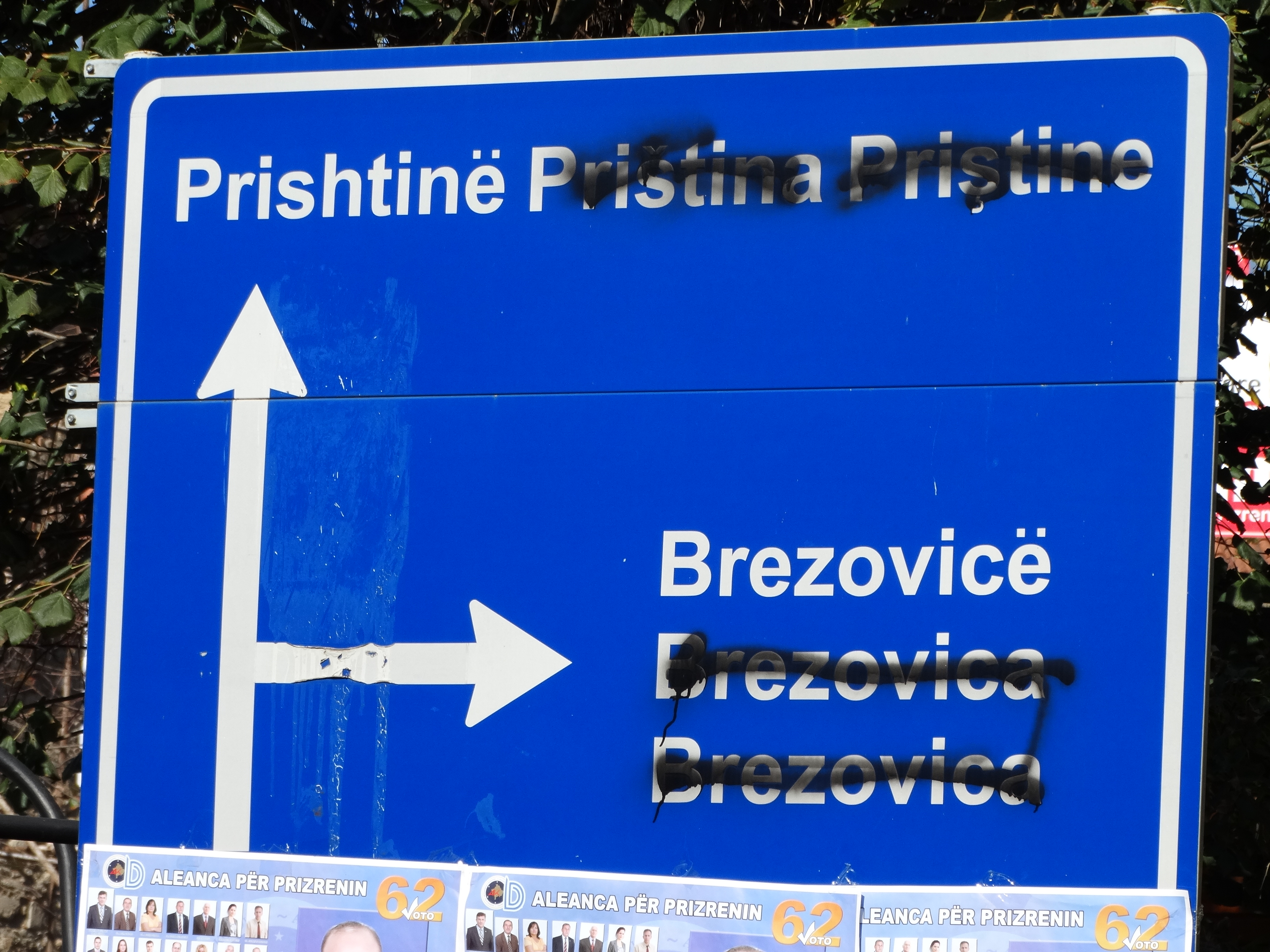
Road signs that depict Serbian names of locations across Kosovo are commonly vandalised.

The worst ethnic violence in Kosovo since the end of the 1999 conflict erupted in the partitioned town of Mitrovica, leaving hundreds wounded and at least 14 people dead. United Nations peacekeepers and NATO troops scrambled to contain a raging gun battle between Serbs and ethnic Albanians. Within hours the province was immersed in anti-Serb and anti-UN rioting and had regressed to levels of violence not seen since 1999. In Serbia the events were also called the March Pogrom (Serbian: Мартовски погром / Martovski pogrom). International courts in Pristina have prosecuted several people who attacked several Serbian Orthodox churches, handing down jail sentences ranging from 21 months to 16 years. Numerous Serbian cultural sites in Kosovo were destroyed during and after the Kosovo War. According to the International Center for Transitional Justice, 155 Serbian Orthodox churches and monasteries were destroyed by Kosovo Albanians between June 1999 and March 2004.

Kosovo Albanian media depict Serbia and Serbs as a threat to state frame and security, as disrupting institutional order, draining resources, being extremists, tied to criminal activities (in North Kosovo), and in retrospect as perpetrators of war crimes and violations of humans rights (reminding the public of Serbs as enemies). Serbs are blamed for inducing the Kosovo War, and since the war are negatively characterized as uncooperative, aggressive, extremist while the Serbian crimes in the war are termed "genocide."

=== Croatia ===
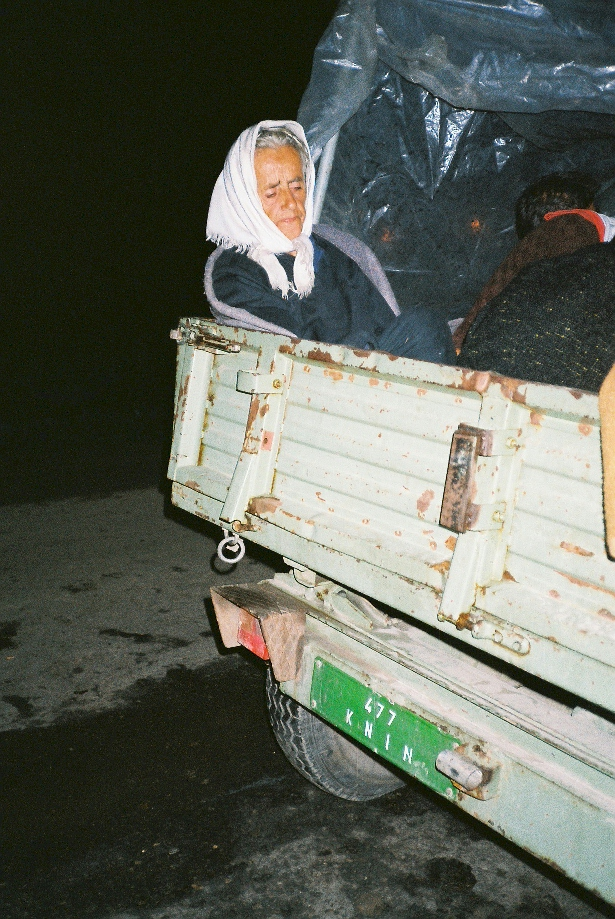
An elderly Serb refugee in a railer during Operation Storm.

Croatian nationalist propaganda, especially the Catholic Church supported groups, often advocates anti-Serb views. In 2015 Amnesty International reported that Croatian Serbs continued to face discrimination in public sector employment and the restitution of tenancy rights to social housing vacated during the war. In 2017 they again pointed Serbs faced significant barriers to employment and obstacles to regain their property. Amnesty International also said that right to use minority languages and scripts continued to be politicized and unimplemented in some towns and that heightened nationalist rhetoric and hate speech contributed to growing ethnic intolerance and insecurity. According to the 2018 European Commission against Racism and Intolerance report, racist and intolerant hate speech in public discourse is escalating; and one of the main targets are Serbs.

Croatian usage of the Ustaše salute Za dom spremni, the equivalent of Nazi salute Sieg Heil, is not banned. It is deemed unconstitutional but allowed in "exceptional situations." In 2016, this salute was inscribed on a plaque that was installed near the site of Jasenovac, sparking a reaction from the Serb and Jewish community. It has also been chanted during football matches. Some Croats, including politicians, have attempted to deny and to minimise the magnitude of the genocide perpetrated against Serbs in the Independent State of Croatia. From 2016 to 2019, anti-fascist groups, leaders of Croatia's Serb, Roma, and Jewish communities and former top Croat officials boycotted the official state commemoration for the victims of the Jasenovac concentration camp because, as they said, Croatian authorities refused to denounce the Ustaša legacy explicitly and tolerated the downplaying and revitalization of their crimes, which included the equation of these crimes with the communist crimes from 1945.

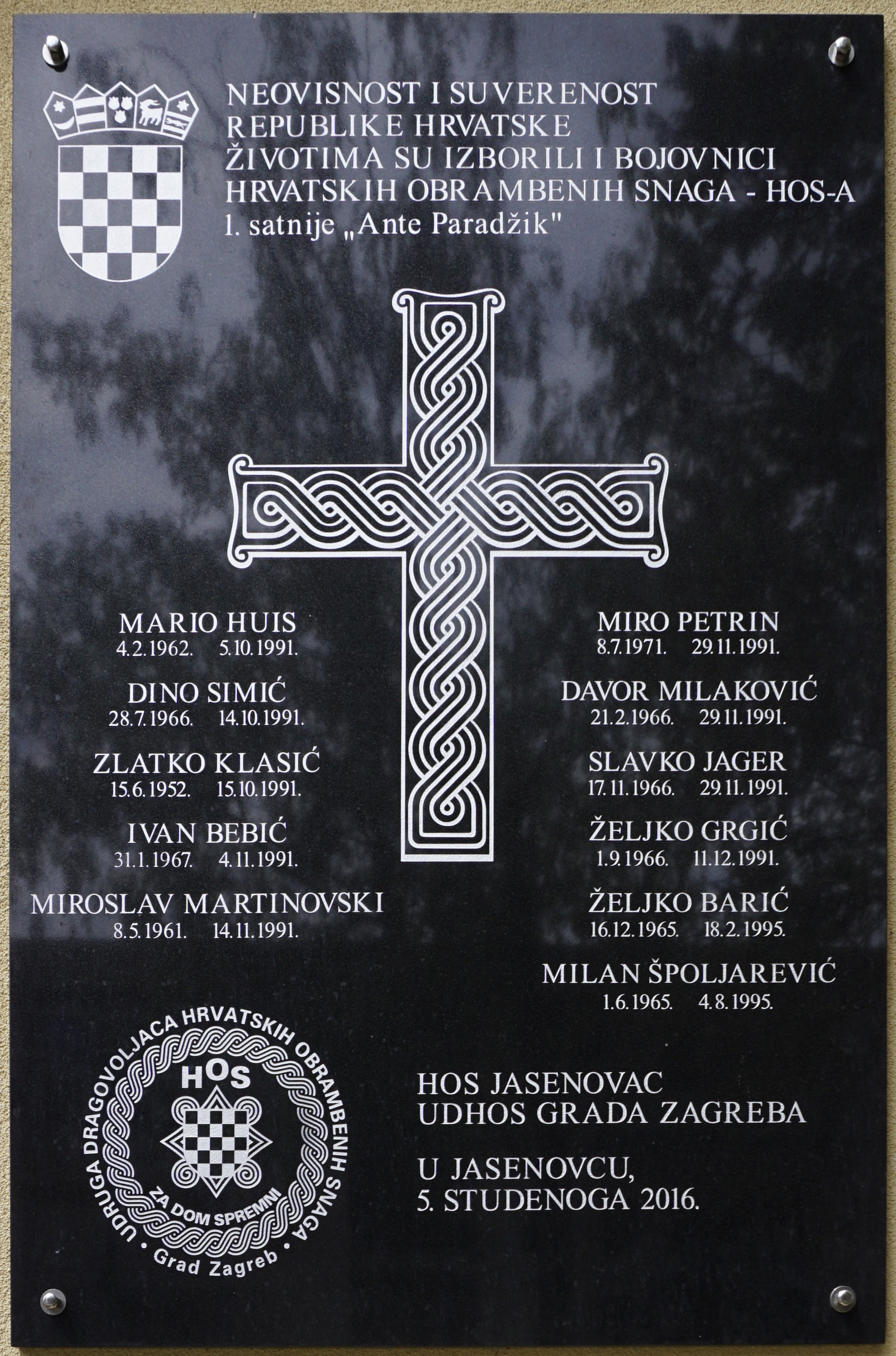
Controversial memorial plaque in Jasenovac with Croatian Ustaše salute Za dom spremni

In 2013, it was reported that a group of right-wing extremists had taken over the Croatian Wikipedia, editing mostly articles related to the Ustaše, whitewashing their crimes, and articles targeting Serbs. In the same year there were protests in Vukovar against introducing Serbian language and Cyrillic script signs, because according to one organizer there had to be a "sign of respect for the sacrifice Vukovar has made." Later signs with Cyrillic on administrative buildings were destroyed by Croatian veterans. In 2019, Ivan Penava, Mayor of Vukovar, presented the conclusion that conditions have not been met to introduce special rights on the equal use of the Serbian minority's language and script in Vukovar.

Serbian politicians have recently accused Croatian politicians of anti-Serbian sentiment. In its 2016 report on human rights in Croatia, the United States Department of State warned about pro-Ustaše and anti-Serb sentiment in Croatia. According to the Serbian National Council, hate speech, threats and violence against Serbs rose by 57% in 2016. On 12 February 2018, when Serbian president Vučić was to meet with Croatian government representatives in Zagreb, hundreds of demonstrators chanted the salute Za dom spremni! at the city square.

Marko Perković and band Thompson created controversy by performing songs that openly glorifies the Ustaša regime and the Genocide of Serbs. The band performed Jasenovac i Gradiška Stara, which celebrate the massacres at the Jasenovac and Stara Gradiška, which were among the largest extermination camps in Europe.

In 2019, there were several alleged hate-motivated incidents targeting Serbs in Croatia, including an attack on three VK Crvena zvezda players in the coastal city of Split, an attack on four seasonal workers in the town of Supetar, two of whom were Serbs, singled out by the attackers due to the dialect they were using, and an attack on Serbs who were watching a Red Star Belgrade match. The latter which resulted in injuries to five people, including a minor, resulted in the indictment of 15 men for committing a hate crime.

During the November 2025 Days of Serbian Culture, a children's folk performance in the city of Split was disrupted by around fifty masked men who shouted "Za dom spremni" and made the participants leave. The disruption was condemned by Croatian officials, including the Croatian president Zoran Milanović and prime minister Andrej Plenković. A few days after, several dozen masked hooligans attempted to prevent an exhibition dedicated to legacy of Dejan Medaković at the Serb Cultural Center in Zagreb, singing pro-Ustaše songs, performing roman salutes and harassing journalists. In Rijeka, a group of right-wing protesters gathered outside Centar Zamet during the Balkan Karate Championship, where the Serbian national team was participating.

=== Montenegro under Milo Đukanović ===
Some observers have described Milo Đukanović, the longtime ruler of Montenegro, as a Serbophobe. Serbs of Montenegro have supposedly been pressured to declare themselves Montenegrins, following the 2006 referendum. The acquisition of Montenegro's independence has renewed the dispute over the ethnic and linguistic identity. Although the majority of citizens in Montenegro declare themselves to speak Serbian language, it is not recognized as an official language. A number of Serbian writers have recently been removed from the school curriculum in Montenegro, which was described as creation of an "anti-Serb atmosphere" by a Serbian MP.

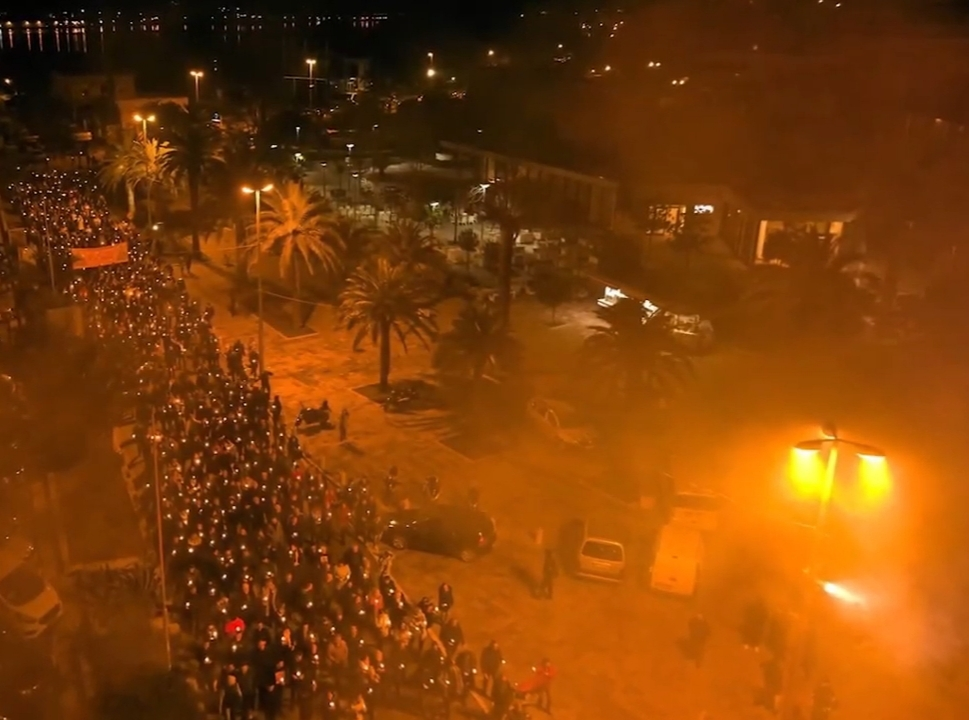
Protests in Kotor (2020) against religious discrimination and the controversial law on religious freedoms

According to the 2017 survey conducted by the Council of Europe in cooperation with the Office of the state ombudsman, 45% of respondents reported experiences of religious discrimination and perception of discrimination were highest by a significant margin among Serbian Orthodox Church members, while Serbs were facing discrimination considerably more than other ethnic communities. In June 2019, Mirna Nikčević, first adviser to the Embassy of Montenegro in Turkey, commented on protests in front of the Cathedral of the Resurrection of Christ in Podgorica against the announced controversial religious law: "Honestly, I would burn the temple and all the cattle there." A few days later, Zoran Vujović, an actor of the Montenegrin National Theatre, has posted a lot of insults against the Serbs on his Facebook profile, saying that they were "nothingness, ignorant, degenerate, and poisonous." According to some reporters, pro-Serbian media have faced discrimination.

As of late December 2019, the newly proclaimed religion law or officially Law on Freedom of Religion or Belief and the Legal Status of Religious Communities, which de jure transfers the ownership of church buildings and estates from the Serbian Orthodox Church to the Montenegrin state, sparked a series of peaceful nationwide protests which continued to February 2020. The Freedom House described the adoption of the law, which is widely seen to target the Serbian Orthodox Church, as "questionable decision." Eighteen opposition MPs, mostly Serbs, were arrested prior to the voting, under the charge for violently disrupting the vote. Some church officials were attacked by the police and a number of journalists, opposition activists and protesting citizens were arrested. President Milo Đukanović called the protesting citizens "a lunatic movement."

=== Hate speech and derogatory terms ===
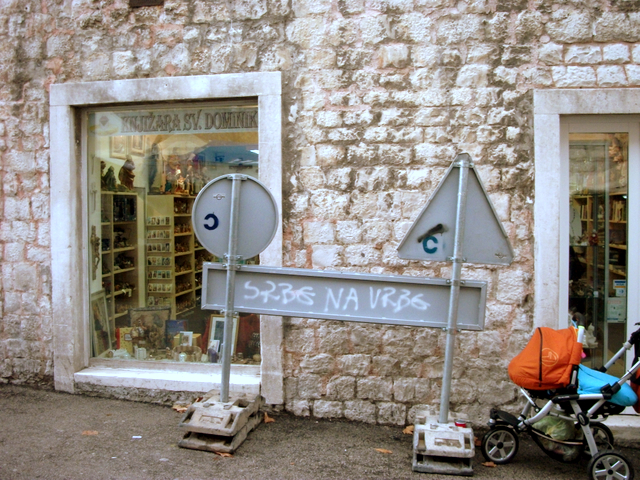
Graffiti calling for murder of Serbs, in front of the Archbishopric bookshop in Split, Croatia.

Among derogatory terms for Serbs are "Vlachs" (Власи / Vlasi) which was used mainly in Hrvatsko Zagorje during rebellion in the early 20th century. and "Chetniks" (четници / četnici) used by Croats and Bosniaks; Shkije by Albanians; while Čefurji is used in Slovenia for immigrants from other former Yugoslav republics. In Montenegro, a widely used derogatory term for Serbs is Posrbice (посрбице), and it denotes "Montenegrins who identify as Serbs."

==== Anti-Serb slogans ====
The slogan Srbe na vrbe! (Србе на врбе), meaning "Hang Serbs from the willow trees!" (lit. 'Serbs onto willows!') originates from a poem, and was first used by the Slovene politician Marko Natlačen in 1914, at the beginning of the Austro-Hungarian war against Serbia. It was popularized before World War II by Mile Budak, the chief architect of Ustaše ideology against Serbs. During World War II there were mass hangings of Serbs in the Independent State of Croatia as part of the Ustaše persecution of the Serbs.

In present-day Croatian nationalists and people who oppose the return of Serb refugees often use the slogan. Graffiti with the phrase is common, and was noted in the press when it was found painted on a church in 2004, 2006, and on another church in 2008. In 2010, a banner displaying the slogan appeared in the midst of tourist season at the entrance to Split, a major tourist hub in Croatia, during a Davis Cup tennis match between the two countries. It was removed by the police within hours, and the banner's creator was later apprehended and charged. In 2016, a Serbian Orthodox church in Geelong, Australia, was spray-painted with the slogan, along with other neo-Nazi symbols.

== Gallery ==
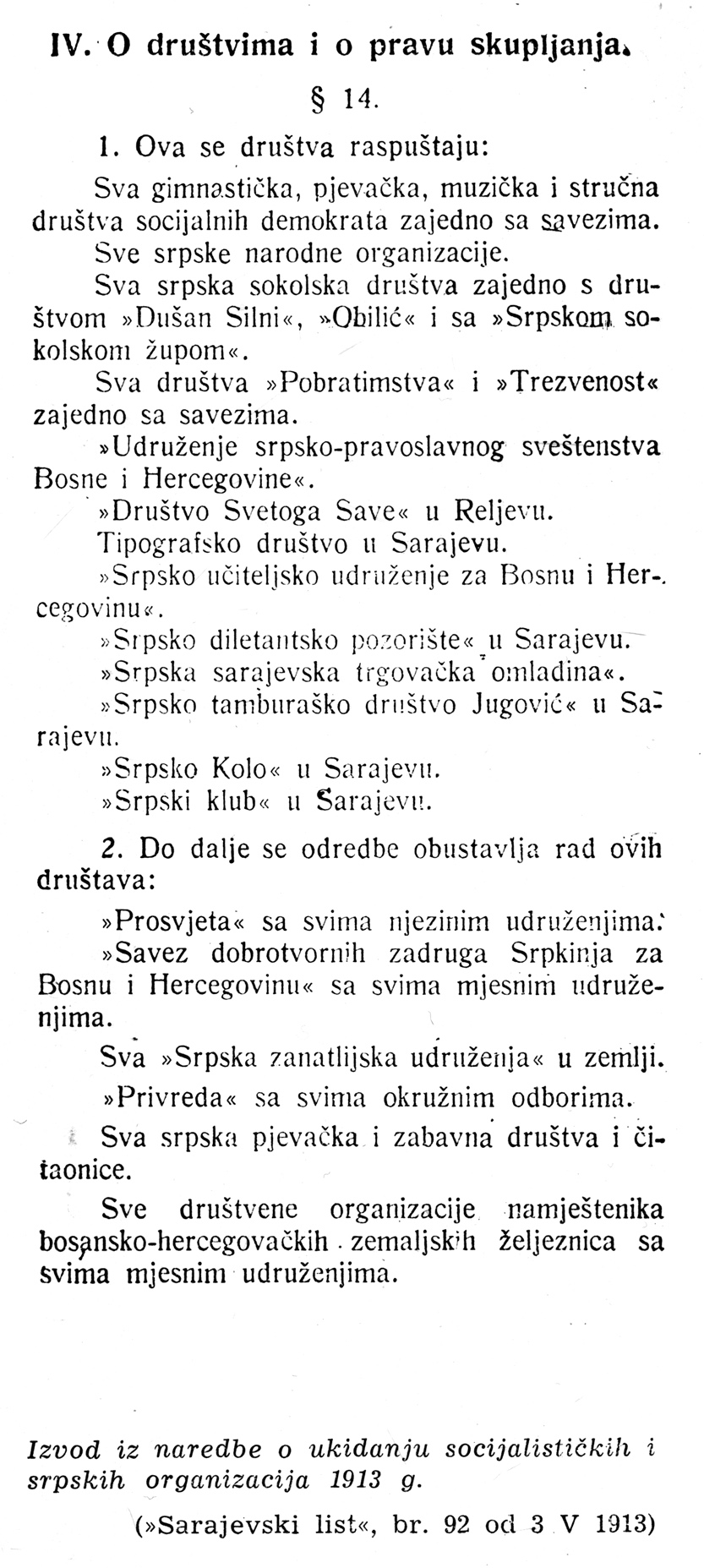
Excerpt from a 1913 Austro-Hungarian order, that banned numerous social-democratic and ethnic Serb cultural societies in Bosnia-Herzegovina.

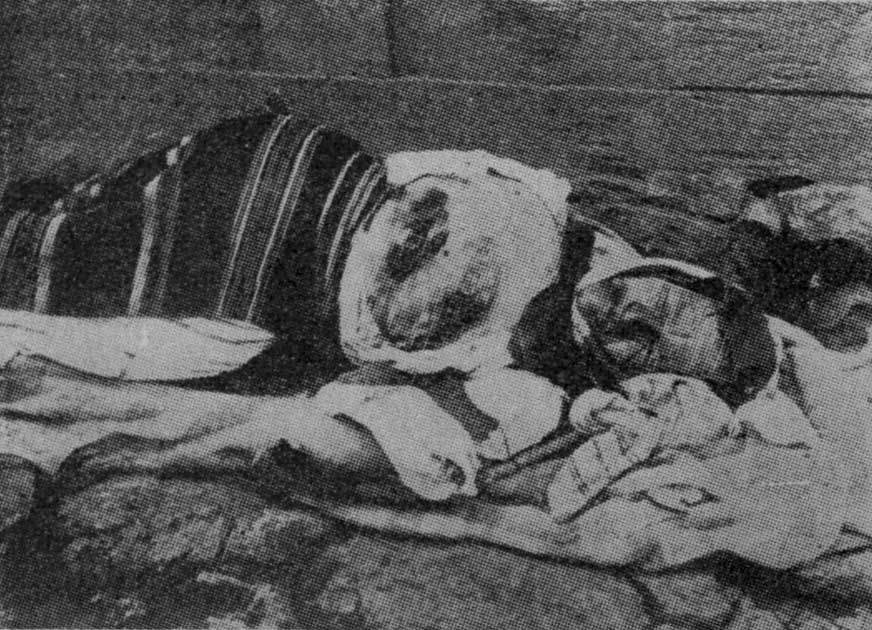
WWI Elder Serbian Peasant Woman Civilian, mutilated by Germans and Austrians

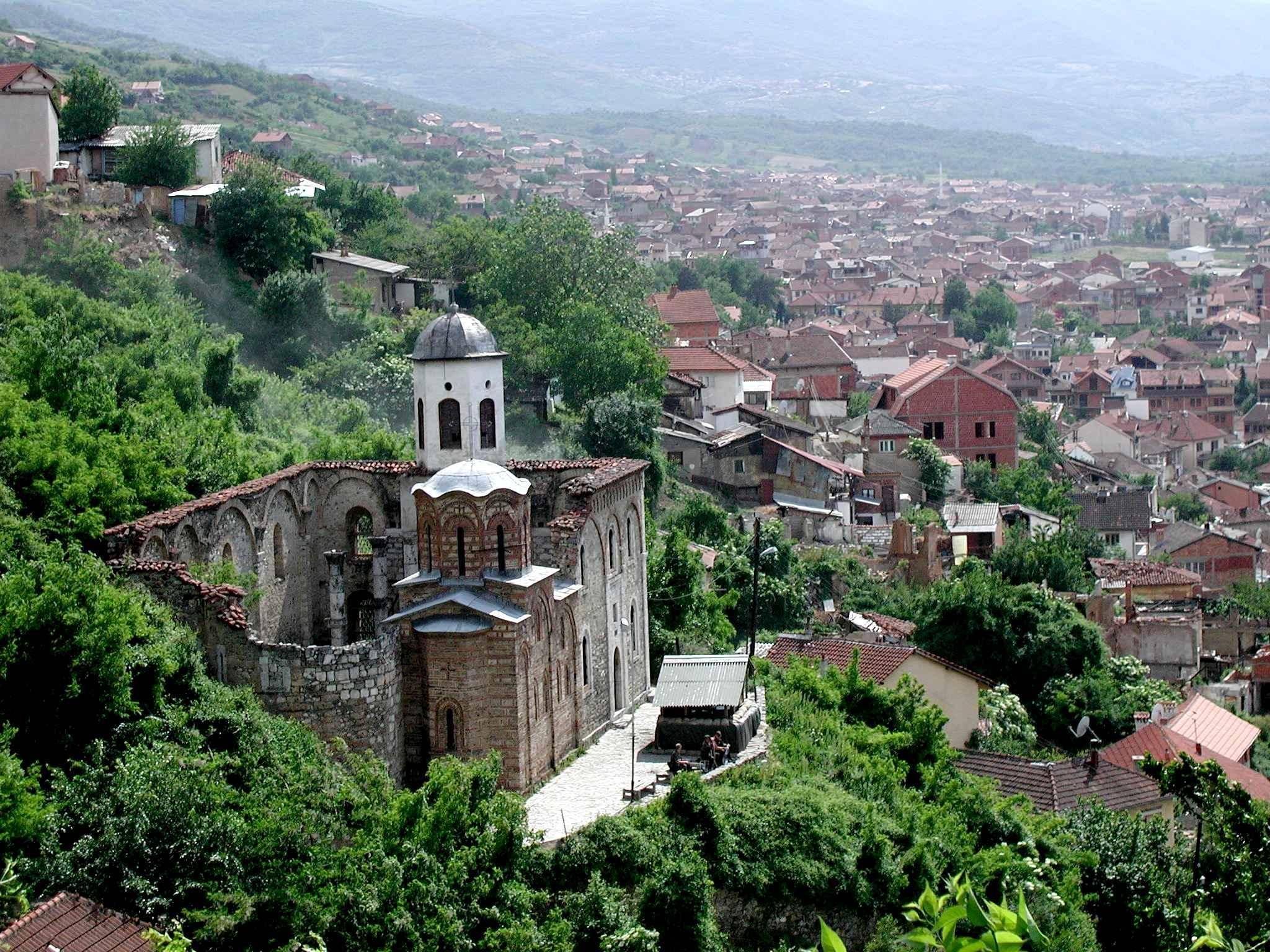
Ruins of the Church of Holy Salvation, Prizren which was built circa 1330 and destroyed during the 2004 unrest in Kosovo.

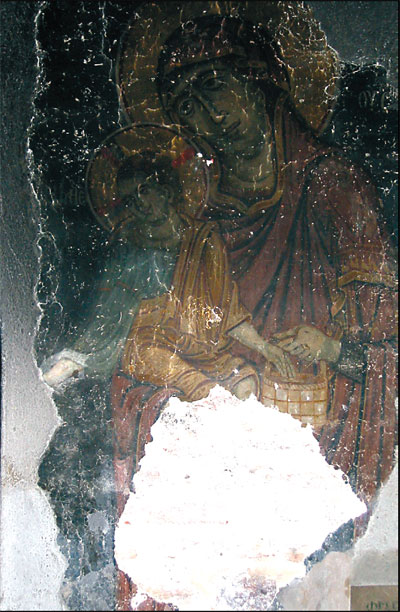
14th-century icon from Our Lady of Ljeviš in Prizren, which was damaged in 2004 by rioters.

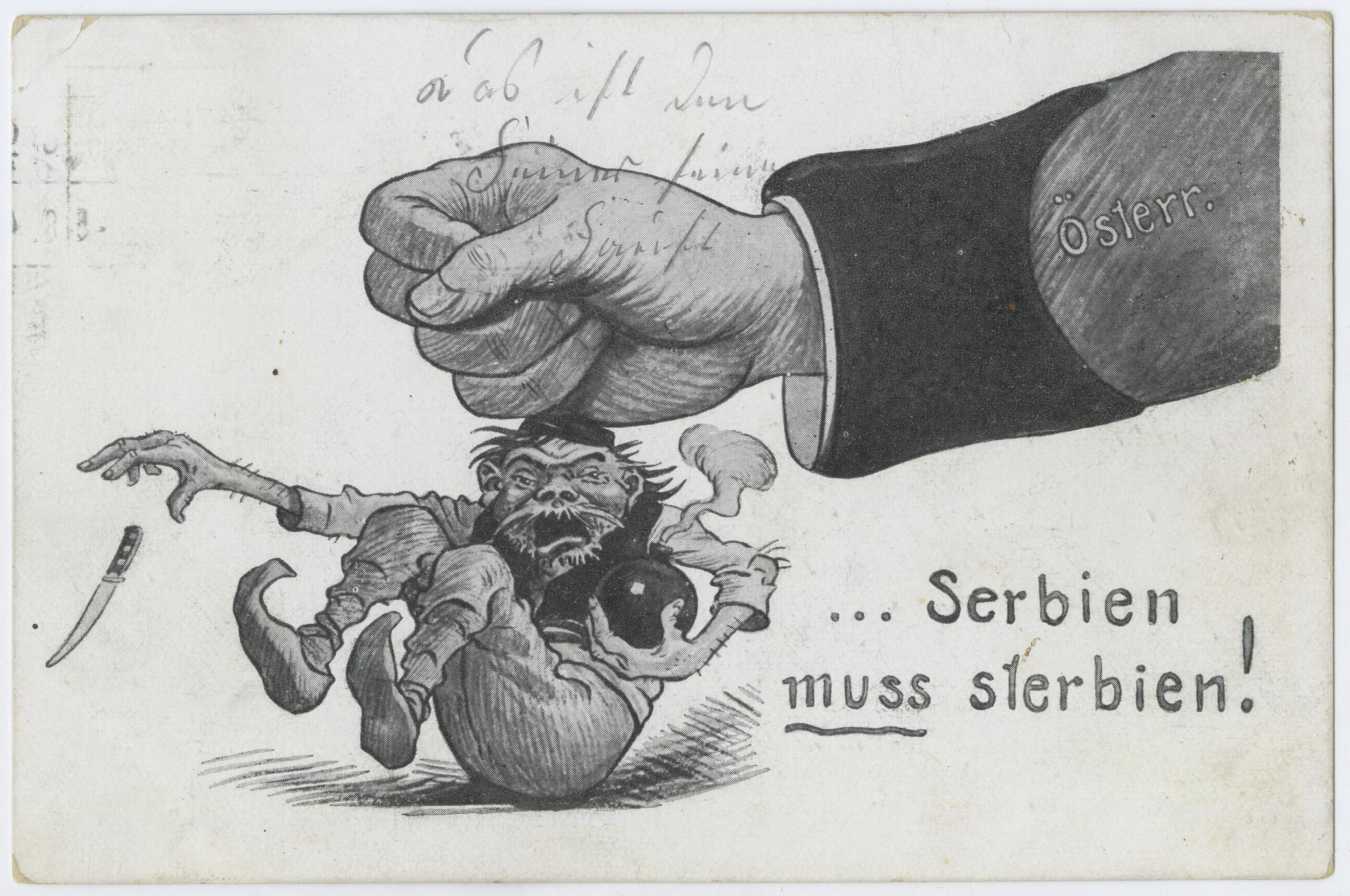
Serbien muss sterbien! ("Serbia must die!"), an Austrian caricature, drawn after the assassination of Archduke Franz Ferdinand of Austria in 1914, depicting Serbia as an ape-like terrorist.

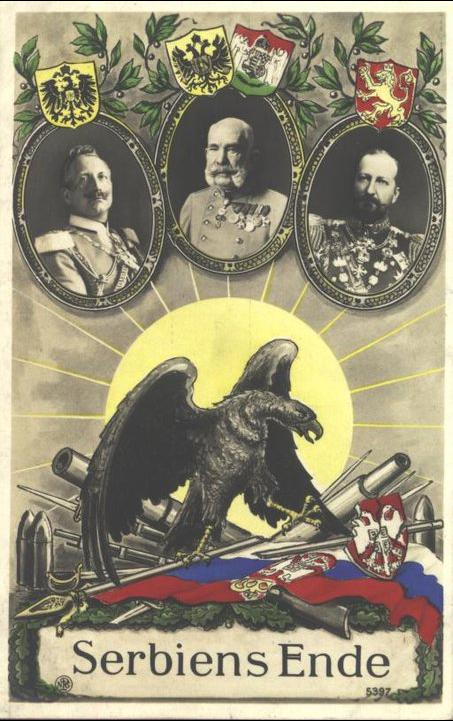
Serbiens ende ("Serbia's end"), propaganda postcard commemorating the victory of the Central Powers over Serbia in 1915.

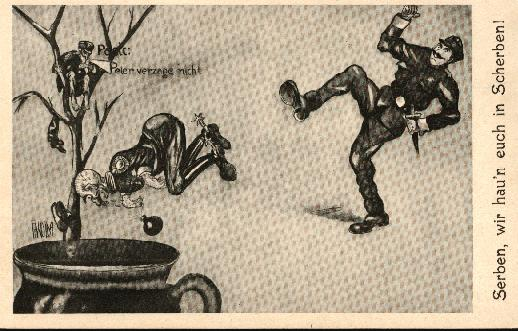
Austro-Hungarian propaganda postcard saying "Serbs, we'll smash you to pieces!"

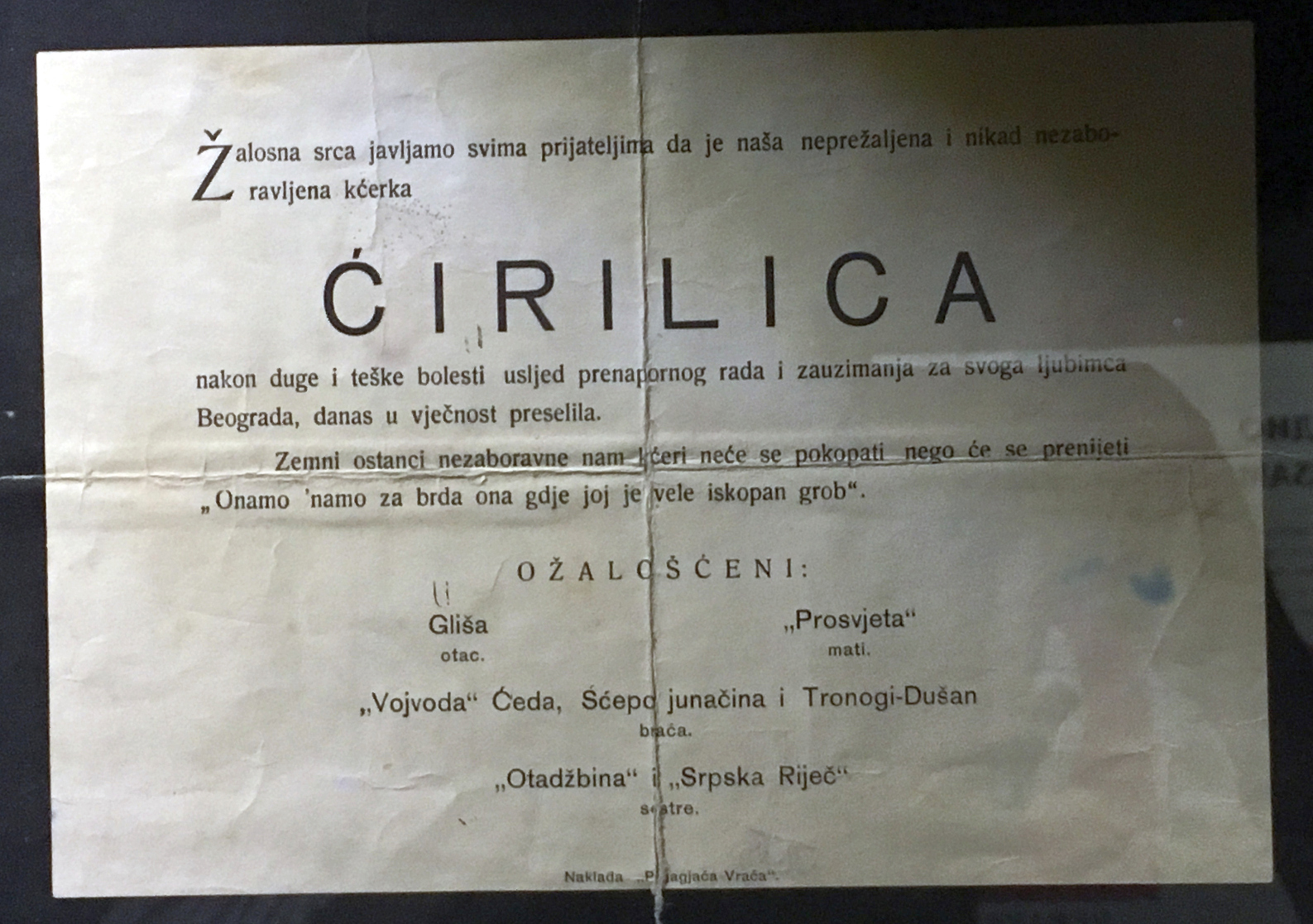
A cynical death obituary of Serbian Cyrillic, published by Austria-Hungary during the occupation of Belgrade

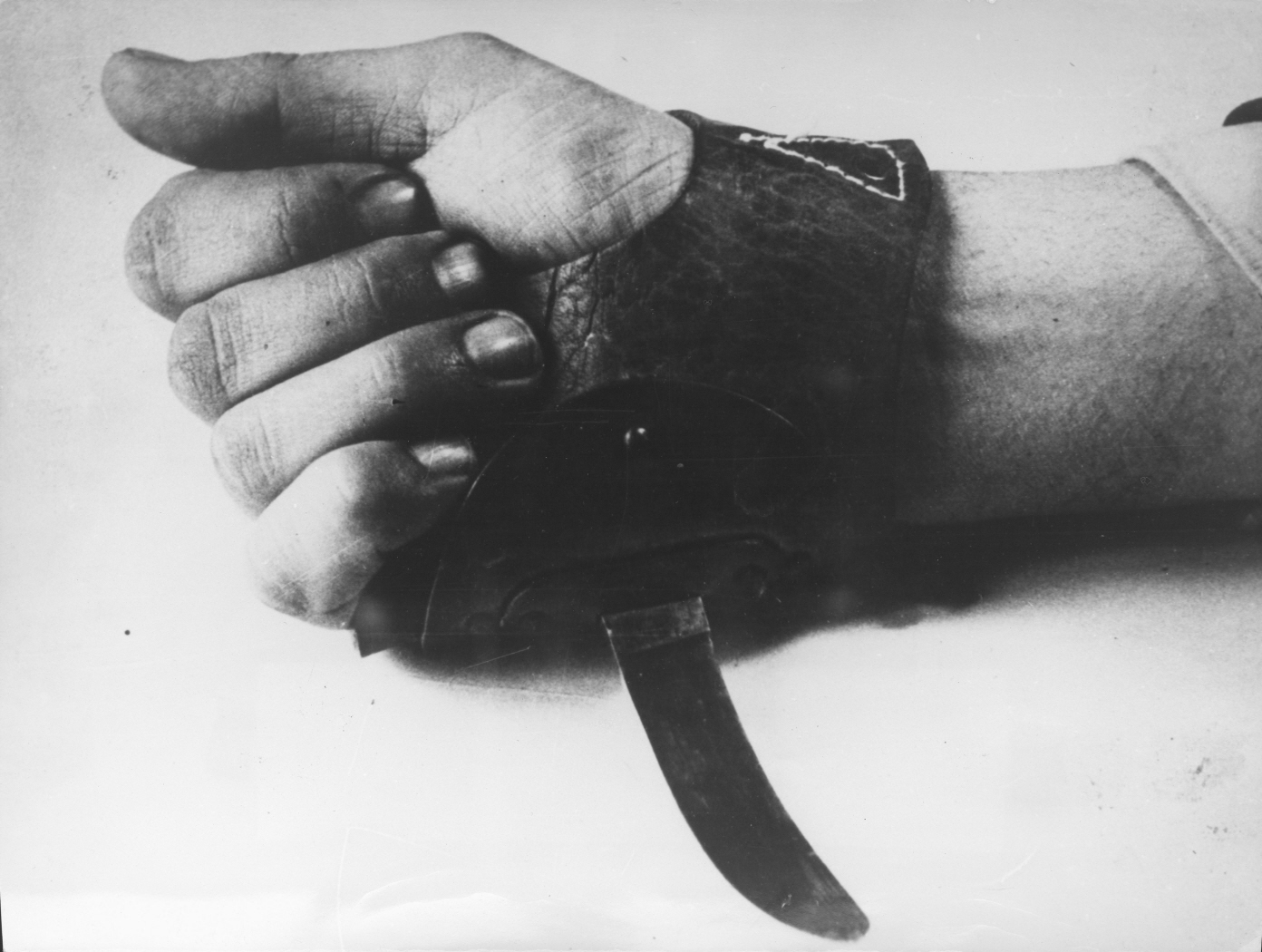
The srbosjek ("Serb cutter"), a special knife worn over the hand that was used by the Ustaše for the quick slaughter of inmates, notably in the Jasenovac concentration camp in the Nazi puppet Independent State of Croatia.

== See also ==
- Serbian Question
- Persecution of Eastern Orthodox Christians
- Anti-Serb riots in Sarajevo
- 1991 anti-Serb riot in Zadar
- Panda Bar incident
- Podujevo bus bombing
- Goraždevac murders
- Anti-Slavic sentiment

== Sources ==
Books

- Banac, Ivo (1988). The National Question in Yugoslavia: Origins, History, Politics. Cornell University Press. ISBN 978-0-8014-9493-2.
- Bataković, Dušan T., ed. (2005). Histoire du peuple serbe [History of the Serbian People] (in French). Lausanne: L'Age d'Homme. ISBN 978-2825119587.
- Carmichael, Cathie (2012). Ethnic Cleansing in the Balkans: Nationalism and the Destruction of Tradition. Routledge. ISBN 978-1-134-47953-5.
- Ćirković, Sima (2004). The Serbs. Malden: Blackwell Publishing. ISBN 978-1405142915.
- Ekmečić, Milorad (2000). Srbofobija i antisemitizam. Beli anđeo.
- Klajn, Lajčo (2007). The Past in Present Times: The Yugoslav Saga. University Press of America. p. 17. ISBN 978-0-7618-3647-6.
- Korb, Alexander (2010). "A Multipronged Attack: Ustaša Persecution of Serbs, Jews, and Roma in Wartime Croatia". Eradicating Differences: The Treatment of Minorities in Nazi-Dominated Europe. Newcastle upon Tyne: Cambridge Scholars Publishing. pp. 145–163. ISBN 978-1443824491.
- Krakov, Stanislav (1990) [1930]. Plamen četništva (in Serbian). Belgrade: Hipnos. (in Serbian)
- Jelavich, Charles; Jelavich, Barbara (1986). The Establishment of the Balkan National States, 1804–1920. University of Washington Press. ISBN 978-0-295-96413-3.
- Jovanović, Batrić (1989). Peta kolona antisrpske koalicije: odgovori autorima Etnogenezofobije i drugih pamfleta. Sloboda. ISBN 9788642100920.
- Little, David (2007). Peacemakers in Action: Profiles of Religion in Conflict Resolution. Cambridge University Press. ISBN 978-0-521-85358-3.
- MacDonald, David Bruce (2002). Balkan Holocausts?: Serbian and Croatian Victim Centred Propaganda and the War in Yugoslavia. Manchester University Press. ISBN 0-7190-6466-X.
- McCormick, Rob (2008). "The United States' Response to Genocide in the Independent State of Croatia, 1941–1945". Genocide Studies and Prevention. 3 (1): 75–98.
- Meier, Viktor (2013). Yugoslavia: A History of Its Demise. Routledge. ISBN 978-1-134-66511-2.
- Mitrović, Andrej (2007). Serbia's Great War, 1914–1918. West Lafayette, Indiana: Purdue University Press. ISBN 978-1-55753-476-7.
- Pavlowitch, Stevan K. (2002). Serbia: The History behind the Name. London: Hurst & Company. ISBN 978-1850654773.
- Pavlowitch, Stevan K. (2008). Hitler's New Disorder: The Second World War in Yugoslavia. Columbia University Press. ISBN 978-0-231-70050-4.
- Ramet, Sabrina P. (1998). Nihil Obstat: Religion, Politics, and Social Change in East-Central Europe and Russia. Duke University Press. ISBN 978-0-8223-2070-8.
- Ramet, Sabrina P. (2006). The Three Yugoslavias: State-building and Legitimation, 1918-2005. Indiana University Press. ISBN 978-0-253-34656-8.
- Ramet, Sabrina P. (2007). The Independent State of Croatia 1941-45. Routledge. ISBN 978-0-415-44055-4.
- Skendi, Stavro (2015). The Albanian National Awakening. Princeton University Press. ISBN 978-1-4008-4776-1.
- Štrbac, Savo (2015). Gone with the Storm: A Chronicle of Ethnic Cleansing of Serbs from Croatia. Knin-Banja Luka-Beograd: Grafid, DIC Veritas. ISBN 978-9995589806.
- Tomasevich, Jozo (2001). War and Revolution in Yugoslavia, 1941–1945: Occupation and Collaboration. Vol. 2. San Francisco: Stanford University Press. ISBN 0-8047-3615-4.
- Trbovich, Ana S. (2008). A Legal Geography of Yugoslavia's Disintegration. Oxford University Press. ISBN 978-0-19-533343-5.
- Wingfield, Nancy M., ed. (2003). Creating the Other: Ethnic Conflict & Nationalism in Habsburg Central Europe. Berghahn Books. ISBN 978-1782388524.

Journals

- Božić, Sofija (2010). "Serbs in Croatia (1918–1929): Between the myth of "Greater-Serbian Hegemony" and social reality". Balcanica (41): 185–208. doi:10.2298/BALC1041185B.
