= Violence against Serbs during the late Ottoman era =

Violence against Serbs in the late Ottoman era

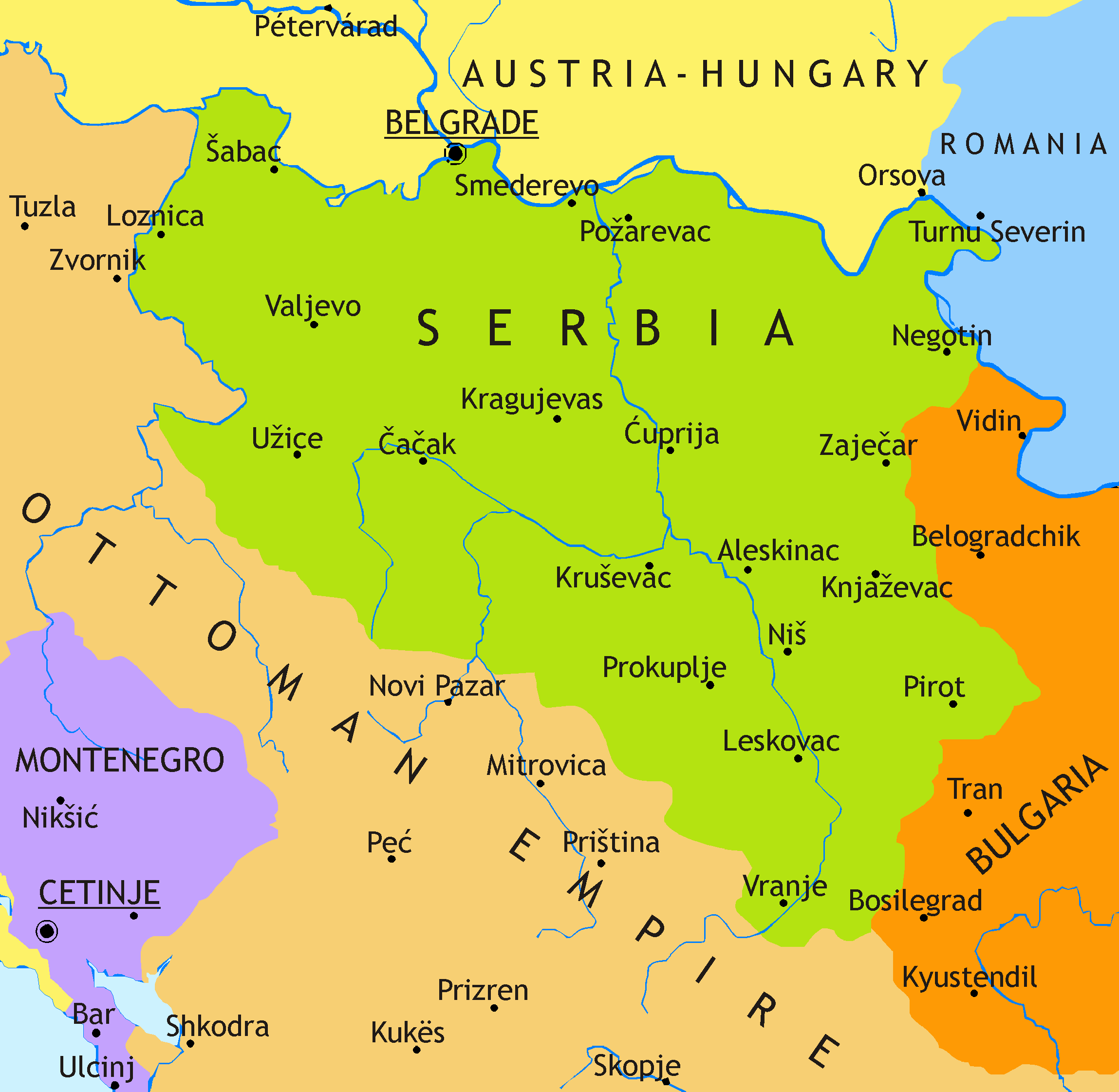
- Map of the borders of the Principality of Serbia and the Ottoman Empire in 1878.
- Location: Rumelia, Ottoman Empire (now Balkans)
- Date: 1878–1912
- Target: Serbs
- Attack type: Massacres, looting, arson, ethnic cleansing, expulsion, rape, torture, kidnappings
- Victims: 60,000 Serbs migrated from Kosovo between 1876–1912 and many others were killed
- Perpetrators: Albanian armed bands, Albanian refugees, Ottoman Army, Turkish gendarmes, Circassian irregulars
- Motive: Anti-Serb sentiment Revenge for expulsions of Albanians from the area of Niš in 1877–1878

The Principality of Serbia received autonomy from the Ottoman Empire in the early 19th century, but a notable Serb population remained to the south, outside of the borders of the principality. With the Serbian–Ottoman Wars (1876–1878) and the Congress of Berlin, the Serbian borders were expanded. During this time and thereafter, numerous instances of violent acts were perpetrated towards local Serb populations. Tens of thousands of Serbs would emigrate from Kosovo alone from 1876 to 1912, along with several others being killed, kidnapped, or otherwise brutalized in periodic attacks.

== 19th century ==
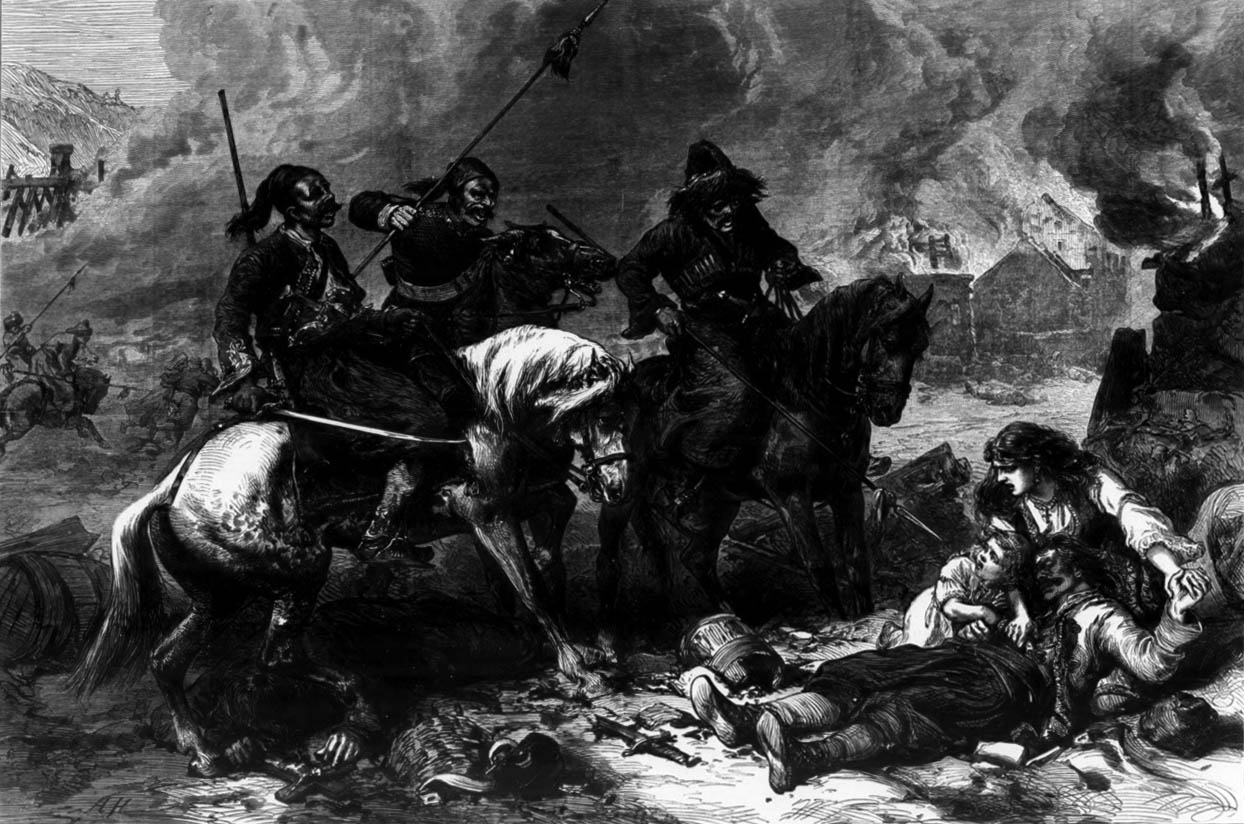
Bashi-Bazouks burning a village.

The Ottoman Empire saw growing political and economical crisis in the mid-18th century which led to feudal anarchy. The European-Ottoman wars and new economic relations broke the Ottoman feudal system and effected the emancipation of Christians in the empire, especially in the Balkans. The rayah (subordinated Christians) were subject to forced labour (known as chiflik), terror from authorities, forced migration, epidemics and starvation. Serbs had joined the Austrian wars against the Ottomans and suffered consequences due to their failure. Out of all Serb-inhabited areas in the Rumelia Eyalet, the most homogenous was the Pashalik of Belgrade.

The territory of modern Serbia was outside Austrian focus after the Austro-Turkish War (1737–1739) and peace signed in 1747. Russian victories (1768–1774) and intention to liberate the Balkans prompted Austria to ally in 1782, also dividing spheres of influence, with a Serbian state not included in any plan. Austria did not join Russia when it occupied Crimea but instead initiated contact with the agitated Serbs of the Belgrade Pashalik. The Serbs were oppressed by the Ottoman authorities and Janissaries and were eager to form alliances with Christian states in order to liberate themselves. The Ottomans declared war on Russia in 1787 and Austria joined in February 1788. In 1787 the Serbs were violently disarmed by the Ottoman authorities during the Austrian war preparations, with terror carried out by military and bashi-bazouk irregular units leading to people fleeing across the Sava and Danube to Austrian territory and forming the Serbian Free Corps. Serb volunteers actively engaged Ottoman troops and raided ships on the Danube, and liberated many towns in central Serbia, however, much needed aid and equipment was denied. Successful Ottoman counter-operations and terror led to further flight to Austria, numbering 50,000 by late June 1788. The Austrian court increasingly sought to end the conflict and peace was signed in August 1791, returning central Serbia to Ottoman rule. The Porte gave amnesty to participants on the Austrian side and banned the Janissaries from the Pashalik. The Janissaries had earlier been part of the backbone of Ottoman military power but had lost their importance in the 18th century, becoming a source of disorder, due to lack of discipline and bad morals. The reign of Selim III saw internal conflicts, with tumult among the pashas, ayans and kircalis. The Janissaries revolted in the Belgrade Pashalik in the 1790s, but were decisively defeated by a Serb militia, which led to the Porte issuing firmans (decrees) which acknowledged Serb self-governing privileges, better socio-economic status, the right to renew and build churches, and to lead security detachments for maintaining road safety and apprehending robbers. Muslim retaliation and entry to Serb villages was forbidden, as to not make way for conflict. This significant improvement did not last long, as new conflicts with Janissaries arose and the external threats forced the Porte to allow the return of Janissaries in early 1799. The Janissaries renewed terror against the Serbs in the Pashalik, captured Belgrade and the Vizier in July 1801, murdered him in December, then ruled the Pashalik. The leading Janissaries, called the Dahije, abolished the Serbs' firmans, banished unsupportive sipahi and invited Muslims from neighbouring sanjaks which they used to control the Serbs. The banished sipahi and loyal Muslims organized a rebellion against the Janissaries with Serb support in mid-1802, but it failed, resulting in further oppression. The "Slaughter of the Knezes" led to the uprising against the Dahije in 1804 and the start of the Serbian Revolution. The Janissaries were disbanded in 1826.

In the 19th century, the Serbs that lived in the Ottoman Empire experienced various forms of oppression, most of which went unreported due to a fear of reprisals. Those who filed complaints were often ignored or faced unjust Ottoman court rulings, and their hope for support rested in the consulates of the Great Powers that had been opened on Ottoman territory, particularly those of the Russians. The Russians had declared themselves to be the "protectors" of Orthodox Christians within the Ottoman empire. Partially due to the increasing pressures they placed on the Ottomans, the Sultan issued a series of reforms, some of which sought to improve the positions of Orthodox Christians within the empire. As a result, an increasing number of petitions and complaints were written by Serbs, and increasing violence by Muslim populations was exhibited towards the Serbs, who were seen as the main culprits behind the reforms.

In 1854, Vasilije Đorđević from Pristina informed Toma Kovačević about incidents in the Kosovo region, including kidnapping of women and girls and Islamization. European courts received complaints about the oppression of Christians and thus put pressure on the Porte to improve the situation. In this regard, Grand Vizier Kıbrıslı Mehmed Pasha set out to investigate matters in Rumelia ("European Turkey"). Upon hearing this, local Muslims put further pressure on the Christians in an attempt to steer them from testifying. Kıbrıslı travelled from Vidin via Pirot to Niš, where he received complaints from the Muslims that the Christians had revolted, refused to work, and had pushed them from their properties. Upon hearing this, Kıbrıslı had notable Serbs in Pirot and Niš killed, and some Serbs who escaped to Serbia informed the government about this act. The archimandrite of the Dečani Monastery, Serafim Ristić, had collected some complaints that he then gave to Kıbrıslı in Podujeva in September 1860, but no measures were taken and Kıbrıslı returned back to Istanbul. Serafim turned the complaints into a book, labelled the Cry of Old Serbia, which he published in 1864.

Of all the international consulates that had opened in the Ottoman Empire, the Russian consul in Prizren, Ivan Jastrebov (t. 1870–74; 1879; 1881–86), was the only consul who sought to improve the status of the Serbs. The Serbs in Ottoman territory had virtually no protection before the opening of Serbian consulates in 1889.

== Events in the Serbian–Ottoman Wars (1876–1878) ==
=== 1876 Timok and Morava devastation ===
In 1876, the Ottoman army fought mainly in the Timok and Morava valleys in the territory of the Principality of Serbia, which resulted in the destruction of local areas. The Ottoman army was accompanied by Circassians and bashi-bozuks that had systematically pillaged and burnt down villages that they came across. Some of the crimes committed against the civilian population included murders, torture, rape, and slavery, and the victims included children and the elderly. Knjaževac, Zaglavak, Svrlig and their surroundings were destroyed. Osman Pasha, who had encouraged the plundering, later forbade it as he was threatened with the death penalty. The front page of The Illustrated London News of 9 September 1876 was of the plunder of Knjaževac. On 22 August 1876 Đura Horvatović wrote about the atrocities in Knjaževac, where the burnt bodies often showed signs of torture. Zaječar, which was evacuated by the Ottomans on 23 March 1877, had been completely pillaged, with houses burnt down and the church and graveyard desecrated with bodies thrown around. Aleksinac was evacuated by the Ottomans on 6 March 1877, and the houses were partly burnt, and bodies were found in wells, as in other settlements, and the local church survived destruction as it had been transformed into a mosque. In the five okrug of Aleksinac, Kruševac, Krajina, Crna Reka and Knjaževac, some 221 villages and three towns were burnt down and pillaged by the Ottoman forces. Refugees moved to the interior and a government department for the care of refugees from the frontiers, Old Serbia and Bosnia and Herzegovina was set up on 30 September 1876. By late 1876 there were 140,000 refugees in Serbia, out of which 87,948 were from the five frontier okrugs.

=== 1877–78 Sanjak of Niš and Muslim refugees ===
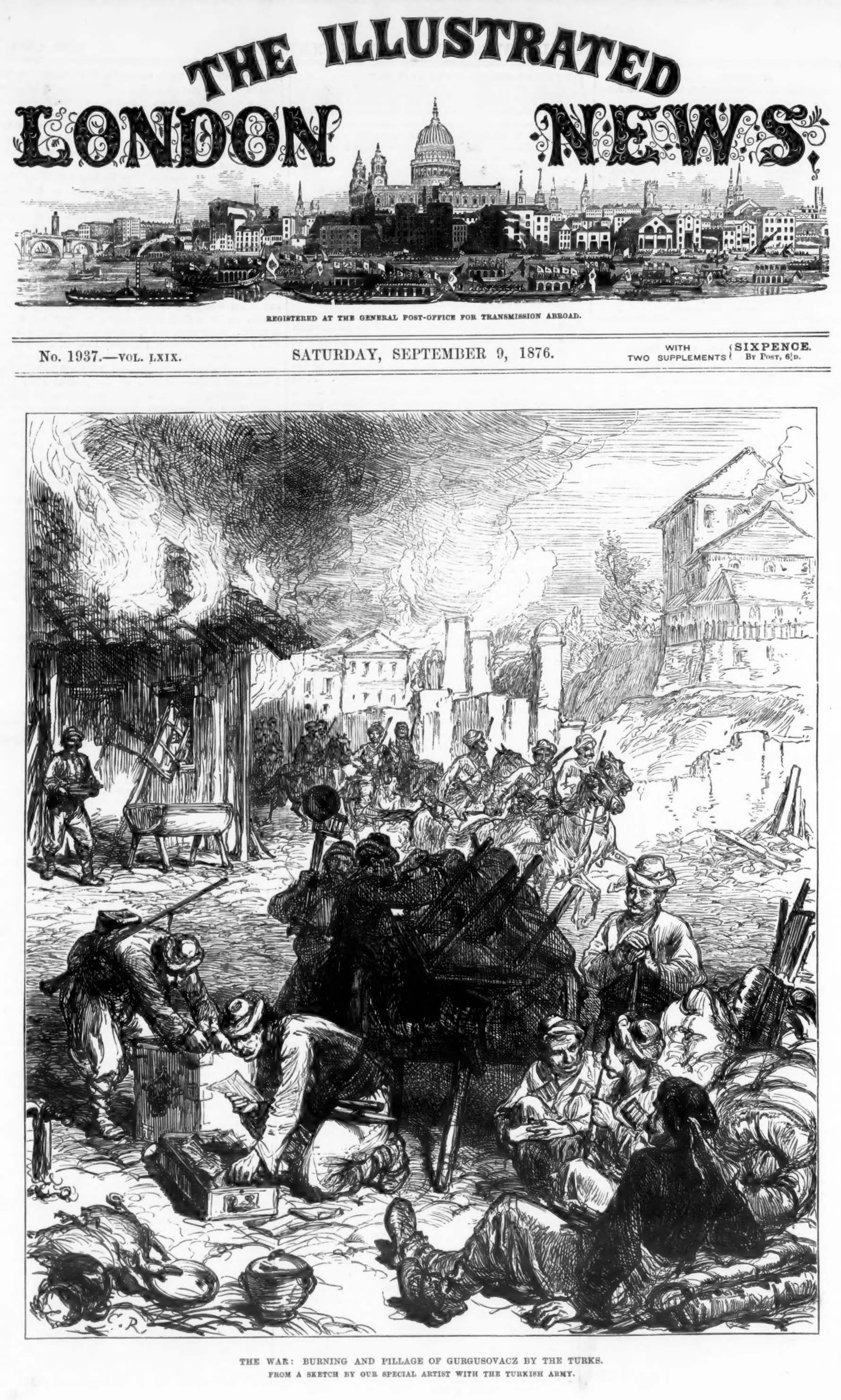
Plundering of Knjaževac, in The Illustrated London News (1876).

Albanians inhabited large parts of the Sanjak of Niš and formed the majority in certain areas, with modern estimates stating that the region contained more than 110,000 Albanians prior to their mass expulsion. The 1877–78 war brought Serbia into conflict with the Albanians, as they had inhabited parts of the newly-conquered territories in the Sanjak of Niš and had fought in the Ottoman army against the Serbs to defend their homes during the latter's offensive campaign in the region. The Serbian government considered the Albanians to be an "undesirable" and "unreliable" population that had to be replaced with a more convenient one, and they believed that Serbia should become an ethnically homogeneous country. Additionally, the territories inhabited by the Albanians was to become the base for future expansions into Kosovo and North Macedonia. As such, between 1877-78, tens of thousands of Muslims - most of whom were Albanians - were expelled by the Serbian army; the majority had left during the course of Serbian military operations in the area, and the rest were expelled after the conclusion of the war. Estimates on the exact number of Albanians and Muslims expelled from the Sanjak of Niš vary; western officials had reported a total of 60,000 Muslim refugees in Macedonia and 60-70,000 Albanian refugees in the Vilayet of Kosovo. Other modern estimates range from 70,000, of which 49,000 are estimated to be Albanians, all the way up to 160,000 Albanians. At the same time, during the Ottoman retreat from the region, Sultan Abdul Hamid II unleashed his auxiliary troops consisting of Kosovar Albanians on the remaining Serbs.

This mass expulsion would have long-term negative effects on Serbian-Albanian relations. The new Balkan Christian states pursued ethnic homogenisation policies through expelling Muslims, and this was the first gross injustice committed by Serbian forces against Albanians. It radicalized Muslim Albanian refugees who retaliated against the Serbs in Kosovo, and greatly contributed to the formation of the Albanian nationalist League of Prizren. These Albanian refugees were settled in the eastern border area of Kosovo, where Serbs had been forced out by the Ottoman authorities. Some scholars view the 1877–78 expulsions as crucial in the interethnic conflict in Kosovo, and from this point, both groups had experiences of mass victimization that served to justify vengeance.

== Post-war events ==
In Toplica, the abandoned houses of Albanians were settled in 1878–79 by refugees from mainly the frontier districts that were devastated in 1876. Montenegrins were settled on the Serbian-Ottoman border on the left banks of Toplica and Kosanica to try and stop Albanian raids into Serbia. The Muslim refugees, or Muhaxhirs, that had been expelled by the Serbs in 1877-1878 were hostile to the Kosovo Serbs, and the Serb population was subject to retaliatory acts by Albanians, particularly after the formation of the League of Prizren following the Berlin Congress (July 1878). In the Pristina, Peja and Prizren sanjaks, several hundred were killed. The Ottoman authorities strategically placed Muslim refugees from Serbia, Montenegro, and Bosnia and Herzegovina in the northern part of the Kosovo Vilayet and actively prevented their repatriation, which was an act that had been advised by the Russian consul Ivan Yastrebov. Additionally, a wave of Muslim Slavs from Bosnia had voluntarily settled in Kosovo as they refused to live under Christian Austrian administration, and they brought with them a strong anti-Christian sentiment to the areas in which they settled.

Serbs began a steady emigration from Kosovo during this period partly as a result of retaliatory attacks from the muhaxhir refugees, but mainly due to the general stagnation and poor administration of the Vilayet of Kosovo. There was no Ottoman state policy of expelling the Serbian population, and therefore the migration of Serbs from Kosovo cannot be compared to the expulsion of Albanians from Serbia. There is a lack of precise numbers regarding the amount of Serbs who left Kosovo during this time, and most of the figures that are commonly quoted come from unreliable estimates made by biased Serbian diplomats or nationalist ethnographers of the time. Only rough estimates can be made for the total number of Serbs who migrated from Kosovo between the years of 1876-1912, with historian Noel Malcolm suggesting a figure of around 60,000. This migration, coupled with the influx of Muslim Albanian refugees, lowered the proportion of Serbs in the Kosovo Vilayet.

The Toplica and Vranje okrug were exposed to incursions of Albanian armed bands in 1878–80. Immediately upon the border delineation of 1878, Albanian bands began to intrude on the Serbian side, and by 1879, the incidents were quite common, consisting primarily of cattle theft, and more rarely, the burning of forests and the killing of villagers. There were 73 intrusions in 1879 in the Toplica and Vranje okrugs, leaving 39 Serbs dead and a further 25 wounded. The Kosovo Vilayet's authorities were informed about the incidents, but they did not intervene. The Vilayet's authorities arrested the perpetrators of an intrusion in May 1879, but they were freed after pressure from the League of Prizren. In 1880, the Serbian government acknowledged individual intrusions, but they were not concerned about the matter.

After the Ottoman suppression of the League of Prizren in 1881, the state of the Serbs did not improve, as the Porte still favoured Albanians over Serbs. An Ottoman military court was set up in Pristina in the springtime of 1882 which initially focused on indicting Albanian nationalist leaders, and it was then was then used to incriminate leading Serbs. In five years of activity, some 300 Serb teachers, clergy and merchants were imprisoned on fabricated charges. This was done as a warning to the Serbs in case of future wars. The Porte viewed the Albanians as trusted border protection and as a backbone of Ottoman military, with leading Albanians being part of the upper class of the Ottoman feudal system.

On 10 July 1882, archimandrite Sava Dečanac wrote a national-political programme to Prime Minister Milan Piroćanac that discussed the state of Serbs in Kosovo, in which he claimed that the Serb population was supposedly in danger of disappearing under pressure from the Albanians. In March 1883, Đorđe Kamperelić managed to escape his transfer to Asia Minor as a convict of the Pristina military court, and arrived in Serbia where the government was informed of the state of Serbs in connection with the court. In 1883, British archaeologist Arthur Evans travelled to the Kosovo Vilayet and reported that Serbs were victims of tyranny, oppression, murder, forced labour, extortion, and extraordinary taxation, "in the most abject state of misery and degradation".

In 1885–86, Albanian incursions into the border area continued, mostly for theft, but 38 Serbs were killed and many wounded. In 1886, the Porte allowed Serbia to open consulates in Ottoman territory. In 1887, the vice-consul at Skopje claimed that there was banditry and violence in the whole area between Pristina, Prizren and the Montenegrin–Ottoman border. The archimandrite Rafailo of the Dečani monastery also complained about the lawlessness. There were reports of almost daily murders, and it seems that it was worse in the Peja nahiya. In 1887, there were more incursions from both sides, but far more by Albanians. Complaints proved fruitless as the Ottoman authorities sided with the Albanians. In March 1889 groups of armed Albanians from the Mitrovica and Vushtrrikaza crossed the Kopaonik into Serbian territory. Murders and threats to safety made over 500 people move to Raška. By 1889, many from the Peja area had fled to Serbia. An Ottoman–Serbian border commission met in 1889, which lowered Albanian incursions.

In 1889, the Serbian consulate in Pristina was opened, which saw an increase in reports on acts committed against Serbs. There were risks to both the Serbs who came and told of the problems and to the consuls themselves, and the consuls were unable to offer more than comfort in words as they were limited in their work by the Ottoman authorities and the position of the young Serbian state. Many Muslim Albanians viewed these developments as the first steps towards a Serbian annexation of Kosovo, and a year later, the consul Luka Marinković was murdered. The new consul at Prizren reported in August 1890 that the Ottoman authorities were helpless, and he feared that by next year, the Serbs could disappear from Kosovo, especially from the Peja nahiya.

== 1890s ==
In the beginning of 1891, the Albanians of Drenica rose up in revolt against the Ottomans, which resulted in many Serbs from the Peja, Mitrovica, Pristina, Vushtrri and Gjilan nahiyas fleeing to Serbia. Stojan Novaković's impression of the situation was that the Yıldız, perhaps with the Porte's support, had a plan to destroy the Serbs in Kosovo and to strengthen the Albanian element. At the end of 1892, the situation seemed to have calmed down after the international powers suggested a commission to investigate and improve the situation in the Kosovo Vilayet. However, in 1893, small-scale rebellions under Haxhi Zeka in Peja and in Prizren, showed that much wasn't needed for the situation to blaze up again.

From 1894, the Ottoman Empire found itself in internal crisis with national liberation movements of Armenians and on Crete. Armenians were massacred. Greece, which supported the Cretans, was defeated in the Greco-Turkish War (1897). Some 10,000 Albanians volunteered in the Ottoman army in that war. The Balkan states stayed out of that conflict and first and foremost Russia and Austria-Hungary wanted to calm things down as to not risk a greater conflict in the Balkans, thus, they worked for attaining Cretan autonomy in 1898. In case of disintegration of European Turkey, Austria-Hungary supported an independent Albania. From 1894, attacks on property and Serbs intensified in comparison to earlier years, leading to migrations from Kosovo, especially in the Peja nahiya. The Greco-Turkish War (1897) resulted in further deterioration of the situation, with the Albanians, who participated in the war, being a security for upholding Ottoman Europe and at the same contributing to anarchy. Serbs in the Ottoman Empire were maltreated and accused of being Serbian agents during and after the Greco-Turkish War. Panic ensued, and Serbs, primarily from the Ottoman border areas, fled to Serbia. As to not risk another conflict and fearing that European powers would take serious steps to ensure the protection of Christian subjects, the sultan decided to disarm the Albanians, which they refused upon meeting in late January 1899.

== Early 20th century ==
In May 1901, Albanian bands partially set Sjenica, Novi Pazar and Pristina on fire. Having served in the Ottoman forces during the Greco-Turkish War (1897), Albanians later used weapons they had retained—rather than surrendering them to the Turkish authorities—against the Serbs in Old Serbia. Albanians massacred a considerable number of Serbs in Ibarski Kolašin during the summer. Ibarski Kolašin (now known as North Kosovo) was a forested region made up of 40 villages, largely inhabited by Serbs, where Serbian teachers and priests were active, which had long irritated the Albanians and Ottoman government; Serbs were continuously maltreated in the region. Initially, the Sublime Porte did not suppress the local Albanian movements nor did it protect the Serbs. The Serbian government observed the developments in Kolašin, and did not remain idle. The Ottomans eventually intervened; the governor (vali) was dismissed, and several other anti-Serb officials and Albanian chieftains who had been especially cruel were removed from their posts. The 1901 events were instrumental in the 'Kolašin affair', a diplomatic conflict between Austria-Hungary, which supported the Albanians, and Serbia, which was supported by Russia. In the beginning of 1902, there were attacks on Serbs in the villages of Kopaonik. Albanians rose up due to the November 1902 reforms that would have given Christians improved rights. Persecution of Serbs in the Vushtrri area and failure of reforms led to the migration of Serbs to Toplica in 1903.

The pressures exerted by the Great Powers on the Ottoman Empire typically increased the suspicions and hostilities between Albanian Muslims and their Christian neighbours, and the general deterioration between the two groups during this period should be blamed primarily on external developments of this sort. As part of a long-standing tradition, Albanians had protected the Visoki Dečani monastery as late as 1898, but when the Metropolitan introduced Russian monks to the monastery, this greatly intensified the hostility of the Muslims. Even Serbian diplomats had begun to become irritated by the degree of Russian interference in Kosovo, and Serbian consular official Milan Rakić noted in 1905 that Serb villagers in the region of Deçan had absurdly begun to identify as Russians.

Wilder and misleading claims were made by Serbs during that period of time, particularly by the Serbian consul. Rakić pointed out that Serb peasants would exaggerate their sufferings in order to get financial or material help and that the number of Serb deaths was constantly overstated. In the first five months of 1905, 25 Serbs were killed in Kosovo; four of them by other Serbs and three by unknown killers. Rakić noted that many more people were killed in Serbia in the same period, and despite the aforementioned statistic, contemporary Serbian bulletins would falsely claim that Serbs were being murdered every day. Rakić also strongly criticised the Serbian consul's suggestions of stirring up feuds amongst the Albanians as well as their sponsoring of armed Serbian bands, some of which were active in Kosovo. These armed bands would sometimes fight pitched battles against local Albanians, and they significantly harmed relations between Albanians and Serbs.

== Sources ==
- Bodrožić, Đuro (2019). "Nacionalna država u Prvom srpskom ustanku". Politička revija. 62 (4): 87–107.
- Lukić, Tamara; Ćurčić, Nevena (2014). "Ethno-demographic situation". In Božić, Sofija (ed.). Istorija i geografija: susreti i prožimanja [History and geography: meetings and permeations]. SANU. pp. 281–298. ISBN 978-86-7005-125-6.
- Frantz, Eva Anne (2009). "Violence and its Impact on Loyalty and Identity Formation in Late Ottoman Kosovo: Muslims and Christians in a Period of Reform and Transformation". Journal of Muslim Minority Affairs. 29 (4): 460–461. doi:10.1080/13602000903411366. S2CID 143499467.
- Jagodić, Miloš (2011). "Планови o политици Србије према Старој Србији и Македонији (1878-1885)". Историјски часопис. 60: 435–460 – via CEEOL.
- Jagodić, Miloš (2004). "Upadi Albanaca u Srbiju 1879. godine" [Albanian incursions into Serbia 1879] (PDF). Historical Review. 51. Archived from the original on 2015-11-17.
- Jagodić, Miloš (2000a). "Posledice upada Turaka u Timočku i Moravsku dolinu 1876. godine". Razvitak. XL (203–204): 130-.
- Jagodić, Miloš (2000b). "Naseljavanje Topličkog okruga 1878-1879. godine". Godišnjak. VII (1).
- Jagodić, Miloš (1998). "The Emigration of Muslims from the New Serbian Regions 1877/1878". Balkanologie. 2 (2): 99–122.
- Lampe, John R. (28 March 2000). Yugoslavia as History: Twice There Was a Country. Cambridge University Press. ISBN 978-0-521-77401-7.
- Little, David (2007). Peacemakers in Action: Profiles of Religion in Conflict Resolution. Cambridge University Press. ISBN 978-0-521-85358-3.
- Ljubojević, Ratko Lj.; Radović-Stojanović, Jelena V. (2022). "Терор османских власти над српским народом". Тематски зборник „СТРАХ У НАУЧНОМ И УМЕТНИЧКОМ СТВАРАЛАШТВУ“. Лепосавић: Институт за српску културу Приштина: 495–510. ISBN 978-86-89025-80-4.
- Maliković, Dragi (1997). "Prilike na Kosovu i Metohiji kpajem XIX i početkom XX veka i osnivanje konzulata Kraljevine Srbije u Prištini 1889. godine". Baština (8): 11–29. ISSN 0353-9008.
- Petrović, Milić F. (1997). Документа о Рашкој области, 1890-1899. Историјски музеј Србије. ISBN 978-86-82925-01-9.
- Nedeljković, Slaviša D.; Đorđević, Miloš Z. (2015). "Политичке прилике у београдском пашалуку у предвечерје српске револуције (1787-1804)". Teme. XXXIX (3). Niš: 965–969.
- Šešum, Uroš (2018). "ТАЈНЕ ЗАГРАНИЧНЕ АКТИВНОСТИ СРПСКЕ ВЛАДЕ У ОСМАНСКОМ ЦАРСТВУ 1901. ГОДИНЕ". Српске студије. VII. Центар за српске студије.
- Skendi, Stavro (2015). The Albanian National Awakening. Princeton University Press. ISBN 9781400847761.
- Stefanović, Djordje (2005). "Seeing the Albanians through Serbian eyes: The Inventors of the Tradition of Intolerance and their Critics, 1804–1939". European History Quarterly. 35 (3): 469. doi:10.1177/0265691405054219. hdl:2440/124622. S2CID 144497487.
- Stojančević, Vladimir (1990). Srbija i Albanci u XIX i početkom XX veka: ciklus predavanja 10-25. novembar 1987. Srpska akademija nauka i umetnosti. ISBN 9788670250949.
- Stojančević, Vladimir (1998). Srpski narod u Staroj Srbiji u Velikoj istočnoj krizi 1876–1878. Službeni list SRJ.
- Vojvodić, Mihailo (1992). "Прилике на Косову и Метохији". Историјски часопис. 38. Istorijski institut: 163-.
- Zarković, Vesna (2010). "Рад хаџи Серафима Ристића на побољшању положаја српског народа у Старој Србији". Баштина. 29: 69–80.
- Zarković, Vesna (2008). Афера у Ибарском Колашину 1901-1902. године. Институт за српску културу. ISBN 978-86-82797-81-4.
- Zarković, Vesna (2021). "КАЗА МИТРОВИЦА 1889–1900". Баштина. 31 (55): 375-.
