= Fremdvölkische =

Fremdvölkische ('foreign races') was a term used during the Nazi era to describe people who were not of "German or related blood" (Nuremberg Laws). The term at first was used only by members of the Schutzstaffel, but later was used by the Reich police, justice system, and state bureaucracy.

== Folkish community ==
With the Führerprinzip (leadership principle) of Hitler and the Nazi party supremacy over Germany, the fundamental political life of Nazism was primarily focused on the Aryan race, but also the pan-German nationalism that was to make sure the Germans belonged to the Volksgemeinschaft (national community). The term "foreign" was not used in reference to migrants but rather racially defined as those who were German citizens but not of German or related blood. In 1935, after the Third Reich introduced the Nuremberg race laws, the foreign races who were defined as Jews, Gypsies, and blacks were banned from the civil service, from having sexual relations with Aryans, and were given "non-Aryan" status. These laws affected not only non-Aryans, but also opponents of the Nazis, who were similarly banned from the civil service.

== People of Central Europe and Eastern Europe ==
The Nazi policy of Lebensraum (living space) in the East called for Germans to settle there and the whole area to undergo a process of Germanization for the creation of a Greater Germanic Reich. The people of these areas were targeted as "foreign Nationalists", not "foreign races", since Slavs were not a distinct race, even according to Nazi racial science (Hans F. K. Günther - called - race-Günther - 1930). Thus, the notion of foreign was used not only for people who were classified as racially different but also people who were not part of the German community. In Mein Kampf, Hitler criticized previous Germanization towards ethnic Poles, whom he regarded as belonging to a non-Germanic "foreign race". In his 1928 unpublished book Zweites Buch, Hitler stated that the Nazis would never Germanize any foreign elements such as the Poles or Czechs as it would lead to a racial weakening of the German people.

According to Nazi ideology, Slavic people were uncultured and inferior. The Nazis feared the fertility of the Slavs and called for a depopulation policy towards them. A secret plan called the General Plan East implemented the enslavement, expulsion, and possible extermination of most people of both Central and Eastern Europe. Foreign workers were given the status of Ost-Arbeiter, with estimates putting their numbers between 3 and 5.5 million. The possibility of naturalization came at different levels, however, applied only to annexed eastern territories. Naturalized - but with possibility of withdrawal - were so-called German people...foreign-born Germans living in occupied and annexed areas, as well as in Poland, these Germans were related through marriage, language, and culture.

This served to attract so-called racially valuable children, according to Nazi racial theorists, who were to undergo Germanization and be taken to the Reich and raised as Germans. The aim was to give them German citizenship since the 1935 race laws introduced these people after a period of probation and changed their foreign national status. (This possibility of naturalization, however, did not apply to the "General".)

== History of the term ==
Already in the interwar period of the Weimar Republic the term "fremdvölkisch" appeared in 1926 as part of legal literature regarding the "legal status of minorities". According to some theorists, Danes and Lithuanians were considered "fremdvölkisch", in contrast to Mazury, Friesen, and the Ruhr Poles.

== See also ==
- Nuremberg Laws
- Generalplan Ost
- Lebensraum
- Drang nach Osten
- Umvolkung
