= Immovable Cultural Heritage in the North Banat District =

This list includes Immovable Cultural Heritage sites in the North Banat District of Serbia.

== Cultural Monuments ==
Number in the Central Register	Photo	Name	City / Municipality	Address	Designated since	Classification
SK 1028		Suvača	Kikinda	Kikinda Nemanjina St. no. 118 (corner of Moravska and Nemanjina streets) 45.824155°N 20.453140°E	17 May 1951	Exceptional Importance
SK 1037		Roman Catholic Church	Čoka	Čoka Potiska St. no. 1 45.935815°N 20.140148°E	20 January 1972	Exceptional Importance
SK 1043		Church of St. Nicholas	Kikinda	Kikinda Srpskih dobrovoljaca Square no. 28 45.830084°N 20.465658°E	14 December 1948	Exceptional Importance
SK 1084		Serbian Orthodox Church	Ada	Mol 45.763793°N 20.139128°E	26 June 1974	Great Importance
SK 1143		National Committee Former Building	Novi Kneževac	Srpski Krstur 46.126296°N 20.092049°E	4 April 1972	Great Importance|-
SK 1105		"Vodica" Chapel	Kikinda	Kikinda Put za Vodice St. no. 9 45.804674°N 20.414465°E	15 December 1978	Great Importance
SK 1106		District of Velika Kikinda Building ("Kurija")	Kikinda	Kikinda Srpskih dobrovoljaca Square no. 21 45.830372°N 20.464976°E	4 September 1948	Great Importance
SK 1108		Servijski family Castle (Šulpe's Castle)	Novi Kneževac	Novi Kneževac 46.045312°N 20.088694°E	9 July 1952	Great Importance
SK 1136		Serbian Orthodox Church	Čoka	Sanad 45.975359°N 20.105243°E	12 November 1971	Great Importance
SK 1142		National Committee Former Building	Kikinda	Bašaid Vojvođanska St. no. 56 45.641570°N 20.413949°E	6 September 1968	Great Importance
SK 1145		Birth House of Novak Radonjić	Ada	Mol 45.763082°N 20.139659°E	30 April 1948	Great Importance
SK 1229		Serbian Orthodox Church of St. Michael	Senta	Senta 45.931802°N 20.092579°E	31 December 1948 (iconostasis) 17 December 1970 (whole building)	Great Importance
SK 1230		Senta Town Hall	Senta	Senta 1 M. Tita Square 45.931002°N 20.089002°E	16 April 1985	Great Importance
SK 1231		Firefighter's Barracks in Senta	Senta	Senta 12 Petra Drapšina St. 45.929781°N 20.086523°E	14 May 1975	Great Importance
SK 1232		Presbytery Building - Museum in Senta	Senta	Senta 5 M. Tita Square 45.931840°N 20.089742°E	16 April 1985	Great Importance
SK 1233		Royal Hotel	Senta	Senta 11 J. Đorđevića St 45.932095°N 20.090784°E	16 April 1985	Great Importance
SK 1234		Slavnić House	Senta	Senta 10 Lenjinova St. 45.929371°N 20.090948°E	16 April 1985	Great Importance
SK 1235		Stevan Sremac Birth House	Senta	Senta 4 Stevana Sremca St. 45.931050°N 20.092789°E	27 December 1948	Great Importance
SK 1236		Elementary School in Ada Area	Senta	Gornji Breg VI reon no. 114 45.847806°N 19.965227°E	10 December 1990	Great Importance
SK 1237		Castle of Earl Karas	Kanjiža	Horgoš 46.146393°N 19.969412°E	1 August 1952	Great Importance
SK 1238		Serbian Orthodox Church in Mokrin	Kikinda	Mokrin 45.934478°N 20.410137°E	18 June 1949 (iconostasis) 23 April 1969 (whole building)	Exceptional Importance
SK 1241		Serbian Orthodox Church of the Ascension of Christ	Ada	Ada 45.763082°N 20.139659°E	13 July 1949	Great Importance
SK 1242		Serbian Orthodox Church of the Holy Archangels Michael and Gabriel	Novi Kneževac	Novi Kneževac 46.050470°N 20.093495°E	4 April 1973	Great Importance
SK 1243		Oil Processing Drive in Obilićevo	Novi Kneževac	Novi Kneževac Obilićevo 46.041335°N 20.092397°E	30 March 1966	Great Importance
SK 1244		Serbian Orthodox Church in Čoka	Čoka	Čoka Potiska St. 45.935633°N 20.145493°E	12 November 1971	Great Importance
SK 1259		Čarnojević family Tomb	Kikinda	Rusko Selo 45.760001°N 20.575939°E	14 November 1975	Great Importance
SK 1454		Church of the Holy Archangels Michael and Gabriel	Kikinda	Iđoš 2 Nikole Francuskog St. 44.226862°N 22.531339°E	17 April 1969	Great Importance
SK 1544		Church of the Holy Archangel Michael	Kanjiža	Kanjiža 1 Maršala Tita St. 46.064478°N 20.059179°E	16 July 1952	
SK 1613		Church of the Holy Father Nicholas	Kikinda	Bašaid Vojvođanska St. 45.642381°N 20.415690°E	9 June 1983	
SK 1690		Windmill	Ada	Obornjača 45.770278°N 19.888056°E	11 April 1983	
SK 1691		Church of the Holy Archangels Michael and Gabriel	Novi Kneževac	Banatsko Aranđelovo 95 Vuka Karadžića St. 46.063196°N 20.238818°E	31 October 2002	
SK 1692		Cultural Center Building	Novi Kneževac	Novi Kneževac 6 Kralja Petra St. 46.046829°N 20.089847°E	24 July 2001	
SK 1796		"Stevan Sremac" Elementary School Building	Senta	Kevi 6 Košuta Lajoša St. 45.849402°N 19.878579°E	22 May 2001	
SK 1797		Lederer Castle	Čoka	Čoka Potiska St. 45.941099°N 20.139370°E	26 November 1984	
SK 1802		Train Station Horgoš - Kamaraš	Kanjiža	Horgoš Mali Horgoš 46.164070°N 19.975132°E	26 February 1986	
SK 1803		Cross of the village slava	Ada	Mol M. Tita nn. St. 45.764761°N 20.141234°E	7 June 2001	
SK 1808		Dudvarski Chapel	Ada	Ada Grobljanska nn. St. 45.787143°N 20.134598°E	25 January 2000	
SK 1811		Chapel at the Orthodox Cemetery	Kanjiža	Martonoš 46.109405°N 20.051635°E	25 January 2000	
SK 1813		Servijski Chapel	Novi Kneževac	Novi Kneževac Srpska nn. St. 46.039493°N 20.103386°E	25 January 2000	
SK 1814		Chapel of St. Gabriel at the Orthodox Cemetery	Senta	Senta Karađorđev put nn. St. 45.920752°N 20.096357°E	17 February 2000	
SK 1815		Vujin Chapel	Čoka	Crna Bara Orthodox cemetery 45.973208°N 20.282781°E	10 January 2003	
SK 1822		House at Lenjinov Park no. 14	Senta	Senta 14 Lenjinova St. (Ađanska St.) 45.928962°N 20.091216°E	24 July 2001	
SK 1824		Grain Storehouse	Kanjiža	Horgoš Mali Horgoš 46.150239°N 19.915735°E	22 May 2001	
SK 1827		Villa at Kamaraš Street no. 26	Kanjiža	Horgoš 26 Kamaraš St. 46.162837°N 19.982358°E	24 July 2001	
SK 1828		Vigado Tavern	Kanjiža	Kanjiža Narodni Park nn. 46.060856°N 20.060282°E	24 July 2001	
SK 1830		Windmill	Kanjiža	Orom Narodni Park nn. 45.985334°N 19.852517°E	26 February 1969	
SK 1833		House at Pere Segedinca Street no. 25	Kikinda	Kikinda Pere Segedinca Street no. 25 45.830770°N 20.483547°E	22 July 1997	
SK 1834		Building at Petefi Šandor Street no. 28	Senta	Senta 28 Petefi Šandora St. 45.929245°N 20.079045°E	3 November 1985	
SK 1837		Roman Catholic Church	Čoka	Sanad 45.972222°N 20.104722°E	16 November 1971	
SK 1838		Roman Catholic Church	Novi Kneževac	Novi Kneževac Kralja Petra I St. 46.048293°N 20.089637°E	16 July 1952	
SK 1843		Sebian Orthodox People's School	Kanjiža	Martonoš corner of the street Petrić Radivoja and Pecin Ise 46.115999°N 20.063357°E	18 June 1997	
SK 1844		Church of the Translation of the Relics of Saint Nicholas	Kanjiža	Martonoš 46.116353°N 20.063088°E	10 January 1992	
SK 1845		St. Nicholas' Church	Čoka	Ostojićevo 45.889056°N 20.167228°E	31 March 1966	
SK 2079		Wattle Granary in Kikinda	Kikinda	Kikinda 178 Nemanjina St. 45.821263°N 20.448425°E	20 February 1998	
SK 2080		Old Municipal Authorities Building	Kikinda	Mokrin 45.934438°N 20.409407°E	26 November 1968	
SK 2249		Old brick and tile factory building	Kikinda	Kikinda Danila Kosića 9. 45.812996°N 20.462070°E	6 August 2021	

== Archeological Sites ==
Number in the Central Register	Photo	Name	City / Municipality	Address	Designated since	Classification
AN 116		Gradište Archaeological Site	Kikinda	Iđoš 45.853533°N 20.389926°E	30 December 1950	Great Importance
AN 119		Crkvine Archaeological Site	Kanjiža	Horgoš 46.146008°N 19.909869°E	3 November 1970	Great Importance
AN 132		Siget Anka Archaeological Site	Novi Kneževac	Rabe 46.104886°N 20.246552°E	17 October 1997	
AN 133		Remains of St. George Monastery and Medieval Graveyard	Novi Kneževac	Majdan 46.092078°N 20.271129°E	17 October 1997	

== Historic Landmarks ==
Number in the Central Register	Photo	Name	City / Municipality	Address	Designated since	Classification
—		Site of the Battle of Senta	Senta	Senta Porong 45.926227°N 20.098051°E	^α	Exceptional Importance

^α Site of the Battle of Senta was classified as a Historic Landmark of Exceptional Importance by the National Assembly, although it was never proclaimed a Cultural Heritage at the first place. Thus, it is not inscribed into the Central Register.

== Spatial Cultural-Historical Units ==
Number in the Central Register	Photo	Name	City / Municipality	Address	Designated since	Classification
PKIC 62		Downtown of Kikinda	Kikinda	Kikinda	18 December 2003	
