= Church of the Holy Archangels, Nerodimlje =

Former Serbian Orthodox Church in Gornje Nerodimlje, Kosovo

Church of the Holy Archangels
- Црква светих Архангела (Serbian); Crkva svetih Arhangela (Serbian); Kisha e Kryeengjëjve të Shenjtë (Albanian)
- Location within Kosovo Location within Serbia
- 42.35924398°N 21.07922058°E
- Type: Serbian Orthodox church building
- Location: Nerodime e Epërme/Gornje Nerodimlje, District of Ferizaj/Uroševac, Kosovo

History
- Demolished: Kosovo War

Site notes
- Restored: 1700

Cultural Heritage of Serbia
- Type: Cultural Monument of Exceptional Importance
- Reference no.: SK 1420

The Church of the Holy Archangels (Serbian Cyrillic: Црква светих Архангела; Serbian: Crkva svetih Arhangela; Albanian: Kisha e Kryeengjëjve të Shenjtë) is a former 14th-century Serbian Orthodox church in Gornje Nerodimlje near the city of Uroševac, Kosovo. It is listed as a Cultural Monument of Exceptional Importance of the Republic of Serbia. It was destroyed by Albanians during the Kosovo War.

== Description ==
The church was built in the 14th century and restored in 1700. It had a single nave with a narthex. The western façade had two rectangular windows. The façades and the porches were whitened by lime. Under the 18th-century frescoes, there were several paintings from the 14th and 15th centuries. The building also hosted icons from the 17th and 18th centuries. The Pine of Tsar Dušan, a black pine tree planted by Emperor Dušan, was located near the church.

== See also ==
- Cultural monuments of the Kosovo district
