= Obornjača =

Obornjača may refer to:

- Obornjača (Ada), a village in the Ada municipality, Serbia
- Obornjača (Bačka Topola), a village in the Bačka Topola municipality, Serbia
