= Immovable Cultural Heritage in the Prizren District =

This list includes Immovable Cultural Heritage sites (listed by the Institute for the Protection of Cultural Monuments of Serbia) in the Prizren District of Serbia – which only partly overlaps with the District of Prizren of Kosovo. (Note: In 2000, the United Nations Interim Administration Mission in Kosovo implemented a redistricting of Kosovo.)

== Cultural monuments ==
=== Exceptional importance ===
Number in the Central Register	Picture	Name	City/Municipality	Location address	designated cultural heritage	Exceptional importance since	Comment
SK 1366		Holy Archangels' Monastery	Prizren	Jablanica	30 March 1948	4 June 1990	Looted and devastated in June–July 1999 by the Albanians, the 14th century Pine of Tsar Dušan was cut down and burned.
SK 1369		Bogorodica Ljeviška	Prizren	Prizren; Kralja Milutina St. no. 40	11 March 1948	4 June 1990	World Heritage Site. Burned and desecrated by Albanians in 2004.
SK 1394		Serbian Orthodox Church of St. Nicholas	Orahovac	Velika Hoča	16 April 1958	3 December 1990	
SK 1395		Serbian Orthodox Church of St. John the Baptist	Orahovac	Velika Hoča	16 April 1958	3 December 1990	
SK 1399		Kaljaja Fortress	Prizren	Prizren	24 September 1948	3 December 1990	
SK 1400		Hermitage of St. Peter of Koriša	Prizren	Kabaš near Koriša	16 December 1950	3 December 1990	
SK 1401		Church of Holy Salvation	Prizren	Prizren; Šumadijske Divizije St. nn	27. 09.1948	3 December 1990	Destroyed by Albanians during 2004 unrest
SK 1402		Church of St. Nicholas	Prizren	Prizren; Miladina Popovića St. no. 3	29 May 1962	3 December 1990	Heavily damaged by Albanians in 1999, and again in 2004, later renovated.
SK 1404		Church of the Holy Virgin in Sredska	Prizren	Sredska; Pejčići	16 December 1950	3 December 1990 (cluster "Churches of Sredačka Župa")	
SK 1403		St. George's Church in Sredska	Prizren	Sredska; Milačići	20 December 1956	3 December 1990 (cluster "Churches of Sredačka Župa")	
SK 1405		St. Nicholas' Church	Prizren	Mušnikovo	20 December 1956	3 December 1990 (cluster "Churches of Sredačka Župa")	
SK 1406		St. Parascheva (St. Peter and Paul's) Church	Prizren	Mušnikovo	20 December 1956	3 December 1990 (cluster "Churches of Sredačka Župa")	
SK 1407		St. Nicholas' Church	Prizren	Bogoševce	20 December 1956	3 December 1990 (cluster "Churches of Sredačka Župa")	
SK 1408		St. George's Church	Prizren	Gornje Selo	16 April 1958	3 December 1990 (cluster "Churches of Sredačka Župa")	
SK 1409		St. Nicholas' Church	Prizren	Drajčići	16 April 1958	3 December 1990 (cluster "Churches of Sredačka Župa")	
SK 1410		Sinan Pasha's Mosque	Prizren	Prizren; Sime Igumanova St. nn	27 September 1948	3 December 1990	
SK 1411		Old Hamam	Prizren	Prizren; Kralja Petra I Oslobodioca St. nn	18. 09.1954	3 December 1990	
SK 1414		The church of the Holy Virgin Hodegetria	Suva Reka	Mušutište	27 November 1948	3 December 1990	Completely destroyed by the Albanians in 1999.
SK 1415		Saint George Church	Suva Reka	Rečane	11 September 1953	3 December 1990	The church was demolished by the Albanians in 1999.

== See also ==
- Immovable Cultural Heritage of Exceptional Importance (Serbia)
- Immovable Cultural Heritage of Great Importance (Serbia)
- Monuments of Kosovo
