= Donja Orovica =

Donja Orovica Доња Оровица (Serbian)
- Village (Selo)
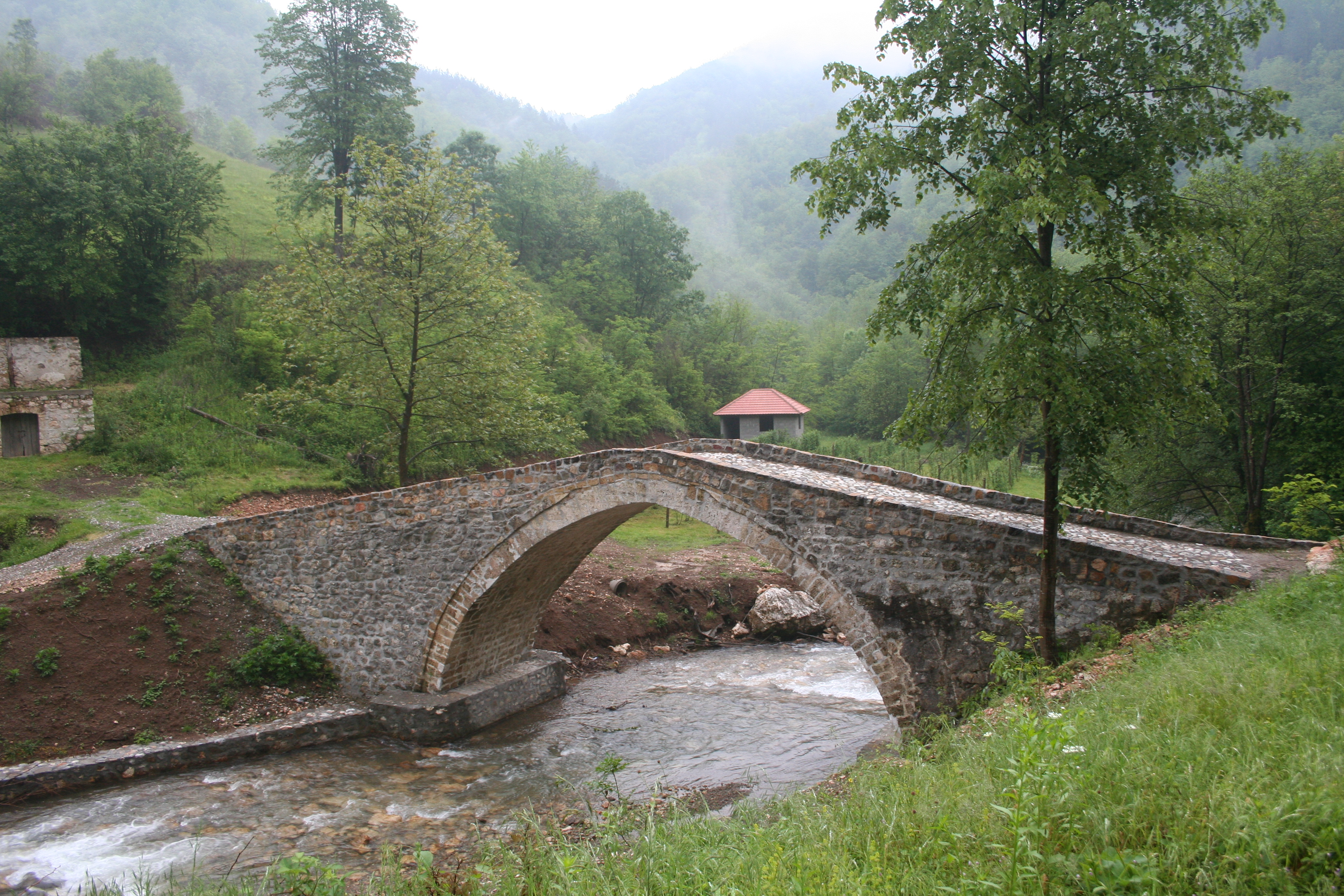
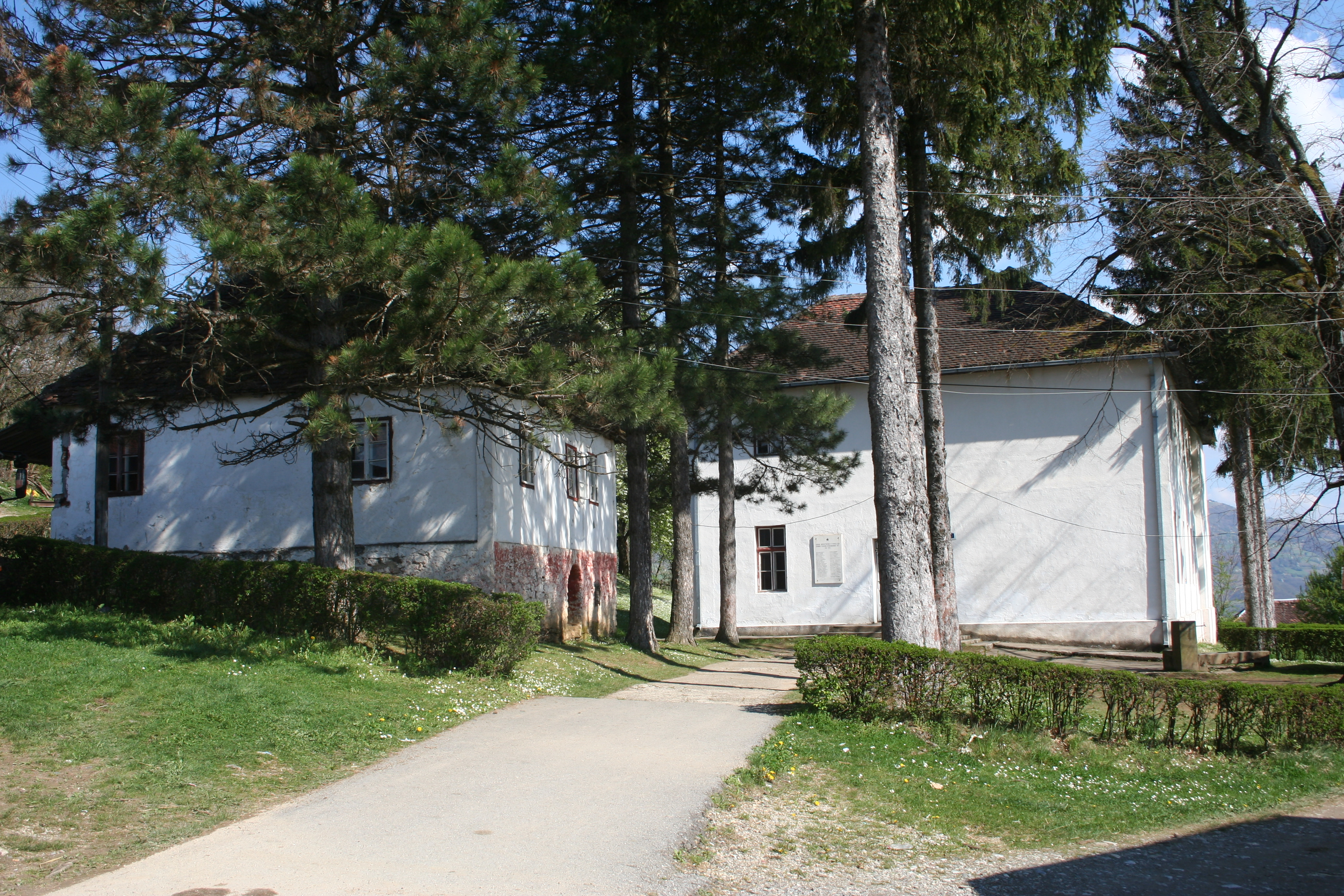
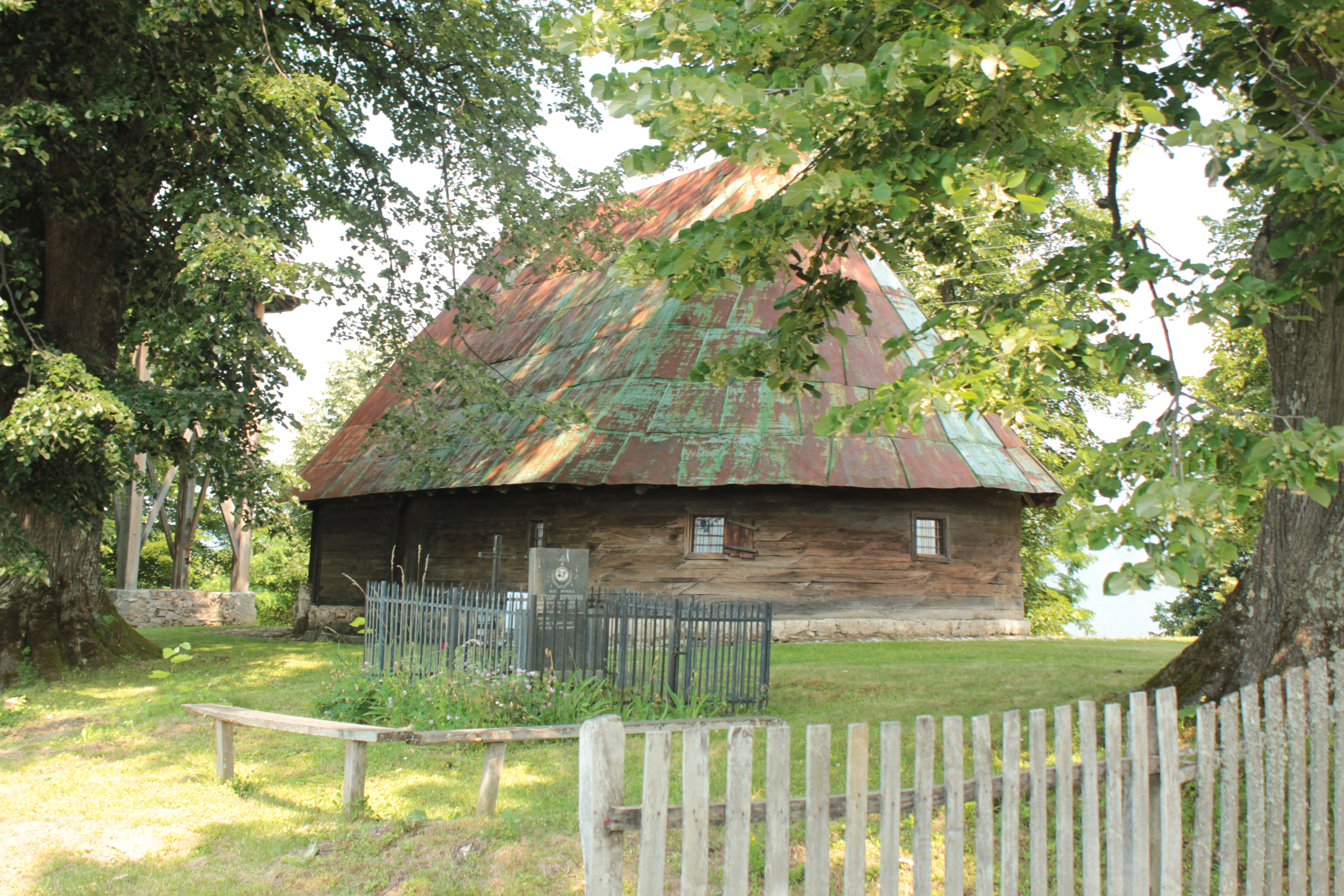

- Location within Serbia
- Coordinates: 44°13′N 19°29′E
- Country: Serbia
- Municipality: Ljubovija
- Time zone: UTC+1 (CET)
  - Summer (DST): UTC+2 (CEST)

Donja Orovica (Serbian Cyrillic: Доња Оровица) is a village in Serbia. It is situated in the Ljubovija municipality, in the Mačva District of Central Serbia. The village had a Serb ethnic majority and a population of 424 in 2002.

The Wooden church of the Holy Apostles is a Serbian Orthodox church in the village, which is designated in the list of cultural heritage of Serbia (SK 580).

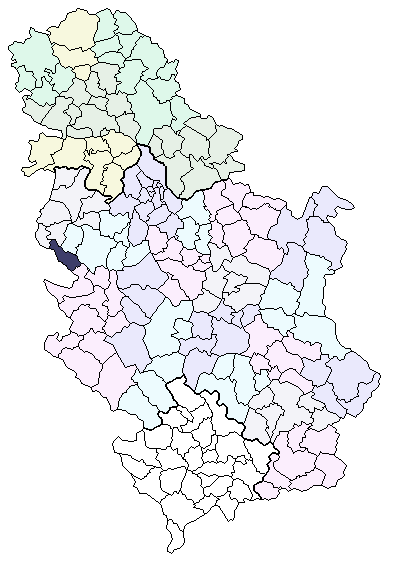
Location of the Ljubovija municipality in Serbia

== Historical population ==
- 1948: 963
- 1953: 1,019
- 1961: 959
- 1971: 797
- 1981: 682
- 1991: 554
- 2002: 424

== See also ==
- List of places in Serbia
