= Utrine =

Utrine is a name of several places. It may refer to:

- Utrine, Zagreb, a large residential neighborhood in Zagreb
- Utrine (Ada), a village in Serbia
