= Wooden church of the Holy Apostles at Donja Orovica =

Wooden church of the Holy Apostles in Donja Orovica
- Црква брвнара Светих Апостола у Доњој Оровици; Crkva brvnara Svetih Apostola u Donjoj Orovici
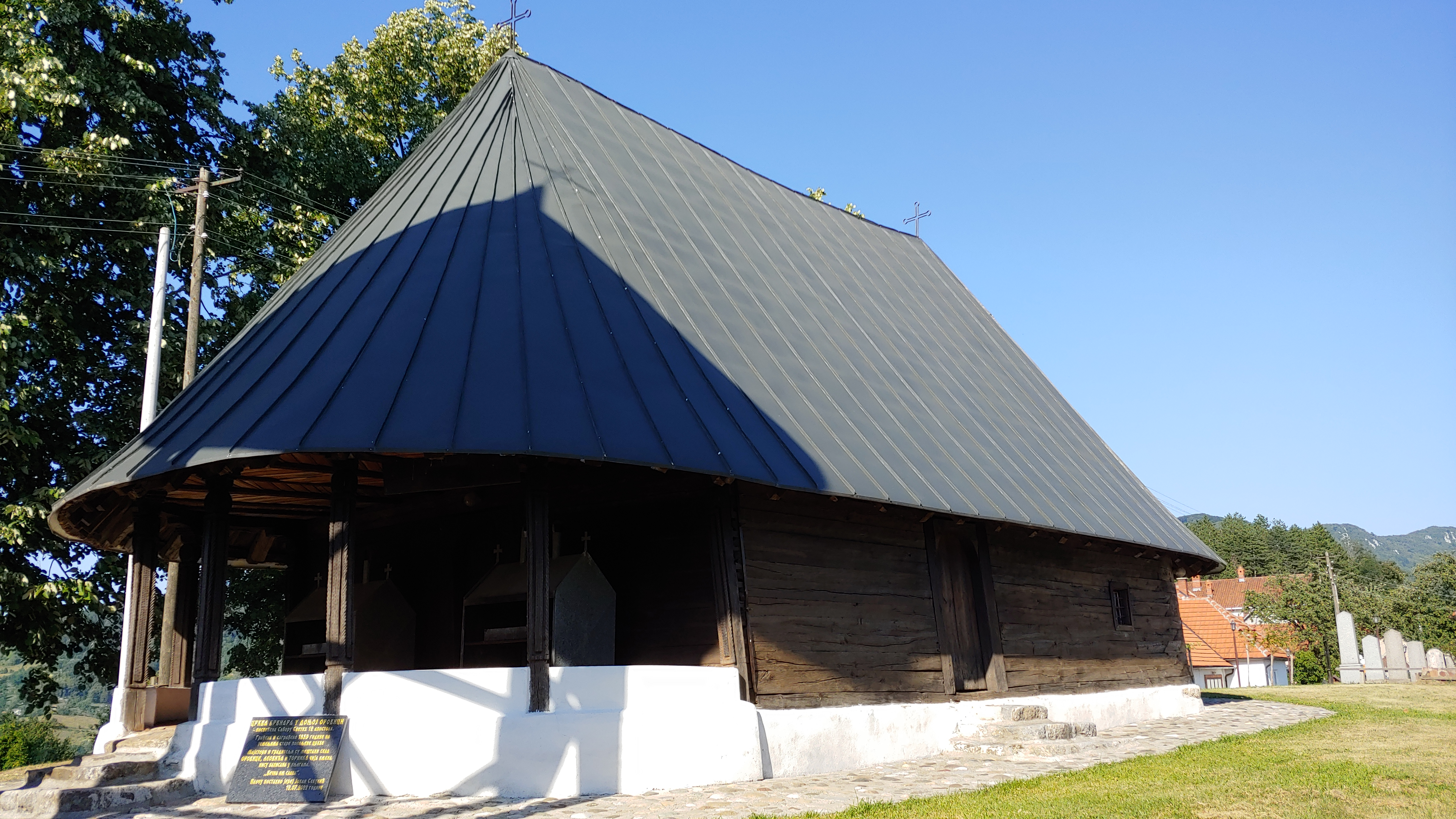
- View of the Wooden church in Donja Orovica
- Wooden church of the Holy Apostles in Donja Orovica
- 44.2220°N 19.4851°E
- Location: Donja Orovica, Ljubovija
- Country: Serbia
- Denomination: Serbian Orthodox
- Tradition: Eastern Orthodox

History
- Status: Parish church

Architecture
- Functional status: active
- Heritage designation: Immovable cultural property, SK 580
- Years built: 1839-1840

Specifications
- Length: 15.50 m (50.9 ft)
- Width: 6.30 m (20.7 ft)
- Materials: wood, sheet metal

Administration
- District: Eparchy of Šabac

The Wooden church of the Holy Apostles in Donja Orovica (in Serbian Cyrillic: Црква брвнара Светих Апостола у Доњој Оровици, in Latin Serbian: Crkva brvnara Svetih Apostola u Donjoj Orovici) is a Serbian Orthodox church in Donja Orovica, in the district of Mačva and in the municipality of Ljubovija in Serbia. It is inscribed in the list of cultural heritage of the Republic of Serbia (SK 580).

== Description ==
The church is in the region of Azbukovica, at the foot of mount Medvedik. It has been built from 1839 until 1840, replacing an older church that had been destroyed by the Ottomans in 1813. The new building has been made possible mainly by the efforts by the villagers.

The church consists of a single nave that is extended by a semi-circular apse on the east side and an semi-circular porch on the west side. It is 15.50 m (50.9 ft) long and 6.30 m (20.7 ft) wide. The structure is built out of oak logs. The porch is held by eight sculpted wooden columns. The roof, which follows the semi-circular form of the buildings terminations in the west and east, is covered by wood shingles, which are today themselves covered by sheet metal.

To the west of the building, on a stone base, is the detached, wooden bell tower with a single bell that is swung by a cord.

== Gallery ==
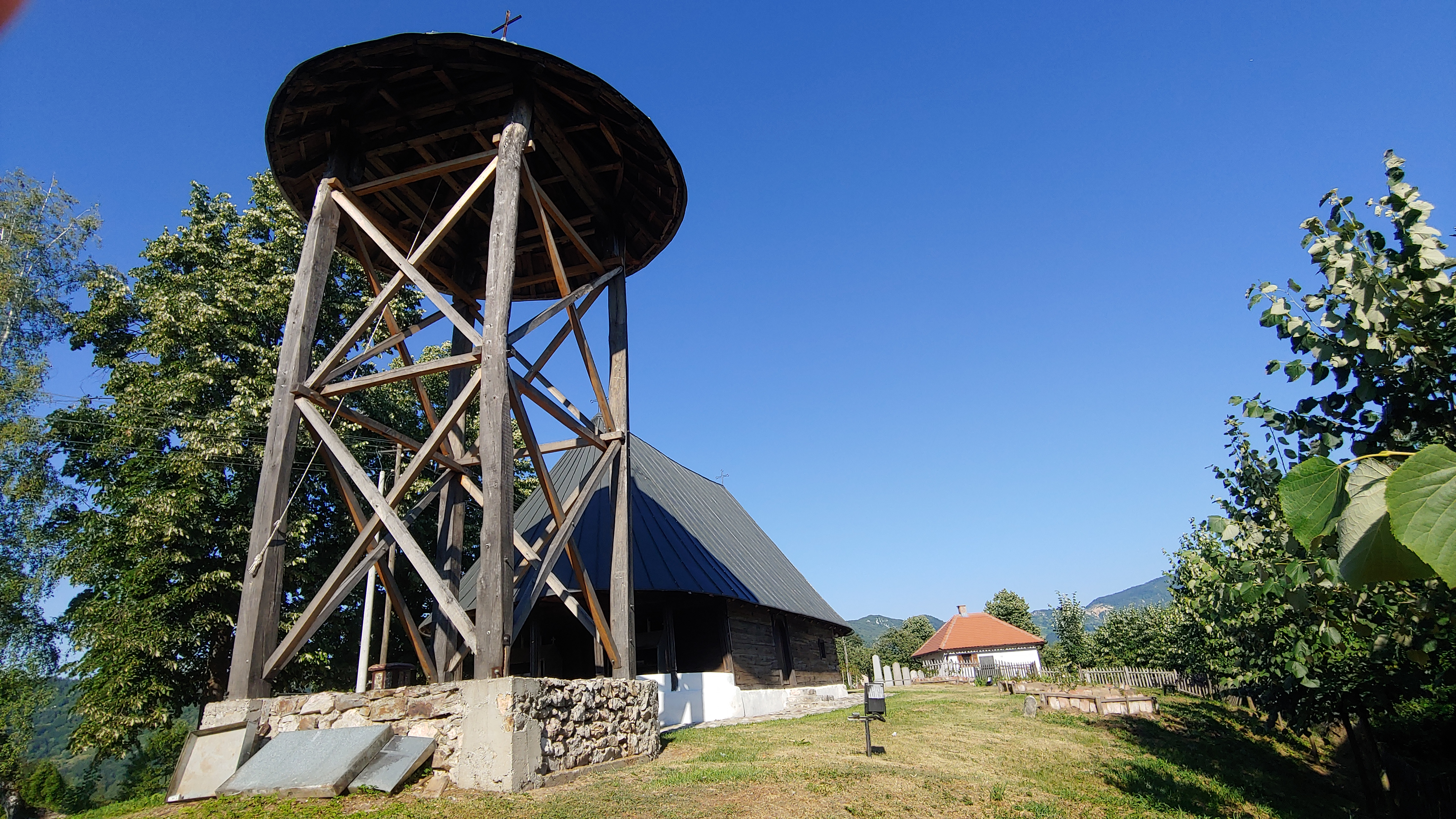
View from the west

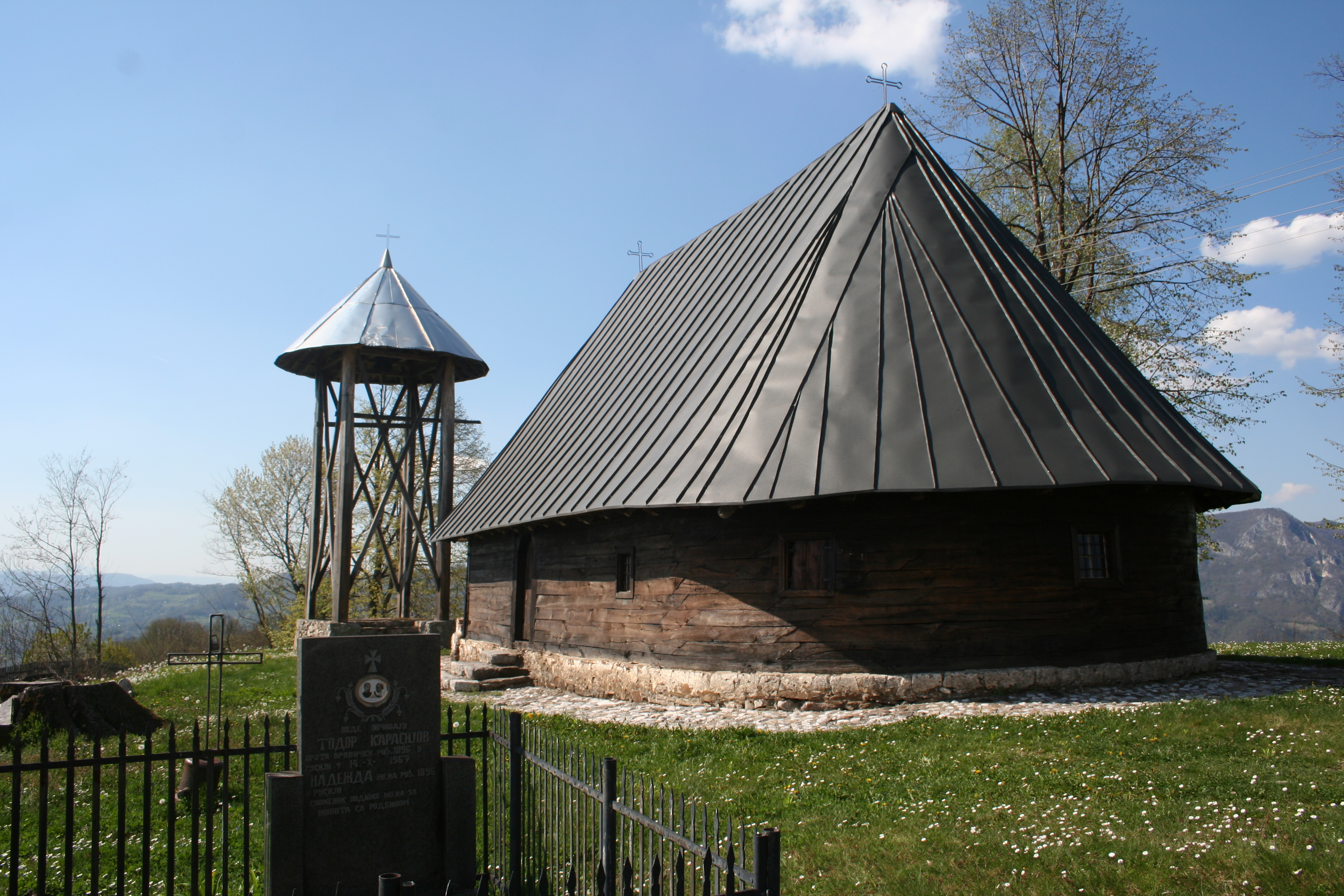
View from the east

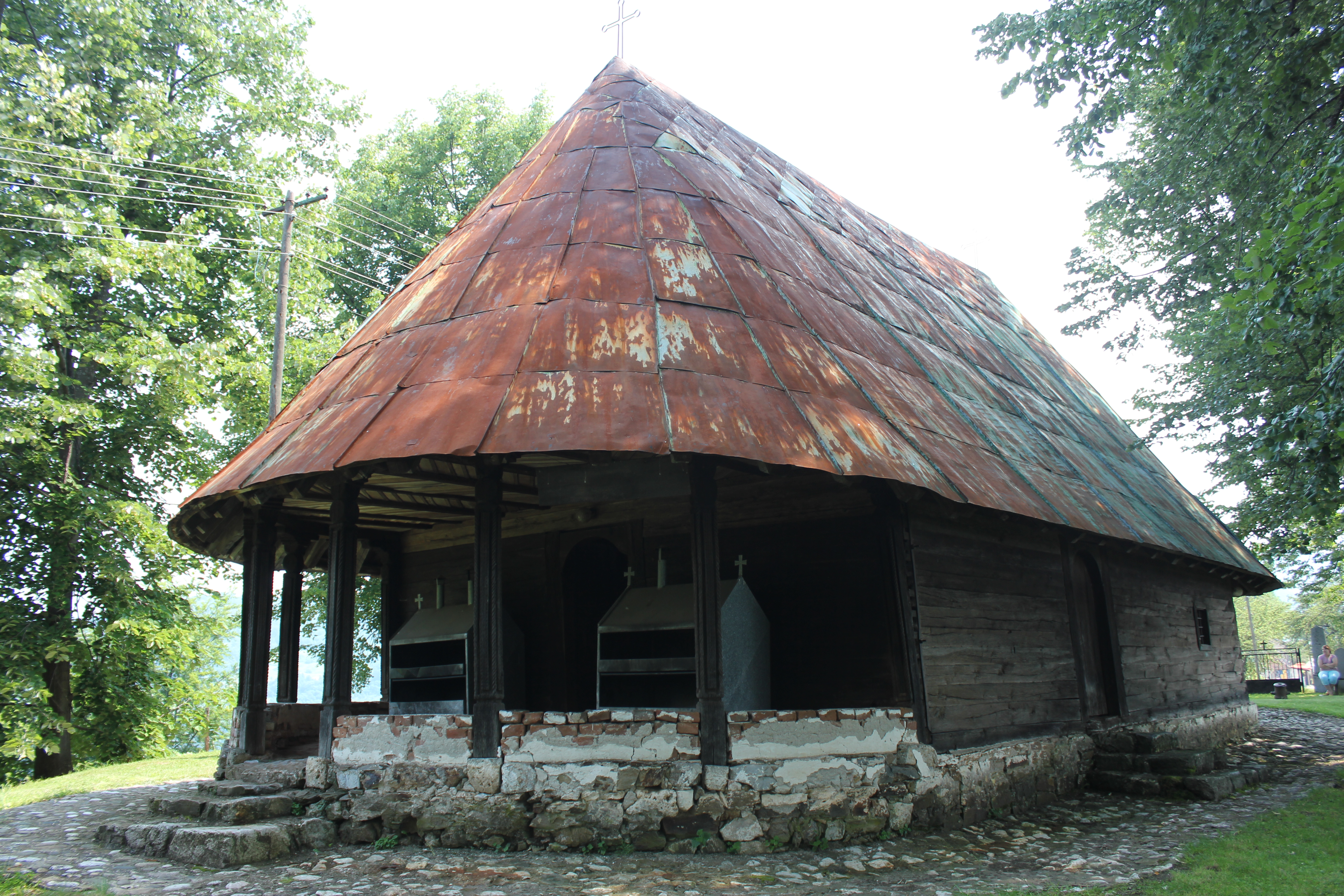
State of the roof before renovation
