= Obornjača (Bačka Topola) =

Obornjača Оборњача (Serbian)
- Village (Selo)
- Location within Vojvodina Location within Serbia Location within Europe
- Coordinates: 45°46′19″N 19°52′11″E
- Country: Serbia
- Province: Vojvodina
- District: North Bačka District
- Municipality: Bačka Topola
- Time zone: UTC+1 (CET)
  - Summer (DST): UTC+2 (CEST)

Obornjača (Serbian Cyrillic: Оборњача) is an uninhabited village in Serbia. It is situated in the Bačka Topola municipality, in the North Bačka District, Vojvodina province.

== Name ==
In Serbian the settlement is known as Obornjača (Оборњача) and in Hungarian as Nagyvölgy. There is a nearby settlement with the same name, but it administratively belongs to the neighbouring municipality of Ada (See: Obornjača (Ada)).

== History ==
In 1975, the village had about 40 houses and 220 inhabitants. According to 2002 census, the population of the village numbered only 2 inhabitants, both of them ethnic Hungarians. According to 2011 census, the village was uninhabited.

== See also ==
- List of places in Serbia
- List of cities, towns and villages in Vojvodina
