= Church of Saint Nicholas, Szeged =

Serbian Orthodox church in Szeged, Hungary

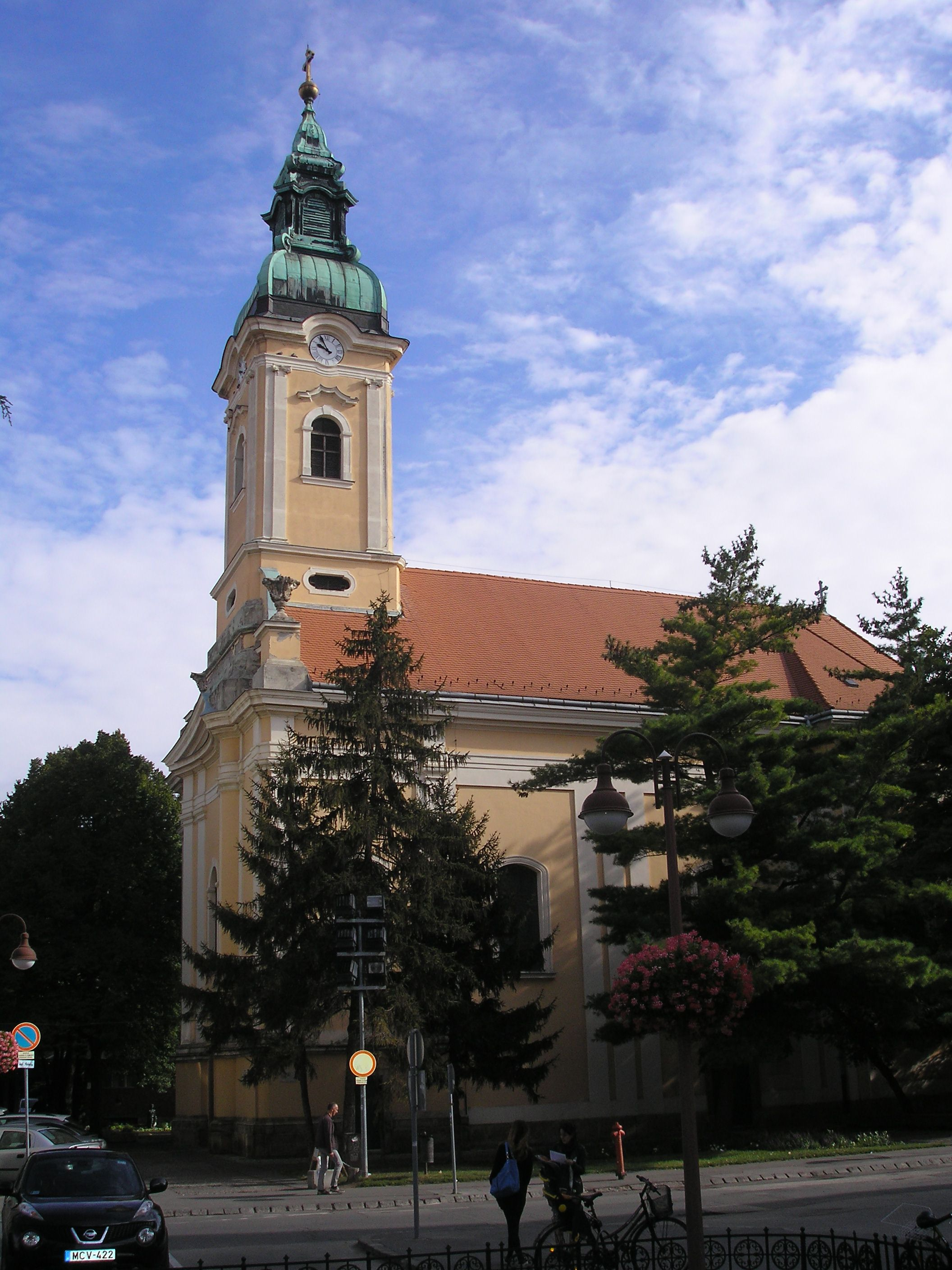
- Church of Saint Nicholas, Szeged
- 46°14′57″N 20°8′59″E
- Location: Szeged
- Country: Hungary
- Denomination: Serbian Orthodox Church

History
- Status: Active
- Consecrated: 1805

Architecture
- Functional status: Parish Church
- Architect: Jovan Dobić
- Style: Baroque, copf, Classicism
- Groundbreaking: 1773
- Completed: 1781

Administration
- Diocese: Eparchy of Buda
- Parish: Szeged

Clergy
- Bishop: Lukijan Pantelić
- Priest: Dalibor Milenković

The Church of Saint Nicholas (Serbian: Црква светог Николе, romanized: Crkva svetog Nikole, Hungarian: Szent Miklós templom), also known as the Serbian Church, is an Eastern Orthodox church located in Szeged, Hungary. It is under jurisdiction of the Eparchy of Buda of the Serbian Orthodox Church.

== History ==
Many Serbs moved to Szeged in the centuries after the Battle of Kosovo. After the restoration of the Serbian Patriarchate of Peć in 1557, Szeged became the county town of the Eparchy of Bačka. A wooden Serbian church was built in the city at the beginning of the 16th century, but was destroyed by fire when the Turkish army was expelled.

After the liberation of Szeged from the Ottoman Empire in 1686, Serbs moved to the region in greater numbers. In Szeged, they mostly lived in the Palánk and Upper Town areas. A draft of Csongrád County from 1720 shows that out of 404 buildings, 40 were in Serbian possession. The city's second Serbian Orthodox church, dedicated to Saint Nicholas, was built from stone in the Palánk in 1690. It stood for only 25 years before it was demolished in 1715 to rebuild the city's castle.

The third Orthodox church, a small structure, was built in 1725 at the site of the contemporary church. The fourth, dedicated to the archangels Gabriel and Michael, stood in the Upper Town. Its deed of foundation is from 1727, but it is more likely that it was built during the Turkish occupation or after the liberation of Szeged. It was attended by Greeks as well as Serbs, and remained in regular use until 1848. After that, community members began to join the present-day Church of St. Nicholas instead. The previous church was heavily damaged in a flood in 1879 and was soon destroyed.

The fifth church, today's Church of St. Nicholas, was built rapidly near the site of the third one, behind Votive Church in Dóm Square. The building was designed by Jovan Dobić, and two German masters from Pest, a tinsmith and a carpenter, built the tower. A painter from Buda, Mihailo Sokolović, decorated it with gold and paintings.

Bishop Arsenije Radojević of Szeged, Novi Sad and Eger gave his blessing for the church in 1775, but it is not known exactly when the builders got permission to begin construction. The base was consecrated on 11 July 1778, and a lead tablet recording this event was built into the basement of the church, with a paper copy filed in the church's historical archive. The nave was completed in 1780, and the tower in 1781; during the building of the tower, another lead plaque was built into the church, also with a paper copy for the archive. The five bells were consecrated in 1781. The interior took longer to finish, and it was not until 1805 that Bishop Jovan Jovanović sanctified the church.

== Iconostasis ==
The iconostasis, which divides the altar from the nave, is the most ornate part of the church. Designed in the rococo style, it consists of 74 icons. The upper part was made by unknown artists. The lower part was originally made for Szeged's third church by Jovan Popović, a Serbian Baroque artist, as recorded in a contract from 7 June 1761. The numbers "1761" are also written on the icon depicting the Temptation of Christ.

The two side doors in the iconostasis, called the Deacon's Doors, are for those who help in the liturgy. The left (northern) door depicts Moses, and the right (southern) door shows his brother, Aaron. Above Moses, there is a depiction of Melchizedek's sacrifice; above Aaron is a depiction of Abraham's sacrifice.

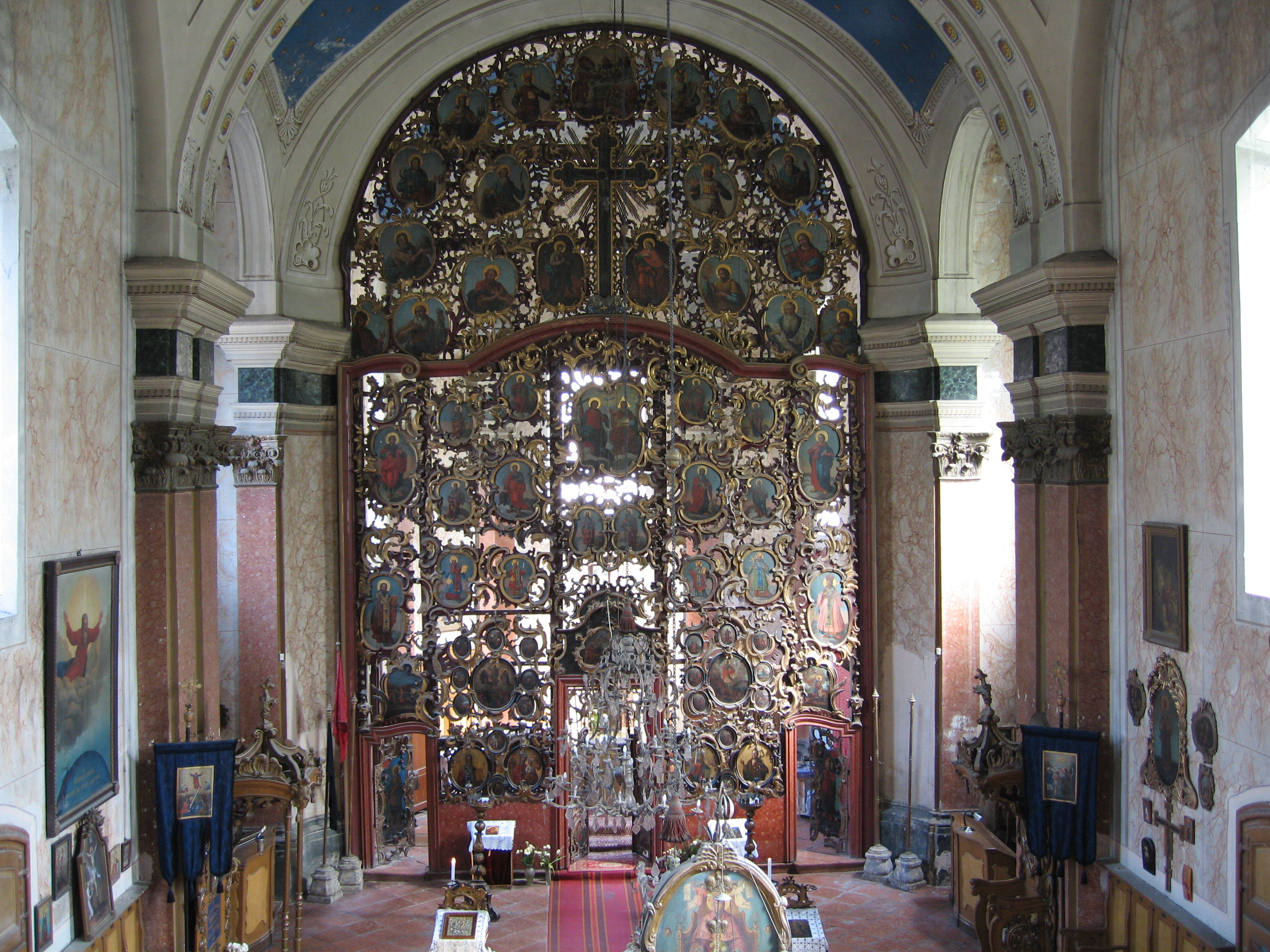
The rococo iconostasis.

At the center is the King's Door, used by the priests. At the top, Gabriel is shown with a lily in his hands, next to the Virgin Mary. This is a depiction of the Annunciation, in which Gabriel informed Mary that she would give birth to Jesus. Below are the Four Evangelists: Matthew with an angel, John with a hawk, Luke with a bull and Mark with a lion. A snake, symbolizing the bronze snake from the Bible, is depicted climbing up the door. Above the door, an eye in a triangle represents the eye of God.

To the right (south) of the King's Door is an icon of Jesus Christ, and to the left is one of the Virgin Mary and the baby Jesus. Next to the icon of Jesus Christ is one of John the Baptist, and next to the Virgin Mary's icon is one of Saint Nicholas, the patron of the church. It is usual for these four icons, known as the throne icons, to be the most decorated in Orthodox churches. Hanging in front of the throne icons are four lanterns from Mount Athos and from Russia, decorated with the images of the crucified Jesus, Saint George and detailed plant motifs. The Last Supper is depicted above the King's Door. At the bottom, between the throne icons, there are two smaller icons: the Flight into Egypt between Saint Nicholas and the Virgin Mary, and the Temptation of Christ between Jesus and John the Baptist.

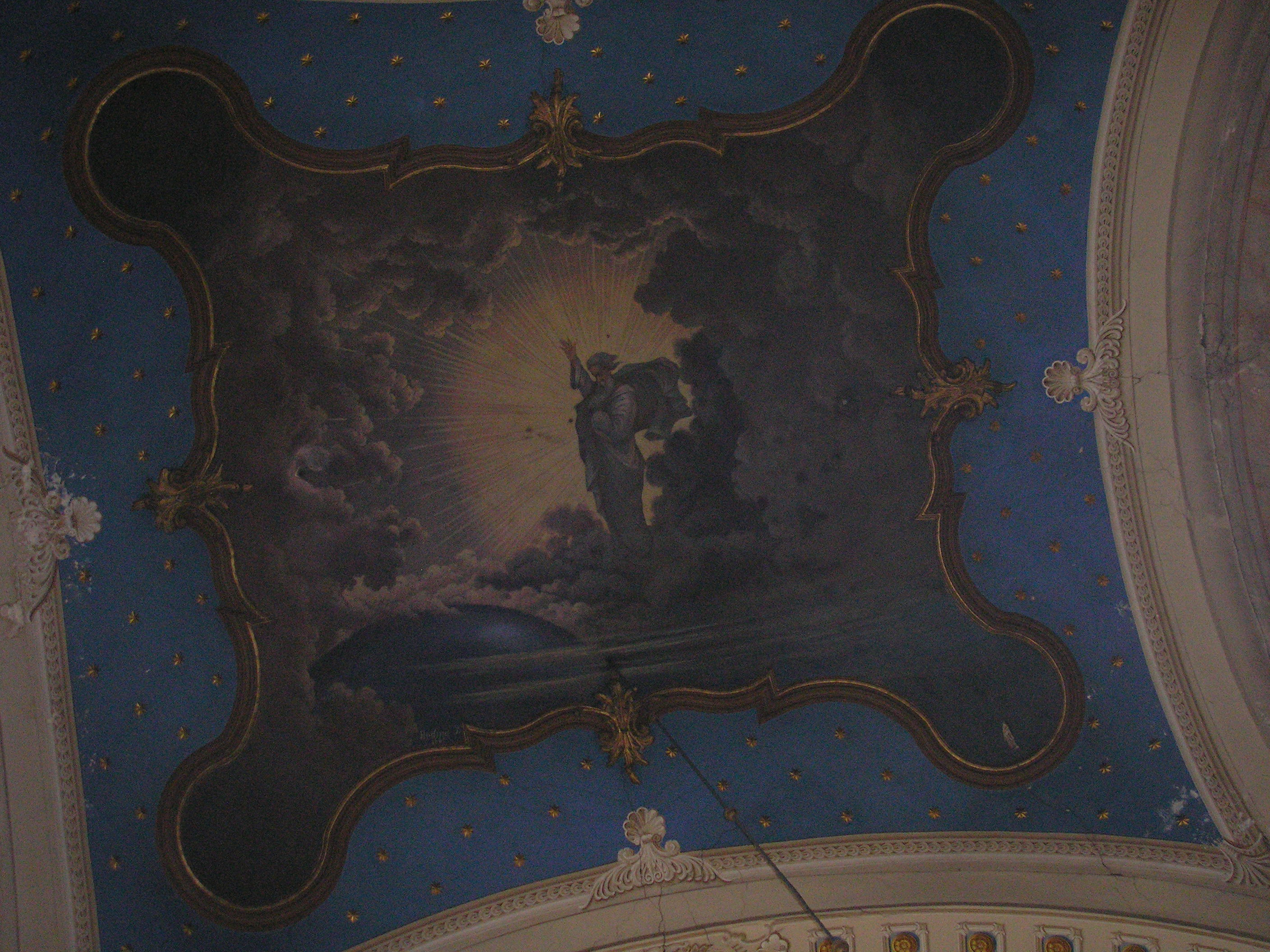
The fresco of the creation of the world.

The holiday icons—one large icon surrounded by eight smaller ones—are above the throne icons. The Transfiguration of Jesus is on the left (north) side. Around it, moving counterclockwise, are icons showing the Epiphany, Palm Sunday (Jesus' triumphal entry into Jerusalem), the Presentation of Jesus at the Temple, the Annunciation, the birth of John the Baptist, the Circumcision of Christ, the Dormition of the Mother of God, and the Presentation of Mary at the Temple. The Resurrection of Jesus is depicted on the right (south) side, and counterclockwise around it are the Birth of Christ, the beheading of John the Baptist, the protection of the Virgin Mary, the stoning of Saint Stephen, the resurrection of Lazarus of Bethany, the Pentecost and the Visitation.

The Father, the Son and the Holy Spirit, illustrated as a dove, are painted below the red frame, and the Evangelists are depicted in red and blue around them. Other icons show the Apostles and the Church Fathers. In the lunette above the red stave is a crucifix; on the left, the Virgin Mary and John the Apostle can be seen at Jesus' feet. The rest of the icons depict the prophets from the Old Testament, and at the top of the wall, the Last Judgment is painted.

The church sustained heavy damage in the flood of 1879, and was renovated from 1880 to 1881. During the renovation, the little-known Slovak artist Jan Hodina painted a fresco on the ceiling depicting the creation of the world.

== List of priests ==
Period	Name
1690–92	Kuzma
1692–1714	Neško
1714–24	Mojsije
1724–27	Božidar Lazarević
1727–33	Georgije Radosavljević and Arsenije Vasilijević
1734–44	Arsenije Živković
1741–59	Jovan Slivinski
1742–73	Jovan Popović
1760-70	Teodor Veselinović
1770-10	Mihail Živanović
1781–91	Jovan Ostoić
1785–1825	Prokopije Radulović
1794–96	Mihail Krekić, deacon
1810–	Evtimije Gojković, paroch of Martonoš
1810-	Simeon Sarailić, monk, priest
1811-1812	Atanasije Vlahović
1812-	Vasilije Vukailović, chaplain
1814–1829	Dimitrije Dimitrijević
1823-1830	Grigorije Kovačić
1830–1833	Grigorije Popović
1833–34	Aron Krestić
1834–44	Pavle Stamatović
1844–70	Aleksandar Vuković
1868–83	Isidor Zubanović
1875–76	Isaija Maoduš, monk, priest of Privina Glava
1883–84	Gervasij Teodorović, monk, priest
1883–84	Petar Petrović, paroch of Martonoš
1884–96	Đura Jevrić
1896–23	Lazar Šević
1923–36	Stevan Đurđević
1936–48	Milan Grunčić
1948–84	Živan Nikolašev
1984–2007	Branislav Galić
2007–2018	Pavle Kaplan/Káplán Pál
2018–present	Dalibor Milenković

== Image gallery ==
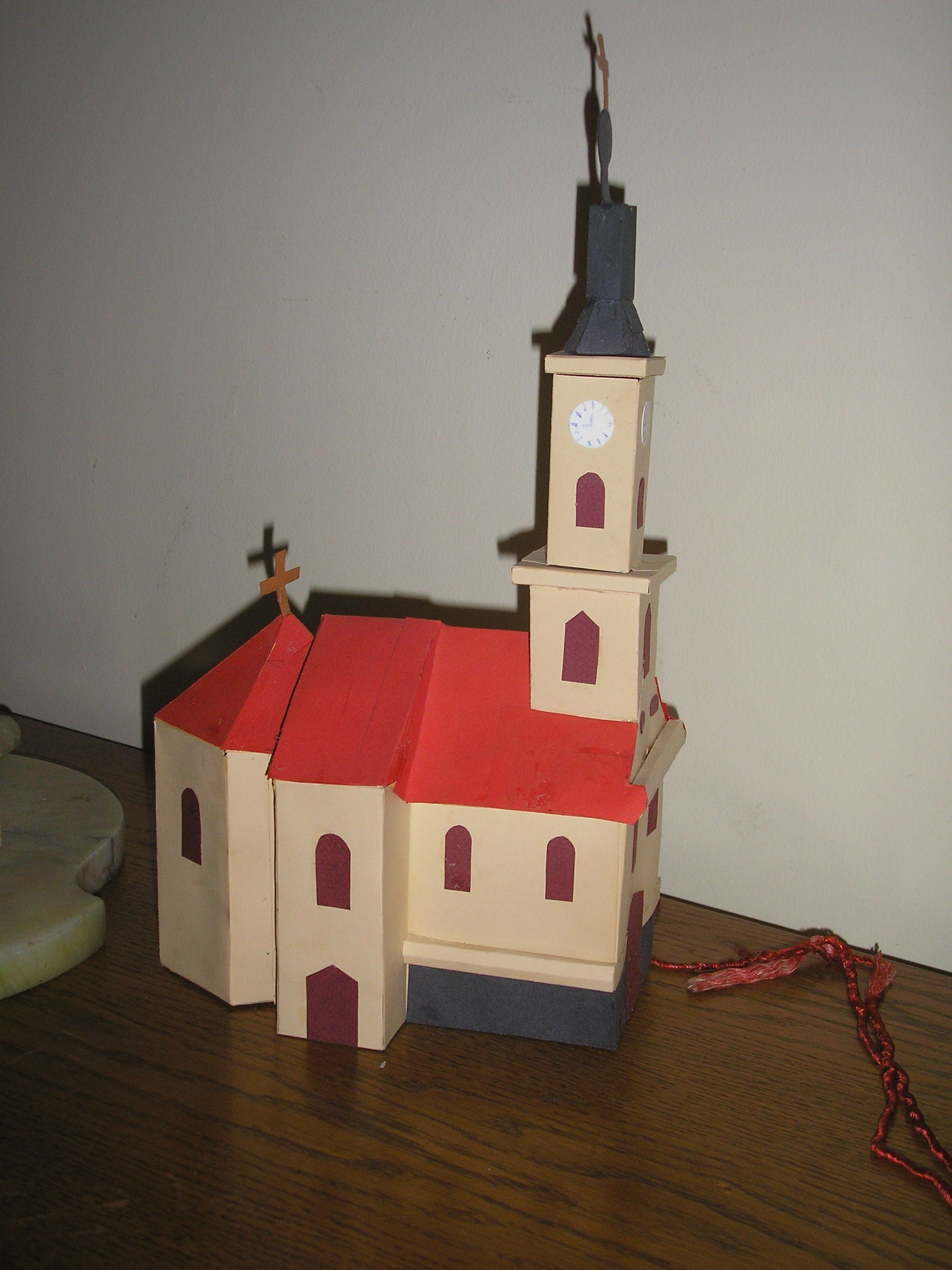
Scale model of the church made by László Kasza, displayed in the Serbian Club

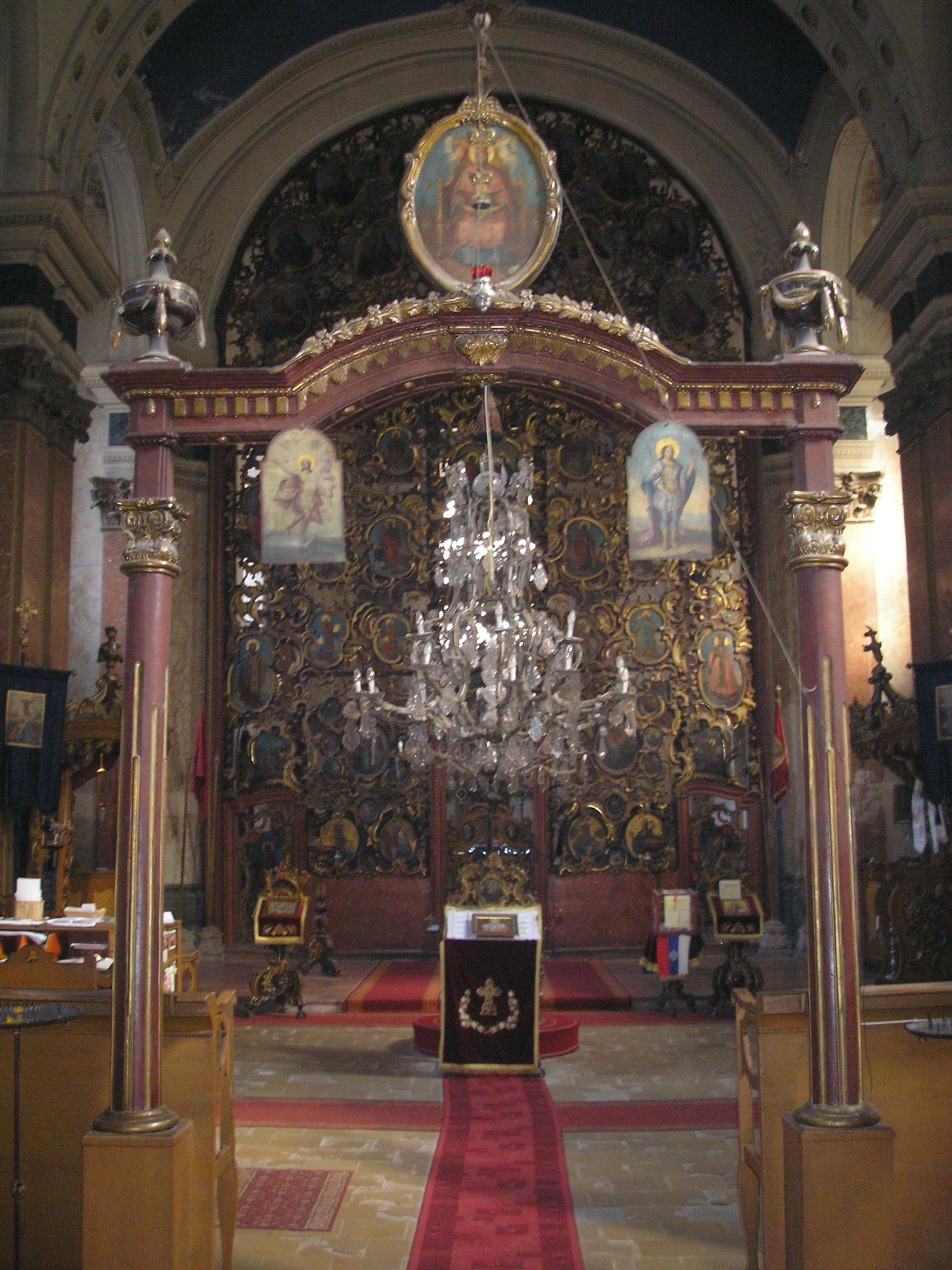
The interior of the church

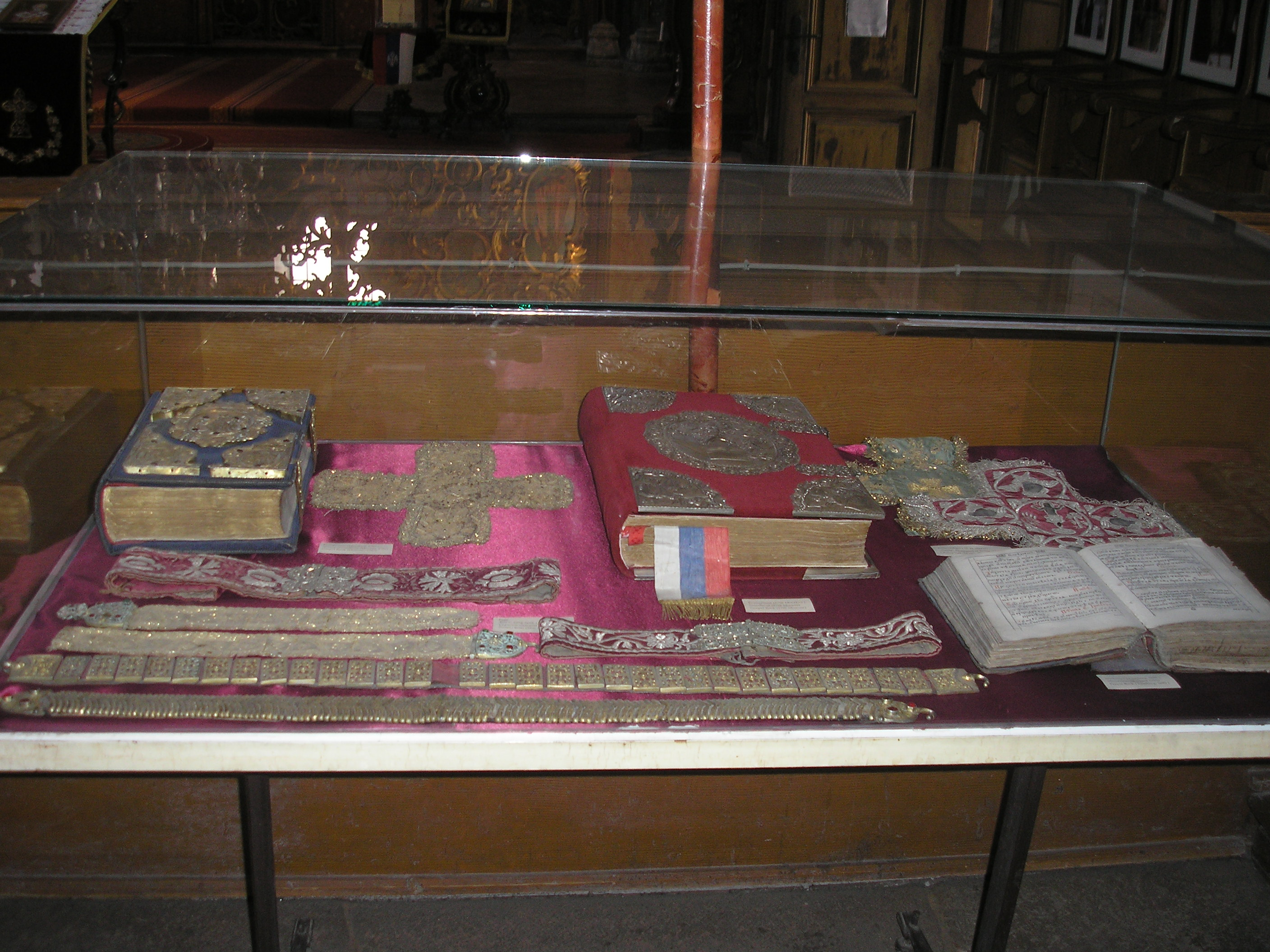
Artwork in the church

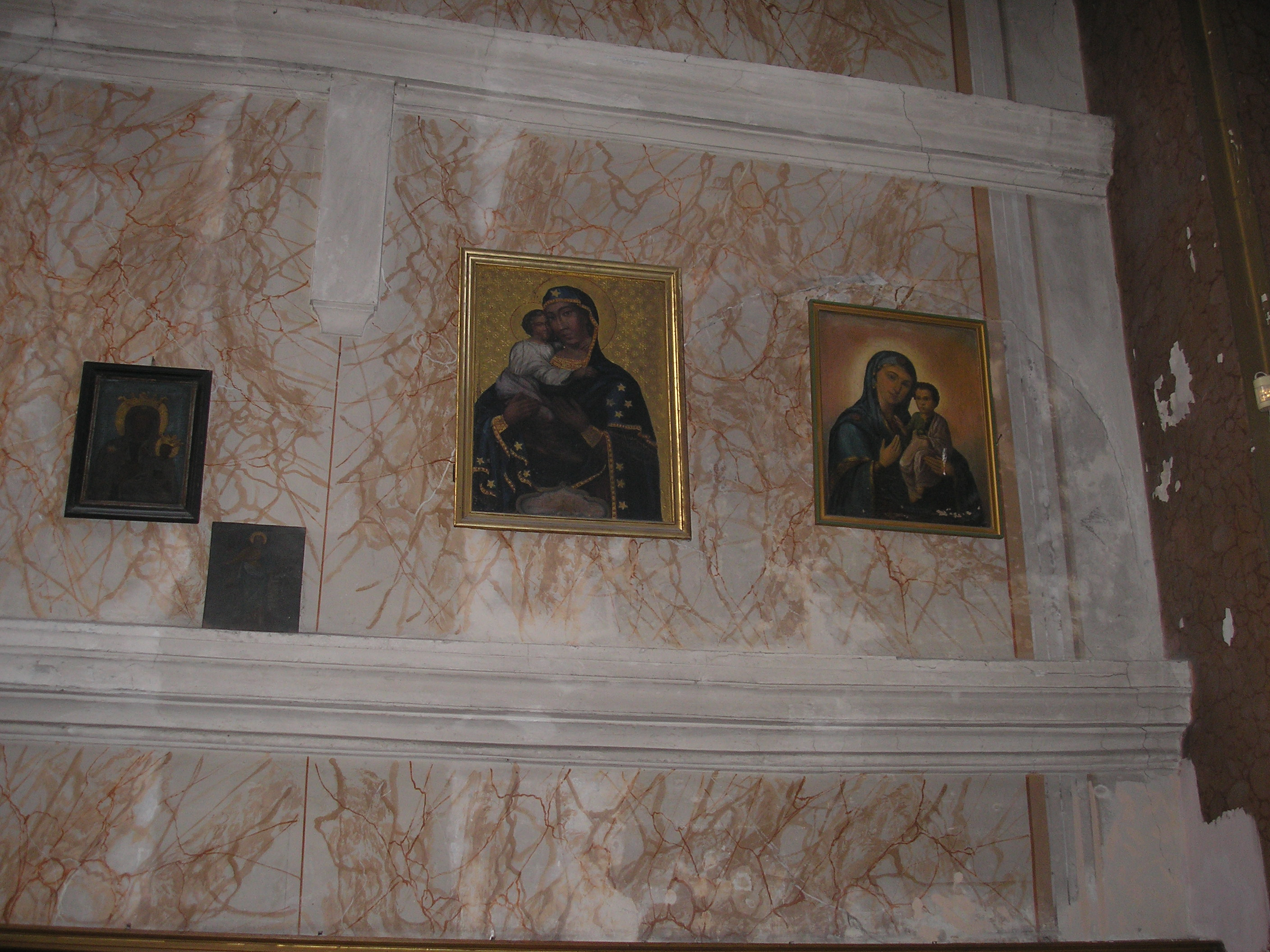
Icons in the church

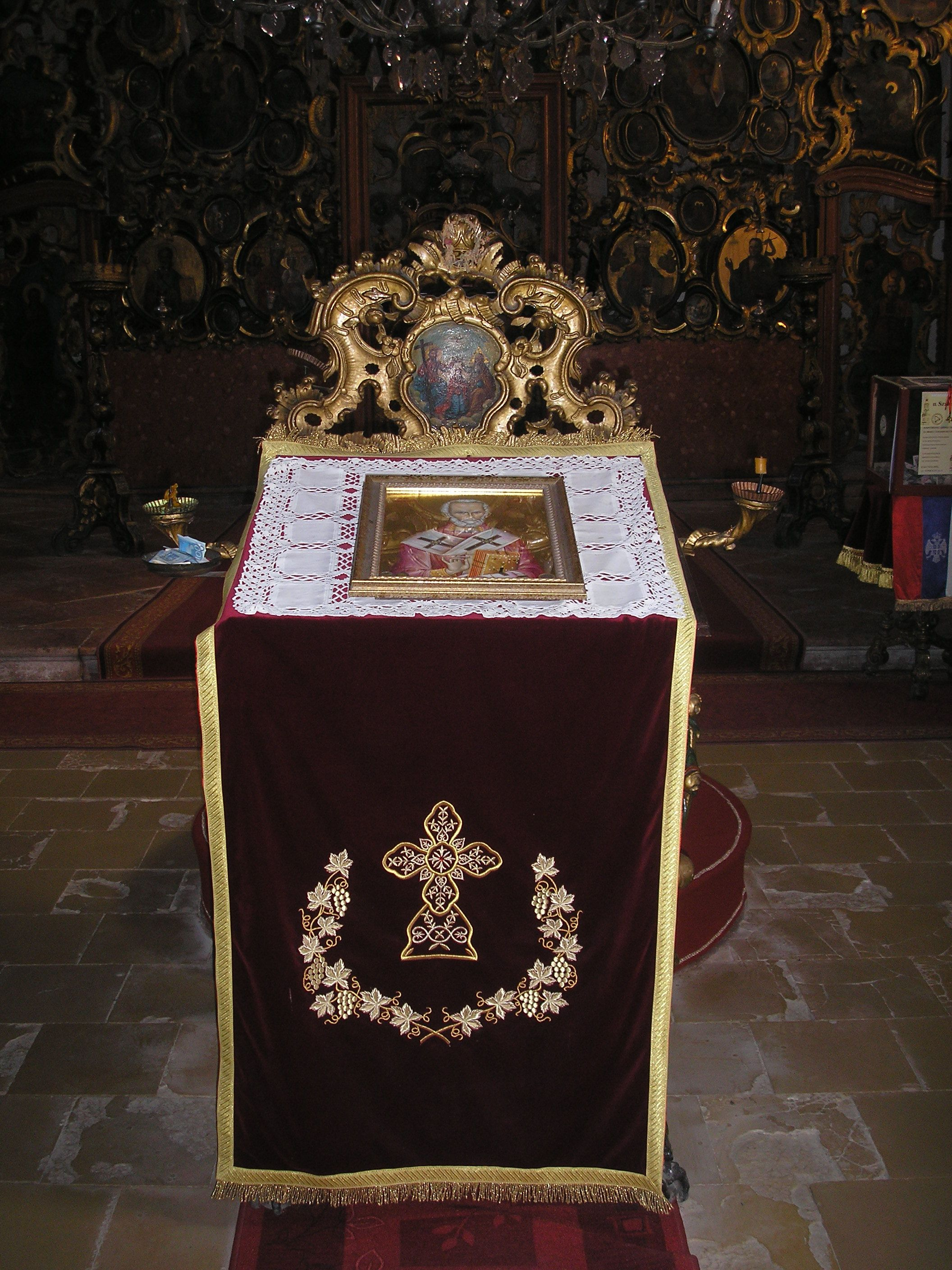
The icon of Saint Nicholas

== See also ==
- Eparchy of Buda
- Serbs of Hungary
