= Törökfalu =

Törökfalu is the Hungarian name for two places:

- Buciumi village, Şomcuta Mare town, Maramureș County, Romania
- Utrine, Serbia
