= Petrič Fortress =

Military complex

Coordinates: 42.3585°N 21.0689°E

Petrič
- Петрич; Pjetriqi
- Petrč
- Interactive map of Petrič
- Satellite of: Nerodimlje (court of the King of Serbia)

History
- Built: end of the 13th century
- Built by: King Milutin

Site notes
- Material: large stones and lime mortar

Cultural Heritage of Serbia
- Official name: Ostaci srednjovekovnih gradova Malog i Velikog Petriča
- Type: Cultural monument of Exceptional Importance
- Designated: 31 December 1967
- Reference no.: SK 1418

Petrič (Serbian: Petrič, Петрич) or Petrč or Petrić (Albanian: Pjetriqi) was a strategic military complex consisting of two late medieval fortresses in Nerodimlje Župa of the Kingdom of Serbia. The role of the main fortress Veliki Petrič (or Velika Kaleja) and a smaller fortress Mali Petrič (or Mala Kaleja) was to protect the court of the King of Serbia in Nerodimlja.

== Location and construction ==
Two fortresses were built on two adjacent hills of the southern slopes of Carraleva Mountain, above the king's court Nerodimlje and also above the confluence of two streams (Mala River and Golema River) that form Nerodimka River, west of the modern day town Ferizaj in Kosovo. Mali Petrič was built around 3.5 km south of the bigger fortress Veliki Petrič.

The remnants of both Veliki and Mali Petrič are covered with forest. Based on the configuration of the land it can be assumed that Veliki Petrič had triangular shape. The thickness of the remnants of the southern wall is between 2 and 2.2 metres (7 ft 3 in). It was built of large stones and lime mortar. There was a gate in southern wall which was 3.3 metres (11 ft) wide. Konstantin Jireček described remnants of four towers of this fort.

== History ==
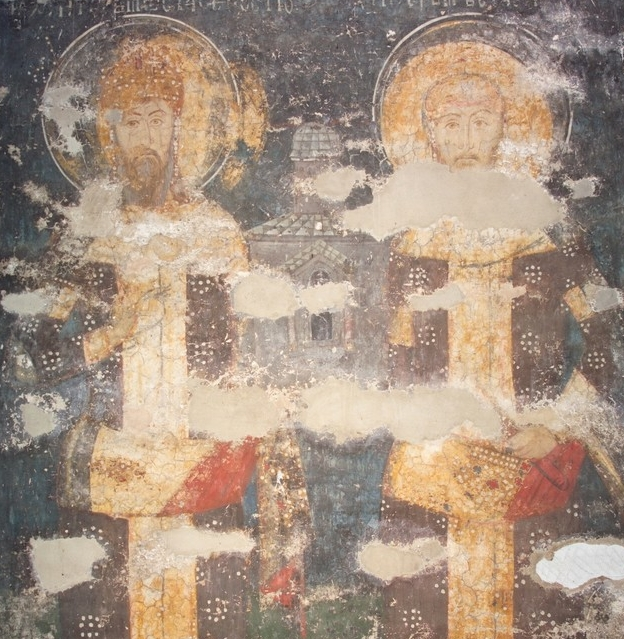
Fresco of father and son: Stephen of Dečani and Dušan the Mighty. Visoki Dečani monastery, 14th century (UNESCO).

Kingdom of Serbia had numerous temporary courts in its administrative districts known as župas. In Nerodimlje Župa there were three courts of King Milutin: Nerodimlje (below Petrič), Svrčin (on the island of Svrčin Lake) and Pauni. The fourth court within this complex was several kilometers north of Pauni, on the location of modern day Shtime village.

Petrič was often mentioned in connection with the struggle between Stefan Dušan and his father Stefan Dečanski over the throne of Serbia. In 1331 Stefan Dušan came from Shkodër to Nerodimlje to overthrow his father Stefan Dečanski who fled to Petrič with a small number of men. It is unknown whether it was Veliki or Mali Petrič. Dušan first captured the court in Nerodimlje with its treasury and besieged Petrič which he captured on 21 August 1331 and imprisoned his father in Zvečan Fortress, where he was strangled.

=== Administration ===
Petrič belonged to the following states:

- Since its establishment at the end of the 13th century until 1346 Petrič was part of the Kingdom of Serbia
- In period 1346–1371 it belonged to the Serbian Empire
- In period 1371–1412 Petrič was part of the District of Branković governed by Vuk Branković
- In period 1412–1441 it belonged to the Serbian Despotate.

Petrič was again mentioned when the valley below the fortress was registered (as the valley of Petric) in 1485 Ottoman defter. According to this defter this valley was populated with 13 Serbian and one Albanian household.

== See also ==
- Cultural monuments of the Kosovo district

== Sources ==
- Fine, John V. A. (1994). The Late Medieval Balkans: A Critical Survey from the Late Twelfth Century to the Ottoman Conquest. University of Michigan Press. ISBN 978-0-472-08260-5.
