= Sinan Pasha Mosque (Kaçanik) =

Mosque in Kaçanik, Kosovo

Sinan Pasha Mosque Xhamia e Sinan Pashës
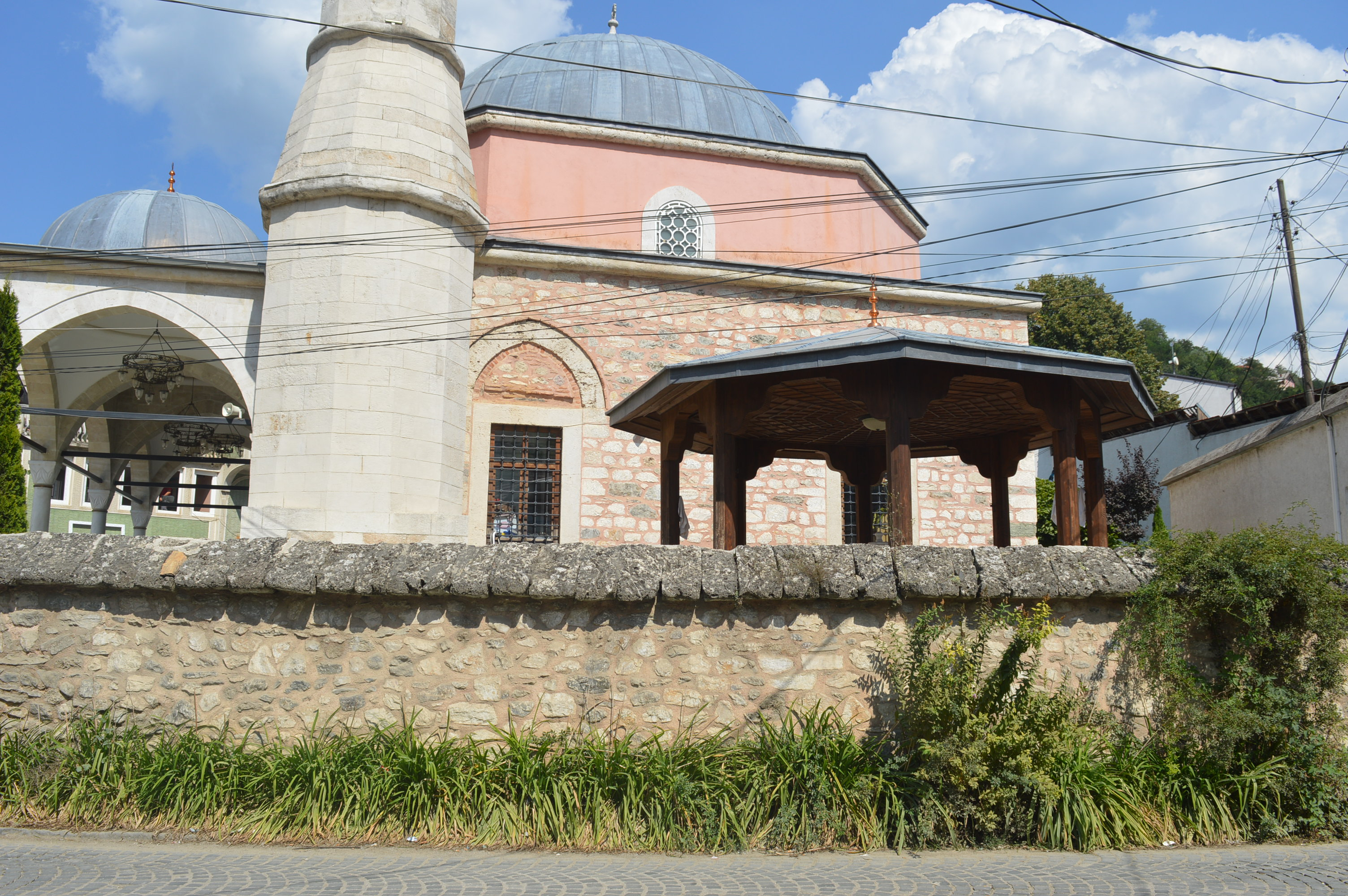

Religion
- Affiliation: Islam
- Ecclesiastical or organisational status: open

Location
- Location: Kaçanik, Kosovo
- Interactive map of Sinan Pasha Mosque; Xhamia e Sinan Pashës
- Coordinates: 42.227721°N 21.257448°E

Architecture
- Type: Mosque
- Completed: 1595; 431 years ago
- Minaret: 1
- Cultural Heritage under Permanent Protection
- Official name: Xhamia e Koxha Sinan Pashës
- Type: Architectural Heritage: Monument/Ensemble
- Criteria: Under Protection
- Reference no.: 3172

Sinan Pasha Mosque (Albanian: Xhamia e Sinan Pashës) is a mosque in Kaçanik, southern Kosovo. It was built in 1594–95.

The mosque was built by Sinan Pasha, the five-time Grand Vizier of the Ottoman Empire, along with the fort in Kaçanik.

== See also ==
- Cultural monuments of the Kosovo district
- Islam in Kosovo
- Religion in Kosovo
