= Immovable Cultural Heritage in the Kosovska Mitrovica District =

This list includes Immovable Cultural Heritage sites (listed by the Institute for the Protection of Cultural Monuments of Serbia) which are located in the Kosovska Mitrovica District of Serbia – which overlaps with the District of Mitrovica of Kosovo.

== Cultural monuments ==
Number in the Central Register	Photo	Monument	Municipality	Address	Designated since	Classification
SK 1371		Banjska Monastery	Zvečan	Banjska 42.971683°N 20.782819°E	26 August 1947	Exceptional Importance
SK 1373		Old Stone Bridge - Vojnović Bridge	Vučitrn	Vučitrn R. Dedovića St. 42.823375°N 20.960206°E	11 June 1949	Exceptional Importance
SK 1374		Vojinović Tower	Vučitrn	Vučitrn 42.822299°N 20.967431°E	19 May 1949	Exceptional Importance
SK 1413		Devič Monastery	Srbica	Lauša 42.718427°N 20.773760°E	24 March 1948	Exceptional Importance
SK 1416		Zvečan Fortress	Zvečan	Zvečan 42.904720°N 20.847622°E	29 August 1947	Exceptional Importance
SK 1449		Church of the Holy Protection of the Virgin - Sokolica	Zvečan	Veliko Rudare Boljetin 42.927385°N 20.862720°E	25 December 1948	Exceptional Importance
SK 1506		St. Parascheva Church	Zubin Potok	Čečevo 42.919601°N 20.613352°E	29 December 1966	
SK 1507		St. Nicholas' Church	Zubin Potok	Crepulja 42.883103°N 20.676735°E	25 December 1948	
SK 1508		Church of the Holy Virgin in Čitluk	Zubin Potok	Duboki Potok 42.920591°N 20.712414°E	25 December 1948	
SK 1510		Ćamilović's Old Town House	Vučitrn	Vučitrn 33 Mačvanska St.	31 December 1955	

== See also ==
- Immovable Cultural Heritage of Exceptional Importance (Serbia)
- Immovable Cultural Heritage of Great Importance (Serbia)
- Monuments of Kosovo
