= Pine of Tsar Dušan =

Pine of Tsar Dušan before being cut and burned by local Kosovar Albanians

Pine of Tsar Dušan (Serbian: Бор Цара Душана) was a giant black pine tree located in the courtyard of the old Serbian Orthodox Monastery and Church of the Holy Archangels, in the village cemetery of Gornje Nerodimlje, Ferizaj (Uroševac), Kosovo. The pine tree was planted in 1336 by Stefan Dušan and cut down and burned by local Albanian villagers in 1999.

== History ==
The old pine tree (Latin: Pinus heldreichii) as a relict, endemic tree, was one of the decorations of the Šar Mountains with its huge size. The pine was over 25 m (82 ft) high, 1.5 m (4 ft 11 in) wide, and had a bark thickness of 10 cm (3.9 in). It was in good health prior to its destruction. It was visited by various state delegations. King Aleksandar Karađorđević had a memorial plaque placed by it in 1926 with the year of planting. The Monastery of the Holy Archangels in Nerodimlje was, together with the Pine of Tsar Dušan, added on Monuments of Culture of Exceptional Importance-list by the Republic of Serbia in 1961, as a historical monument and natural rarity. Serbian institutions suggested that the Šar Mountains National Park be nominated for World Heritage under UNESCO protection, because of its biological, cultural and historical heritage; the pine tree was included in the proposal.

== Destruction ==
In June/July 1999, after the Kosovo War, the Monastery of the Holy Archangels and the cemetery was desecrated, while the pine was cut down and burned, by Albanian villagers returning from exile. Only the stump remained, which was later burned completely. As the entire complex was destroyed, there were no visible traces of Dušan's Pine, until 2014 when new branches started to sprout.

== See also ==
- Monuments of Culture of Exceptional Importance
- List of individual trees
