= Iđoš =

Iđoš Иђош (Serbian) Ђоши
- Village (Selo)
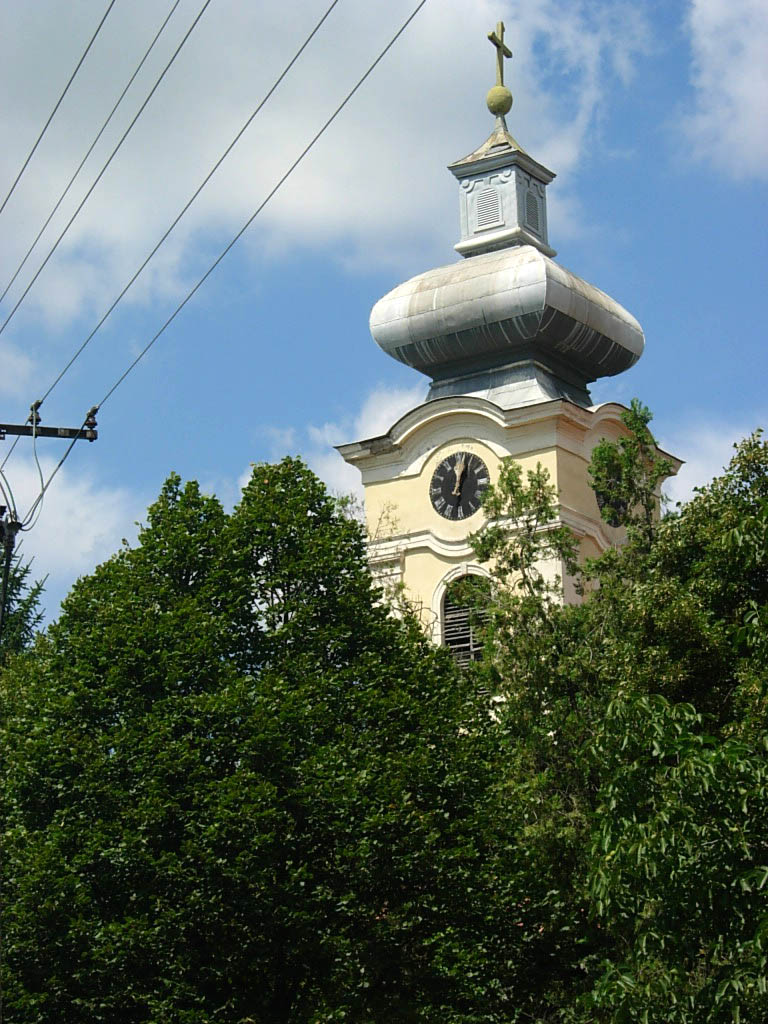
- The Orthodox Church

- Location of Iđoš within Serbia Iđoš (Serbia) Iđoš (Europe)
- Coordinates: 45°49′26″N 20°18′35″E
- Country: Serbia
- Province: Vojvodina
- Region: Banat
- District: North Banat
- Municipality: Kikinda
- Elevation: 83 m (272 ft)

Population (2002)
  - Iđoš: 2,174
- Demonym: Иђошани
- Time zone: UTC+1 (CET)
  - Summer (DST): UTC+2 (CEST)
- Postal code: 23323
- Area code: +381(0)230
- Car plates: KI

Iđoš (Serbian Cyrillic: Иђош; Hungarian: Tiszahegyes) is a village in Serbia. It is situated in the Kikinda municipality, North Banat District, in the Autonomous Province of Vojvodina. The village has a Serb ethnic majority (88.13%) and its population numbering 2,174 people (2002 census).

The Gradište archaeological site located in the village is part of the Cultural Heritage of Serbia list, inscribed in 1991.

== Historical population ==
- 1961: 2,857
- 1971: 2,540
- 1981: 2,338
- 1991: 2,263
- 2002: 2,174

== See also ==
- List of places in Serbia
- List of cities, towns and villages in Vojvodina
