= Immovable Cultural Heritage in the Kosovo District =

This list includes Immovable Cultural Heritage sites (listed by the Institute for the Protection of Cultural Monuments of Serbia) which are located in the Kosovska Mitrovica District of Serbia – which, except for not including the municipality of Novo Brdo, overlaps with the District of Pristina and District of Ferizaj of Kosovo. (Note: In 2000, the United Nations Interim Administration Mission in Kosovo implemented a redistricting of Kosovo.)

== Cultural monuments ==
=== Exceptional importance ===
| Number in the Central Register | Picture | Name | City/Municipality | Location address | designated cultural heritage | Exceptional importance since | Comment |
|---|---|---|---|---|---|---|---|
| SK 1367 | | Gračanica monastery | Pristina | Gračanica | 25 October 1947 | 4 June 1990 | World Heritage Site |
| SK 1392 | | Serbian Orthodox Church of the Presentation of the Virgin | Lipljan | Lipljan | 19 October 1949 | 3 December 1990 | |
| SK 1412 | | Imperial Mosque | Pristina | Pristina; Dunavska St. | 17 September 1953 | 3 December 1990 | |
| SK 1417 | | Nerodimlje Medieval Town with St. Nicholas' Church and Ruins of Byzantine basilica | Uroševac | Gornje Nerodimlje | 31 December 1967 | 3 December 1990 (cluster "Monuments of Nerodimlje") | |
| SK 1418 | | Mali and Veliki Petrič Medieval Fortresses | Uroševac | Gornje Nerodimlje; Jezerce | 31 December 1967 | 3 December 1990 (cluster "Monuments of Nerodimlje") | |
| SK 1419 | | Church of Dormition of the Virgin – "Monastery of St. Uroš" | Uroševac | Gornje Nerodimlje; Jezerce | 29 December 1966 | 3 December 1990 (cluster "Monuments of Nerodimlje") | Albanians completely destroyed the monastery, using explosives, in 1999. |
| SK 1420 | | Church of the Holy Archangels | Uroševac | Gornje Nerodimlje | 19 July 1966 | 3 December 1990 (cluster "Monuments of Nerodimlje") | The church was looted and set on fire by the Albanians in 1999. A giant black pine tree was cut down and burned. The church cemetery was desecrated and the tombstones knocked over and damaged. |
| — | | Church of St Stephen | Uroševac | Donje Nerodimlje | — | 3 December 1990 (cluster "Monuments of Nerodimlje") | The Church of St Stephen in Donje Nerodimlje was classified as a Cultural Monument of Exceptional Importance by the National Assembly as part of the cluster "Monuments of Nerodimlje", although it has never been proclaimed a Cultural Heritage at the first place. Thus, it is not inscribed into the Central Register. It was demolished, burned, and destroyed by explosive by the Albanians in 1999. |
| — | | Church of St George in Gornja Bitinja | Štrpce | Gornja Bitinja | — | 3 December 1990 (cluster "Churches of Sirinićka Župa") | The Church of St George in Gornja Bitinja was classified as a Cultural Monument of Exceptional Importance by the National Assembly as part of the cluster "Churches of Sirinićka Župa", although it has never been proclaimed a Cultural Heritage at the first place. Thus, it is not inscribed in the Central Register. |
| SK 1421 | | St. Theodor Tyron's Church in Donja Bitinja | Štrpce | Donja Bitinja | 16 April 1958 | 3 December 1990 (cluster "Churches of Sirinićka Župa") | |
| SK 1422 | | St. Nicholas' Church in Gotovuša | Štrpce | Gotovuša | 16 April 1958 | 3 December 1990 (cluster "Churches of Sirinićka Župa") | |
| SK 1423 | | St. Nicholas' Church in Štrpce | Štrpce | Štrpce | 7 February 1967 | 3 December 1990 (cluster "Churches of Sirinićka Župa") | |

=== Listed ===
| ID | Monument | Address | Municipality | Dating | Photo |
|---|---|---|---|---|---|
| SK 1513 | Sinan Pasha Mosque (Kaçanik) | 42.227596°N 21.25749°E | Kačanik | | |

== See also ==
- Immovable Cultural Heritage of Exceptional Importance (Serbia)
- Immovable Cultural Heritage of Great Importance (Serbia)
- Monuments of Kosovo
