= Sterijino =

Sterijino Стеријино (Serbian) Valkaisor (Hungarian)
- Village (Selo)
- Location of Sterijino within Serbia Sterijino (Serbia) Sterijino (Europe)
- Coordinates: 45°48′05″N 20°01′13″E
- Country: Serbia
- Province: Vojvodina
- District: North Banat
- Municipalities: Ada
- Elevation: 91 m (299 ft)

Population (2002)
  - Sterijino: 234
- Time zone: UTC+1 (CET)
  - Summer (DST): UTC+2 (CEST)
- Area code: +381(0)24
- Car plates: SA

Sterijino (Serbian Cyrillic: Стеријино, Hungarian: Valkaisor) is a village in Serbia. It is situated in the Ada municipality, in the North Banat District, Vojvodina province. The village has a Hungarian ethnic majority (94.87%) and it has a population of 234 people (2002 census).

== See also ==
- List of places in Serbia
- List of cities, towns and villages in Vojvodina
