= Neredimë e Epërme =

Nerodimë e Epërme
- village
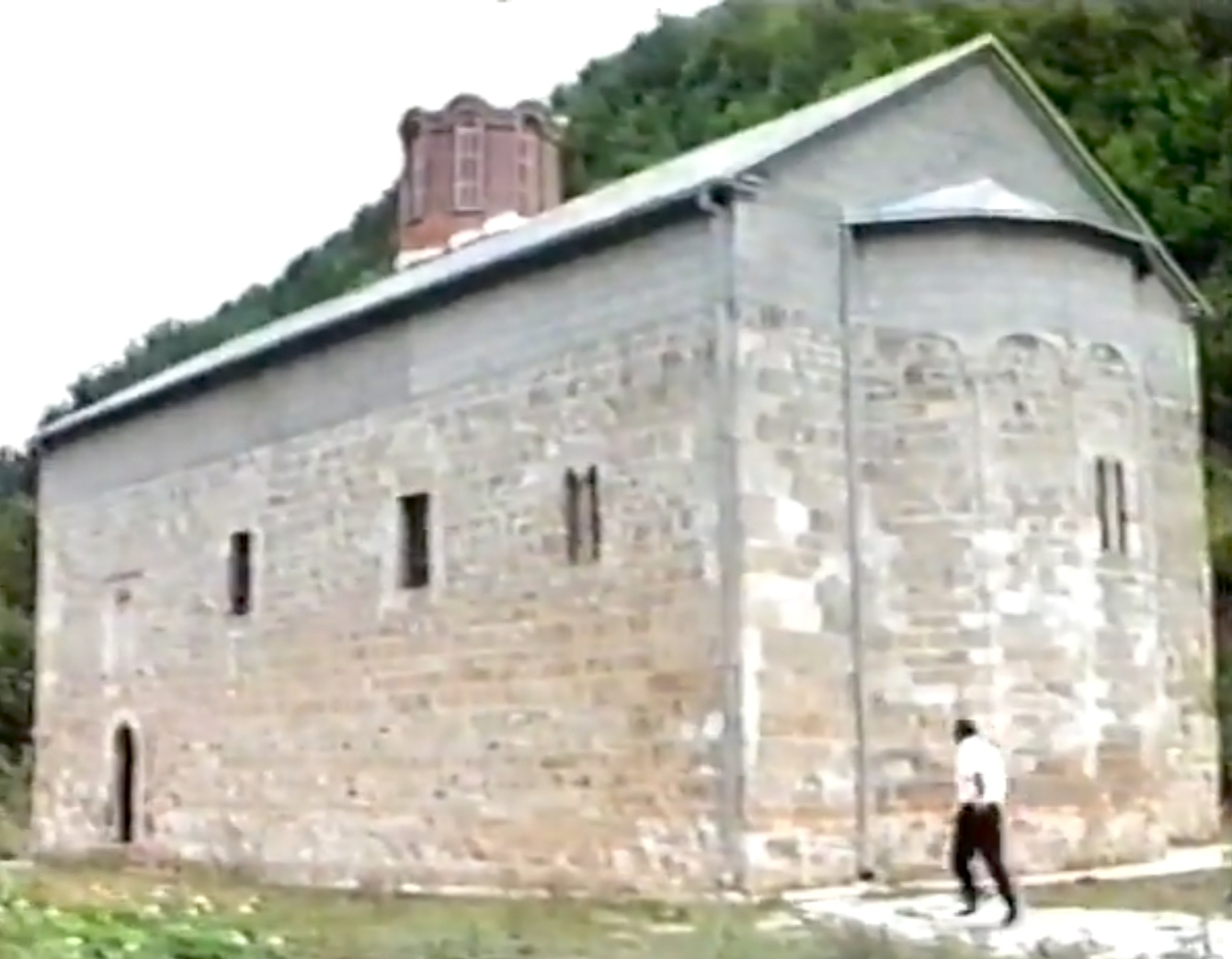
- Monastery of Emperor Uroš (1998)

- Location within Kosovo
- Coordinates: 42.3703°N 21.0786°E
- Location: Kosovo
- District: Ferizaj
- Municipality: Ferizaj

Population (2024)
  - Total: 1,418

Nerodimë e Epërme (Serbian: Gornje Nerodimlje, Serbian Cyrillic: Горње Неродимље) is a village in Ferizaj municipality, in southeastern Republic of Kosovo. The village was first mentioned in the Gračanica charters (1311–16) of Serbian King Stefan Milutin.

== Geography ==
The settlement lies in the cadastral area of Nerodimë e Epërme which has 1107 hectares.

== History ==
The village was first mentioned in the Gračanica charters (1311–16) of Serbian King Stefan Milutin. Serbian King Stefan Dečanski had one of his royal courts here, in which the Dečani chrysobull was written in 1330. Emperor Stefan Dušan and his son Uroš V had their court near the fortresses of Gornji and Donji Petrič.

Stefan Milutin died in 1321, in the courtyard of the Church of the Holy Archangels, from where his body was transferred to his endowment, the Banjska monastery. In 1371, the last monarch of the Nemanjić dynasty, Emperor Uroš V, also died, in Nerodimlje. In 1705, his body was transferred to the Jazak monastery in Fruška Gora (in northern Serbia).

According to the Ottoman defter (tax registry), there was 71 Serbian households and two Orthodox priests. Several church buildings and ruins are located in the village.

The local monastery and church was built in the 14th century, and renovated in 1700. Up until 1975, a giant black pine tree grew above the church, said to have been planted by Stefan Dušan in 1336.

The Monastery of St. Uroš is situated in a hamlet above the village, and it is said to have been founded by Empress Jelena on the grave of her only son Uroš V. His remains were transferred to Jazak from this church. There are also ruins of the Church of St. Nicholas and foundations of three churches whose dedication is unknown.

Several ethnic Serbs were abducted from the village during the Kosovo War (1998–99). The Church of the Holy Archangels was looted and burnt. Also, all of the Serbian gravestones were desecrated or destroyed.

Demographic history
Ethnic group	1948	1953	1961	1971	1981	1991	2011
Albanians					935 (49.58%)		1638 (99.39%)
Serbs					686 (36.37%)		0 (0.00%)
Others					19		10
Total	845	935	1219	1267	1641	1886	1648
