= Martonoš =

Martonoš Мартонош (Serbian) Martonos (Hungarian)
- Village (Selo)
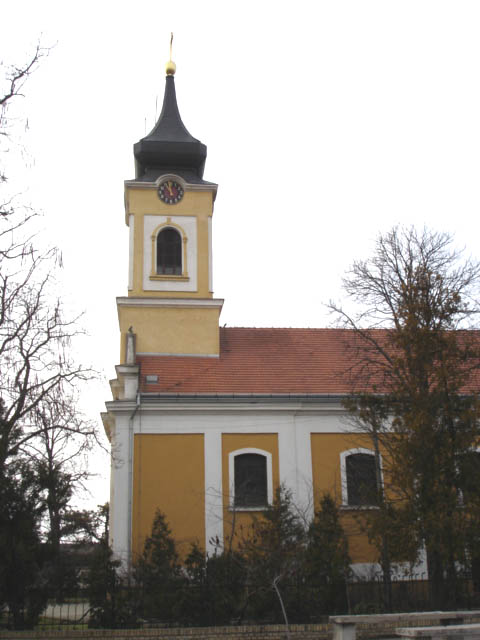
- The Roman Catholic church

- Location of Vojvoda Zimonić within Serbia Martonoš (Serbia) Martonoš (Europe)
- Coordinates: 46°06′00″N 20°03′00″E
- Country: Serbia
- Province: Vojvodina
- District: North Banat
- Municipalities: Kanjiža
- Elevation: 76 m (249 ft)

Population (2022)
  - Martonoš: 1,429
- Time zone: UTC+1 (CET)
  - Summer (DST): UTC+2 (CEST)
- Postal code: 24417
- Area code: +381(0)24
- Car plates: KA

Martonoš (Serbian Cyrillic: Мартонош, Hungarian: Martonos, German: Martonosch, Turkish: Martonoş) is a village located in the Kanjiža municipality, in the North Banat District of Serbia. It is situated in the Autonomous Province of Vojvodina. The village has a Hungarian ethnic majority (86.89%) and its population is 1,429 people (2022 census).

== Historical population ==
- 1961: 3,400
- 1971: 2,996
- 1981: 2,737
- 1991: 2,423
- 2002: 2,183

== See also ==
- List of places in Serbia
- List of cities, towns and villages in Vojvodina

== Sister cities ==
Martonos is twinned with:

- Gátér, Hungary
- Martfű, Hungary
- Algyő, Hungary
- Újvár, Romania
