= Ada, Serbia =

Ada Ада (Serbian) Ada (Hungarian)
- Town and municipality
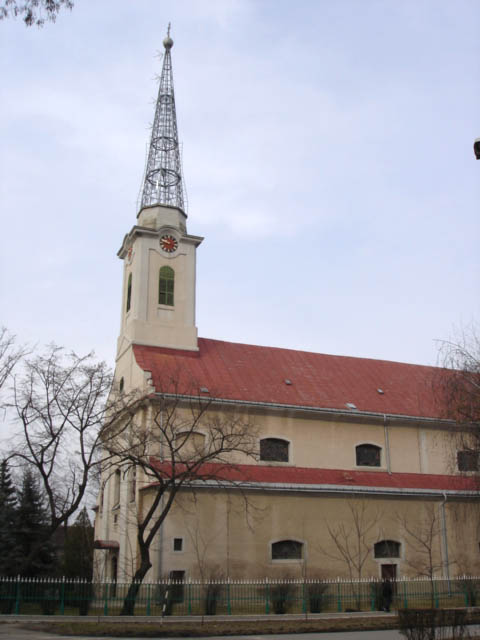
- Catholic Church in Ada

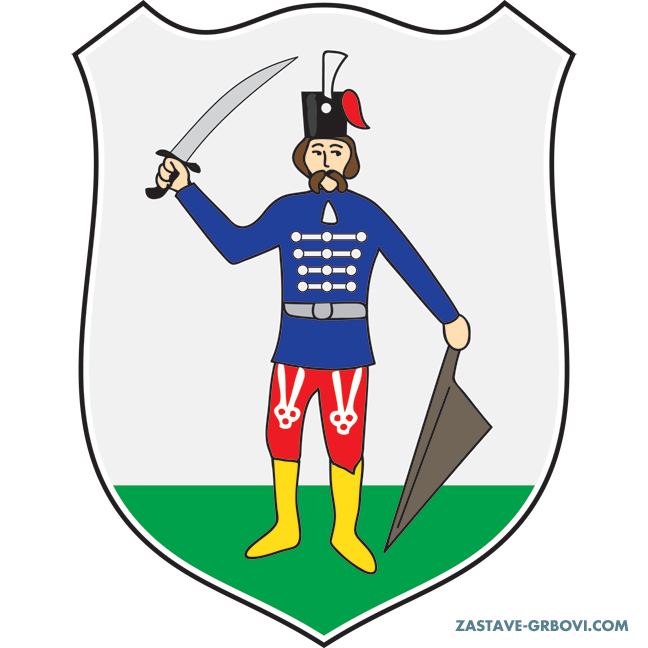
- Coat of arms

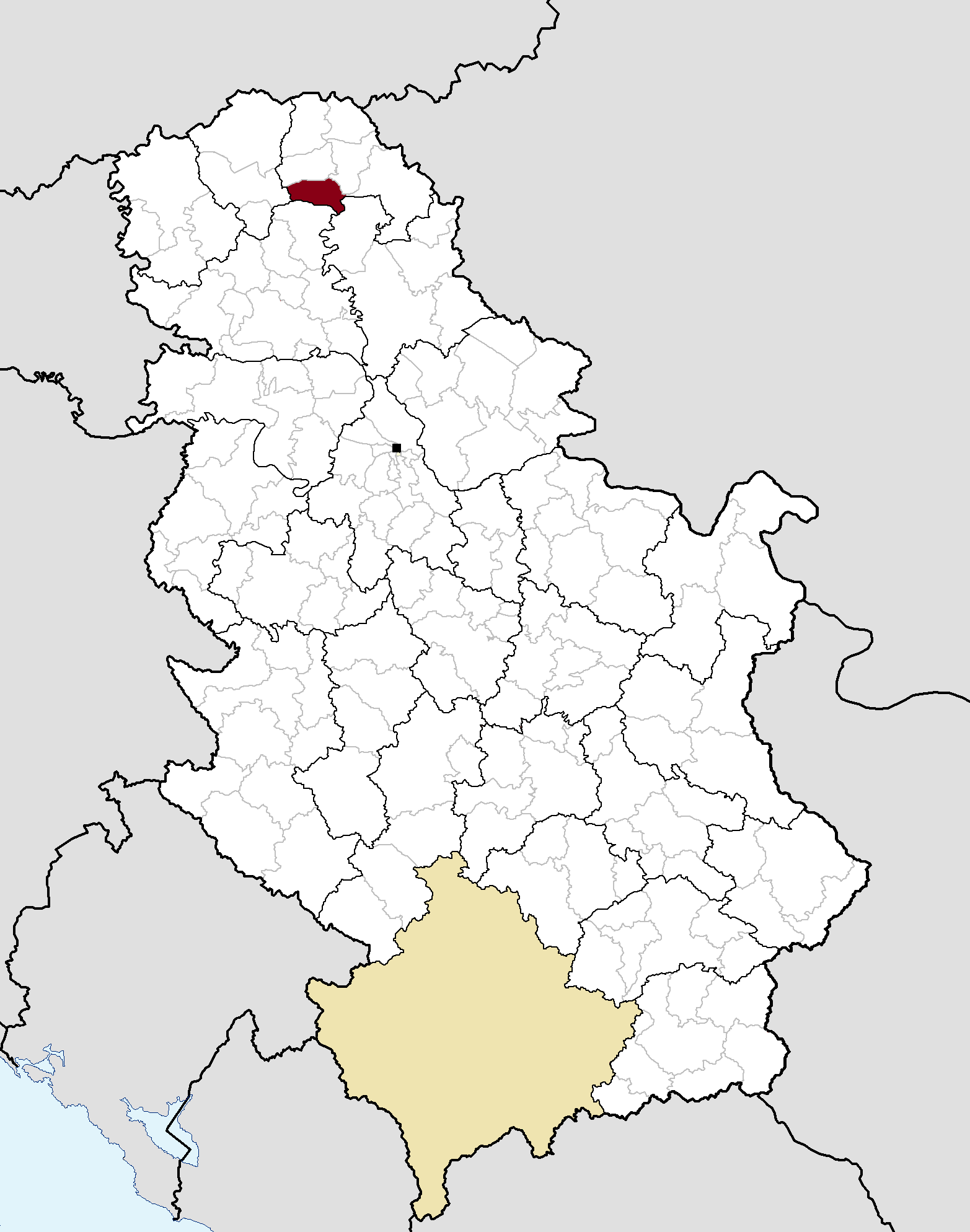
- Location of Ada within Serbia
- Coordinates: 45°48′N 20°08′E
- Country: Serbia
- Province: Vojvodina
- District: North Banat

Government
  - Mayor: Zoltán Bilicki (SNS)

Area
  - Ada: 228.6 km^{2} (88.26 sq mi)
- Elevation: 83 m (272 ft)

Population (2022)
  - Ada: 7,423
  - Metro: 13,293
- Time zone: UTC+1 (CET)
  - Summer (DST): UTC+2 (CEST)
- Postal code: 24430
- Area code: +381(0)24
- Car plates: SA
- Official languages: Serbian together with Hungarian
- Website: www.ada.org.rs

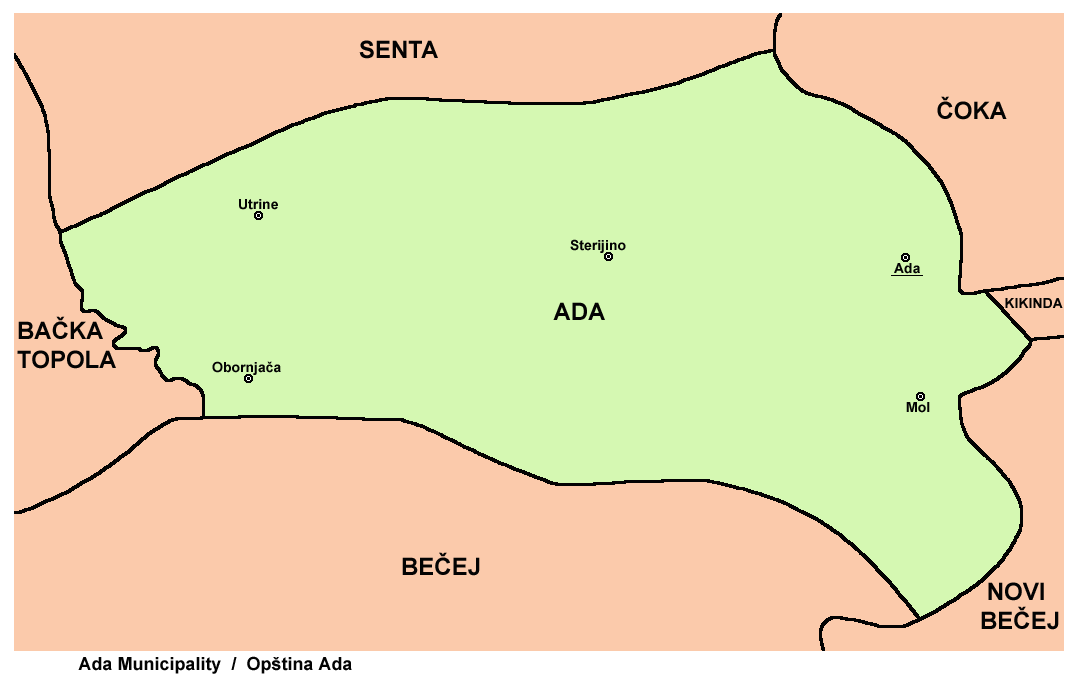
Map of Ada municipality

Ada (Serbian Cyrillic: Ада; Hungarian: Ada) is a town and municipality located in the North Banat District of the autonomous province of Vojvodina, Serbia. It is situated near the river Tisa in the geographical region of Bačka. The town has a population of 7,423, while the municipality has 13,293 inhabitants (2022 census), and a 72.71% Hungarian majority.

The municipality of Ada includes the towns of Ada (the seat) and nearby Mol, and the villages of Utrine, Obornjača and Sterijino.

== Name ==
The name of the town comes from Serbo-Croatian àda, itself from Ottoman Turkish آطه which means an island in a river or lake.

== Demographics ==
Historical population
Year	Pop.	±% p.a.
1948	22,235	—
1953	21,676	−0.51%
1961	22,234	+0.32%
1971	22,611	+0.17%
1981	22,408	−0.09%
1991	21,506	−0.41%
2002	18,994	−1.12%
2011	16,991	−1.23%
2022	13,293	−2.21%

According to the 2011 census, the total population of the Ada municipality was 16,991 inhabitants.

=== Ethnic groups ===
All local communities in the municipality have a Hungarian majority.

The ethnic composition of the municipality is:

Ethnic group	Population	%
Hungarians	12,750	75%
Serbs	2,956	17.4%
Roma	323	1.9%
Yugoslavs	74	0.4%
Croats	50	0.3%
Albanians	25	0.1%
Slovaks	18	0.1%
Others	795	4.7%
Total	16,991	

=== Jewish history ===
A Jewish community was founded in the city in 1790. Over the years, pogroms, assaults and murders against them against the background of anti-Semitism were carried out.

The first rabbi of the city was Rabbi Aharon Ackerman, followed by Rabbi Yaakov Heilbronn, who was murdered by rioters. In 1880, 410 Jews lived in the community and in 1896 a synagogue was established. In 1925, 470 Jews lived in the town.

In April 1941, Nazi Germany invaded the area and 60 Jews were murdered. Most of the community's Jews were later murdered in the Holocaust. 59 survivors immigrated to Israel in 1948 and in 1973 the synagogue was demolished by order of the Yugoslavian authorities.

== Economy ==
The following table gives a preview of total number of registered people employed in legal entities per their core activity (as of 2018):

Activity	Total
Agriculture, forestry and fishing	16
Mining and quarrying	-
Manufacturing	2,341
Electricity, gas, steam and air conditioning supply	5
Water supply; sewerage, waste management and remediation activities	29
Construction	83
Wholesale and retail trade, repair of motor vehicles and motorcycles	658
Transportation and storage	139
Accommodation and food services	91
Information and communication	53
Financial and insurance activities	40
Real estate activities	2
Professional, scientific and technical activities	114
Administrative and support service activities	45
Public administration and defense; compulsory social security	151
Education	261
Human health and social work activities	234
Arts, entertainment and recreation	31
Other service activities	80
Individual agricultural workers	349
Total	4,722

== Sports ==
Football club FK AFK Ada plays in the Serbian 5th tier-PFL Subotica as of the 2025/25 season.

== Notable people ==
- Mátyás Rákosi (1892–1971), Hungarian communist leader
- Arpad Sterbik (born 1979), Yugoslav and Spanish handball goalkeeper

== International relations ==
=== Twin towns — Sister cities ===
Ada is twinned with:

- Újbuda, Hungary
- Makó, Hungary
- Inárcs, Hungary
- Nemesnádudvar, Hungary
- Joseni, Romania
- Budakalász, Hungary
- Bogyiszló, Hungary

== See also ==
- List of places in Serbia
- List of cities, towns and villages in Vojvodina
- List of Hungarian communities in Vojvodina
