= Utrine (Ada) =

Utrine Утрине (Serbian) Törökfalu (Hungarian)
- Village (Selo)
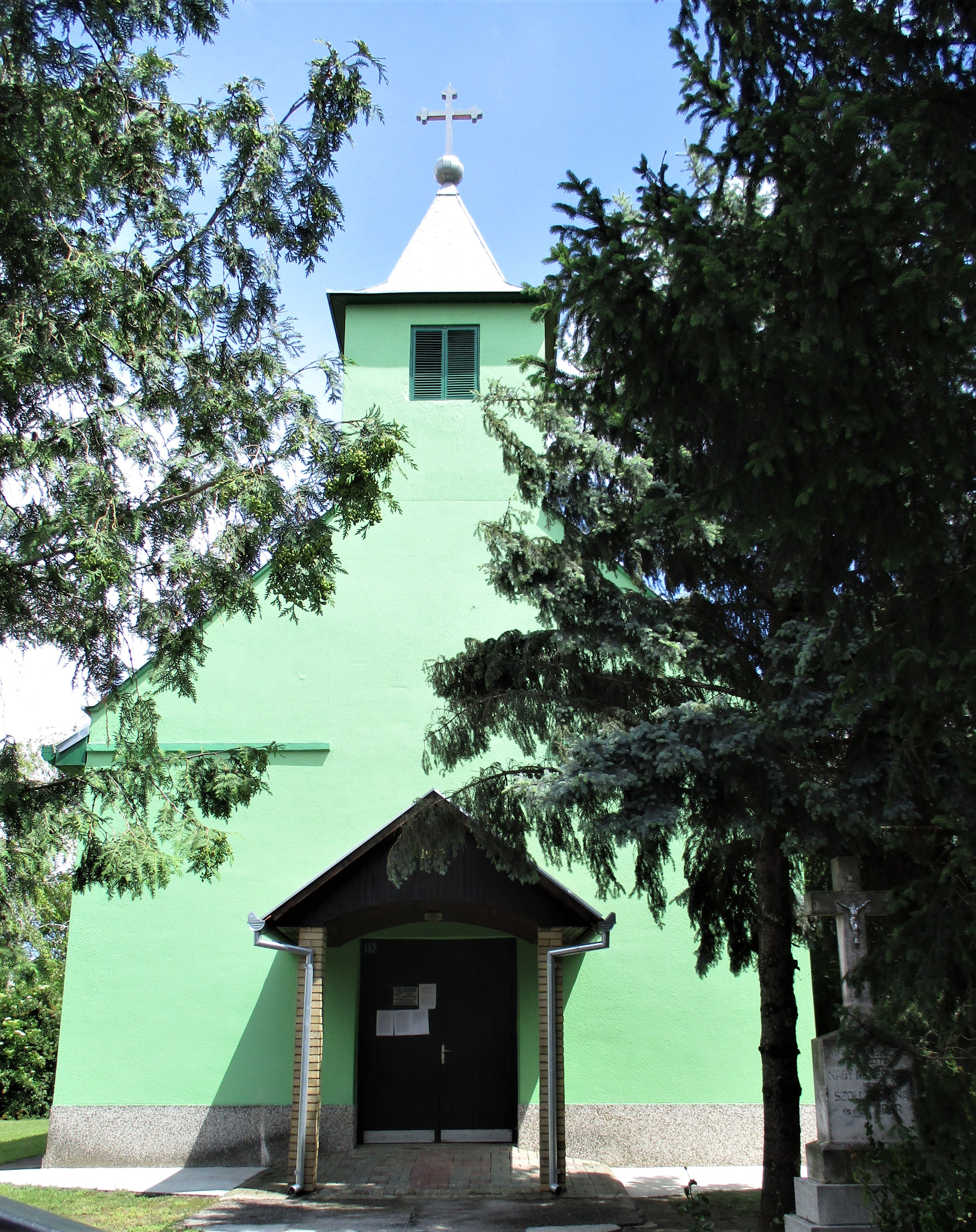
- Catholic church

- Location of Utrine within Serbia Utrine (Serbia) Utrine (Europe)
- Coordinates: 45°48′24″N 19°53′34″E
- Country: Serbia
- Province: Vojvodina
- District: North Banat
- Municipalities: Ada
- Elevation: 101 m (331 ft)

Population (2022)
  - Utrine: 691
- Time zone: UTC+1 (CET)
  - Summer (DST): UTC+2 (CEST)
- Postal code: 24437
- Area code: +381(0)24
- Car plates: SA

Utrine (Serbian Cyrillic: Утрине, Hungarian: Törökfalu) is a village in Serbia. It is situated in the Ada municipality, in the North Banat District, Vojvodina province. The village has a Hungarian ethnic majority (97.49%) and it has a population of 691 people (2022 census).

== See also ==
- List of places in Serbia
- List of cities, towns and villages in Vojvodina
