= Obornjača (Ada) =

Obornjača Оборњача (Serbian) Völgypart (Hungarian)
- Village (Selo)
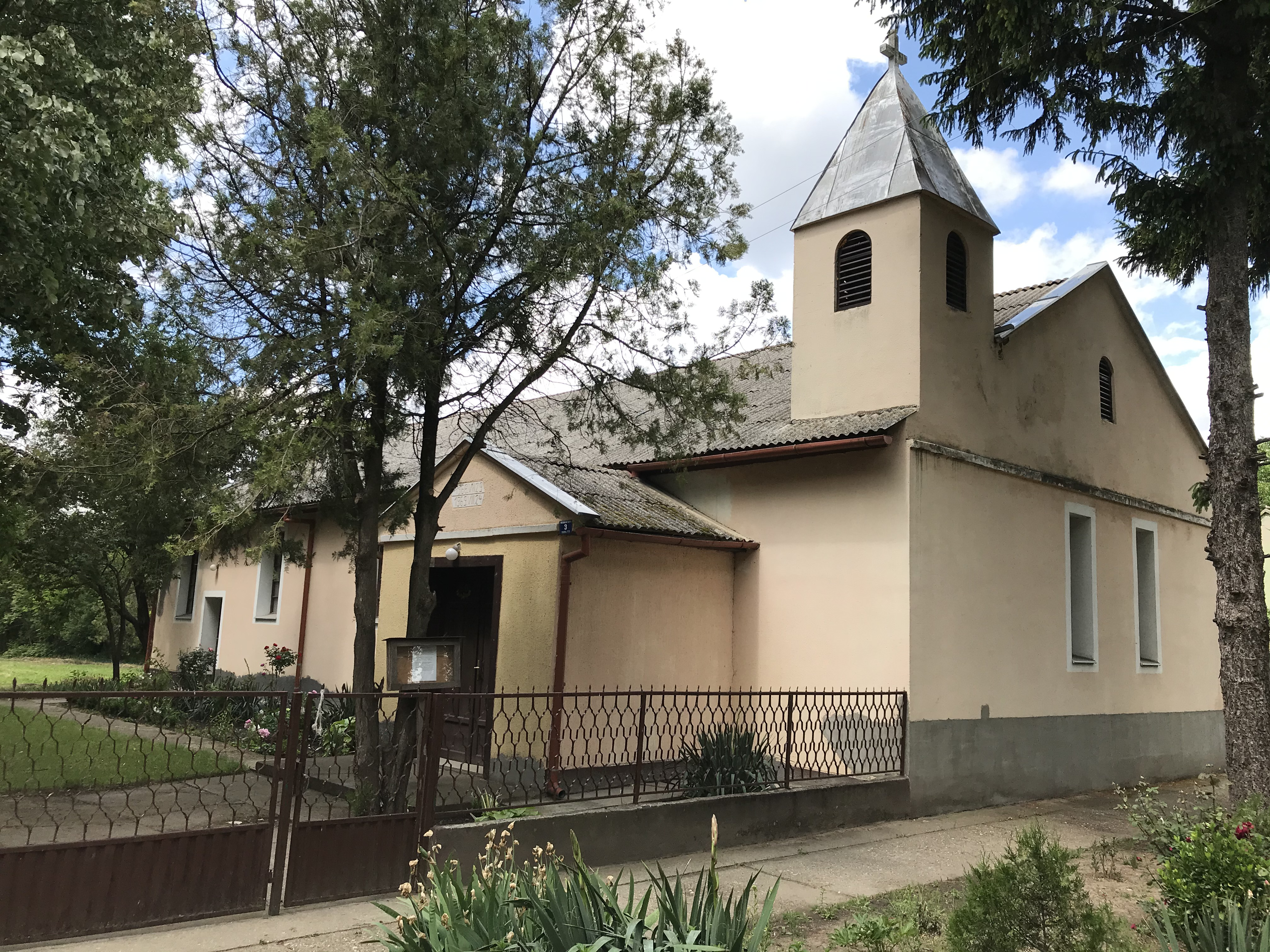
- Place of worship

- Location of Obornjača within Serbia Obornjača (Serbia) Obornjača (Europe)
- Coordinates: 45°46′13″N 19°53′17″E
- Country: Serbia
- Province: Vojvodina
- District: North Banat
- Municipalities: Ada
- Elevation: 108 m (354 ft)

Population (2002)
  - Obornjača: 389
- Time zone: UTC+1 (CET)
  - Summer (DST): UTC+2 (CEST)
- Area code: +381(0)24
- Car plates: SA

Obornjača (Serbian Cyrillic: Оборњача, Hungarian: Völgypart) is a village in Serbia. It is situated in the Ada municipality, in the North Banat District, Vojvodina province. The village has a Hungarian ethnic majority (93.31%) and it has a population of 389 people (2002 census).

== See also ==
- List of places in Serbia
- List of cities, towns and villages in Vojvodina
