= Cultural heritage of Serbia =

Cultural heritage of Serbia (Serbian: Културна добра Србије, romanized: Kulturna dobra Srbije, lit. 'Cultural Goods of Serbia') represents the totality of national cultural heritage in Serbia (including Kosovo) as defined by Serbia's Law on Cultural Goods. Some of national heritage sites in Serbia are also World Heritage Sites.

== Classification ==
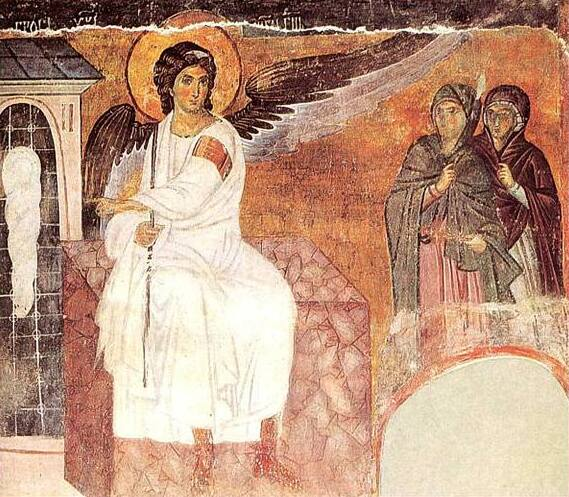
the White Angel fresco, from the Monastery of Mileševa

The cultural heritage of Serbia is classified and categorized by the law. Primarily, it is divided into two main groups, first including tangible cultural heritage (such as works of art, historical monuments, archeological sites, architecturally prominent buildings, archival and museum artifacts, old and rare books, cultural landscapes), and second including intangible cultural heritage (such as folklore, traditions, language, knowledge).

Tangible cultural heritage is further classified as immovable and movable. The first group includes historical and architectural monuments, historical and archeological sites, cultural and historical landscapes. The second group includes works of art, archival and museum artifacts, old and rare books etc.

== Immovable Cultural heritage ==
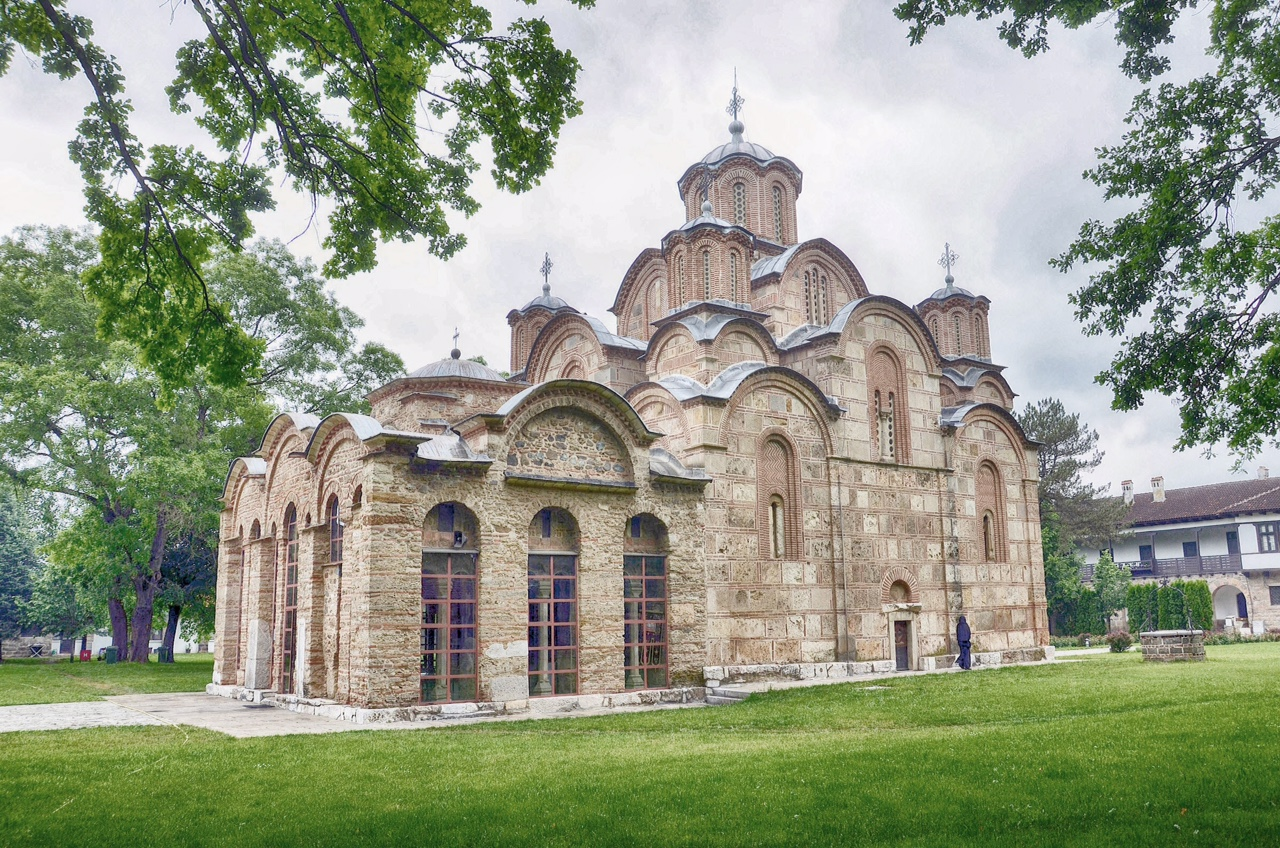
Serbian Orthodox Monastery of Gračanica, from the beginning of the 14th century (World Heritage Site)

The preservation and protection of the Immovable cultural heritage sites in Serbia is entrusted to the National Institute for Protection of Cultural Monuments. The institute maintains the Central Register of the Immovable Cultural Heritage. The Register currently lists 2,624 heritage sites classified in four categories: cultural monuments, archaeological sites, historic landmarks and spatial cultural-historical units. Exactly 200 of those are classified as being "of exceptional importance", and thus entitled to the highest level of protection. Further 582 are classified as being "of great importance", while the rest are "unclassified".

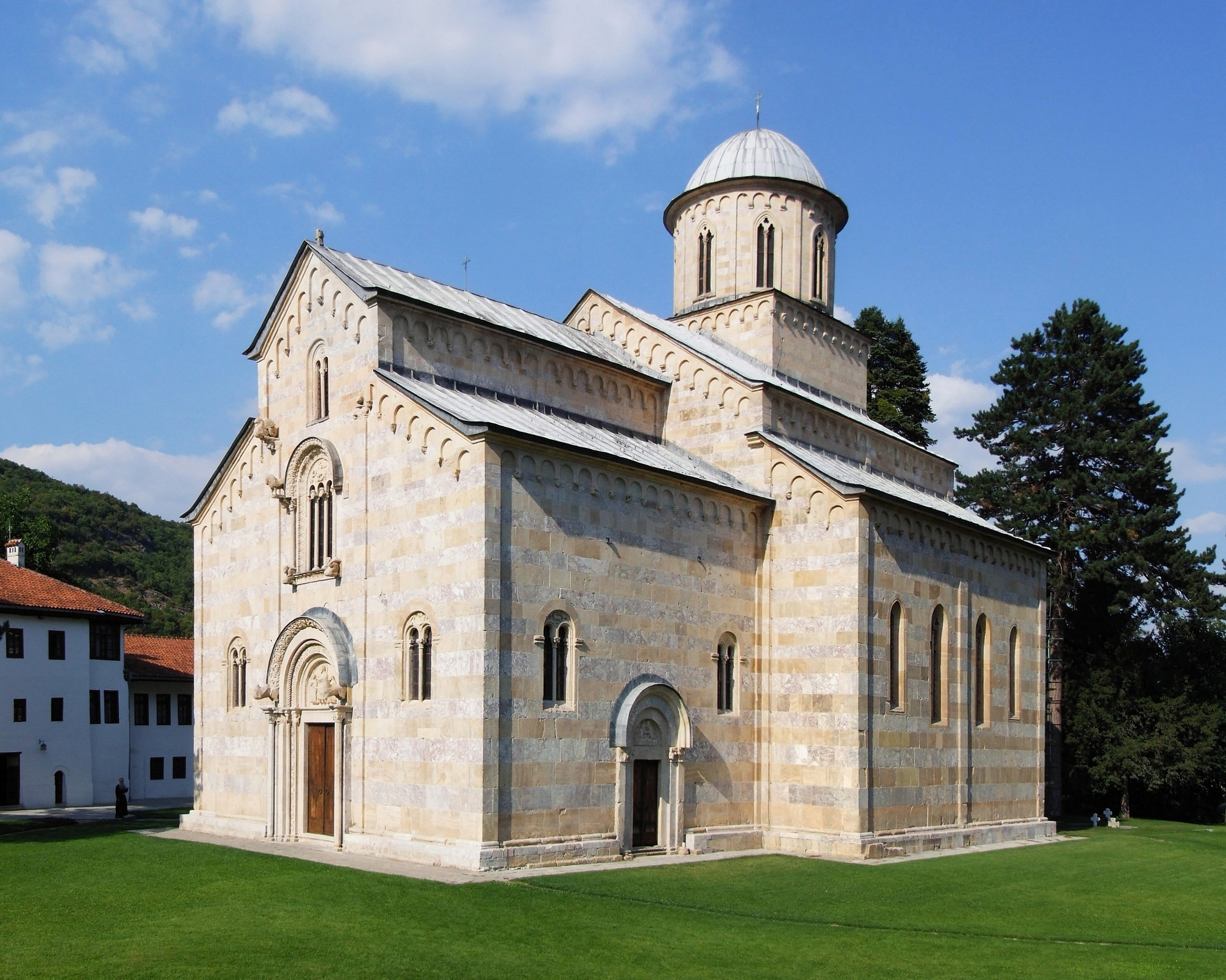
Serbian Orthodox Monastery of Dečani, from the first half of the 14th century (World Heritage Site)

Those sites enjoy the highest level of the state protection ("Exceptional Importance"), as defined by the Law. In order to be on the list, properties must meet at least one of the following criteria:

- Embodies special significance pertaining to the social, historical and cultural development of peoples in the nation's history and development of the nation's natural environment;
- Testifies to crucial historical events and personalities and their activities in the nation's history;
- Is a unique or rare representation of the human creativity of a certain time period or a unique example from natural history;
- Exhibits exceptional artistic or aesthetic value.

=== Lists ===
In the Central Register there are, as of March 2026, 2658 registered immovable cultural properties, out of which 2277 are cultural monuments, 97 are spatial cultural-historical units, 203 are archaeological sites and 81 are historic landmarks. There are 783 classified immovable cultural properties, out of which 201 are of exceptional importance, and 582 of great importance.

Among immovable cultural properties of exceptional importance there are 155 monuments of culture, 12 spatial cultural-historical units, 18 archaeological sites and 16 landmarks. Among cultural properties of great importance, there are 512 monuments of culture, 28 spatial cultural-historical units, 25 archaeological sites and 17 landmarks.

- List of Immovable Cultural Heritage of Exceptional Importance
- List of Immovable Cultural Heritage of Great Importance

==== By district ====
- Immovable Cultural Heritage in Belgrade
- Immovable Cultural Heritage in the North Bačka District
- Immovable Cultural Heritage in the Central Banat District
- Immovable Cultural Heritage in the North Banat District
- Immovable Cultural Heritage in the South Banat District
- Immovable Cultural Heritage in the West Bačka District
- Immovable Cultural Heritage in the South Bačka District
- Immovable Cultural Heritage in the Srem District
- Immovable Cultural Heritage in the Mačva District
- Immovable Cultural Heritage in the Kolubara District
- Immovable Cultural Heritage in the Podunavlje District
- Immovable Cultural Heritage in the Braničevo District
- Immovable Cultural Heritage in the Šumadija District
- Immovable Cultural Heritage in the Pomoravlje District
- Immovable Cultural Heritage in the Bor District
- Immovable Cultural Heritage in the Zaječar District
- Immovable Cultural Heritage in the Zlatibor District
- Immovable Cultural Heritage in the Moravica District
- Immovable Cultural Heritage in the Raška District
- Immovable Cultural Heritage in the Rasina District
- Immovable Cultural Heritage in the Nišava District
- Immovable Cultural Heritage in the Toplica District
- Immovable Cultural Heritage in the Pirot District
- Immovable Cultural Heritage in the Jablanica District
- Immovable Cultural Heritage in the Pčinja District
- Immovable Cultural Heritage in the Kosovo District
- Immovable Cultural Heritage in the Peć District
- Immovable Cultural Heritage in the Prizren District
- Immovable Cultural Heritage in the Kosovska Mitrovica District
- Immovable Cultural Heritage in the Kosovo-Pomoravlje District

== See also ==
- World Heritage Sites in Serbia
- List of protected natural resources in Serbia
- Culture of Serbia
