= Destruction of Serbian heritage in Kosovo =

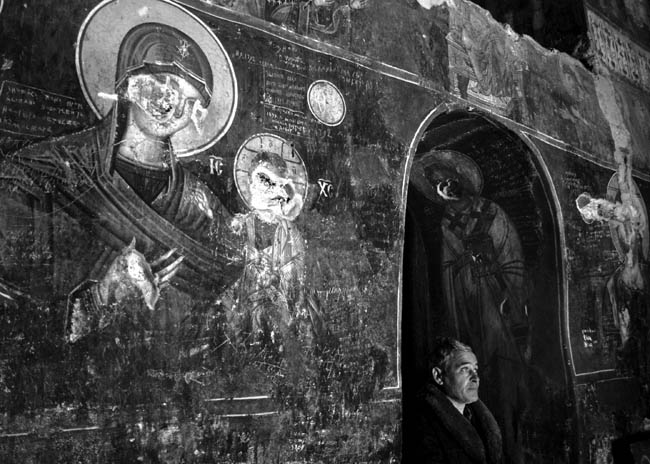
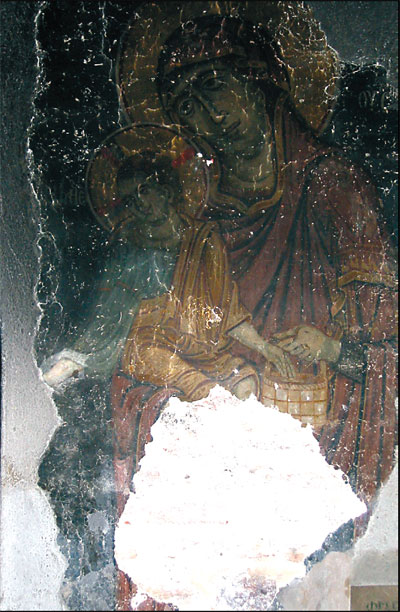
Left: Ruined medieval Serbian Orthodox monastery
Right: Icon from UNESCO World Heritage Site Our Lady of Ljeviš in Prizren damaged during 2004 unrest in Kosovo.

Serbian cultural and religious sites in Kosovo were systematically vandalized and destroyed over several historical periods, during the Ottoman rule, World War I, World War II, Yugoslav communist rule, Kosovo War and 2004 unrest.

According to the International Center for Transitional Justice, 155 Serbian Orthodox churches and monasteries were destroyed by Kosovo Albanians between June 1999 and March 2004. The Medieval Monuments in Kosovo, founded by the Nemanjić dynasty, is a combined World Heritage Site consisting of four Serbian Orthodox Christian churches and monasteries. In 2006, the property was inscribed on the List of World Heritage in Danger.

== Ottoman Empire ==
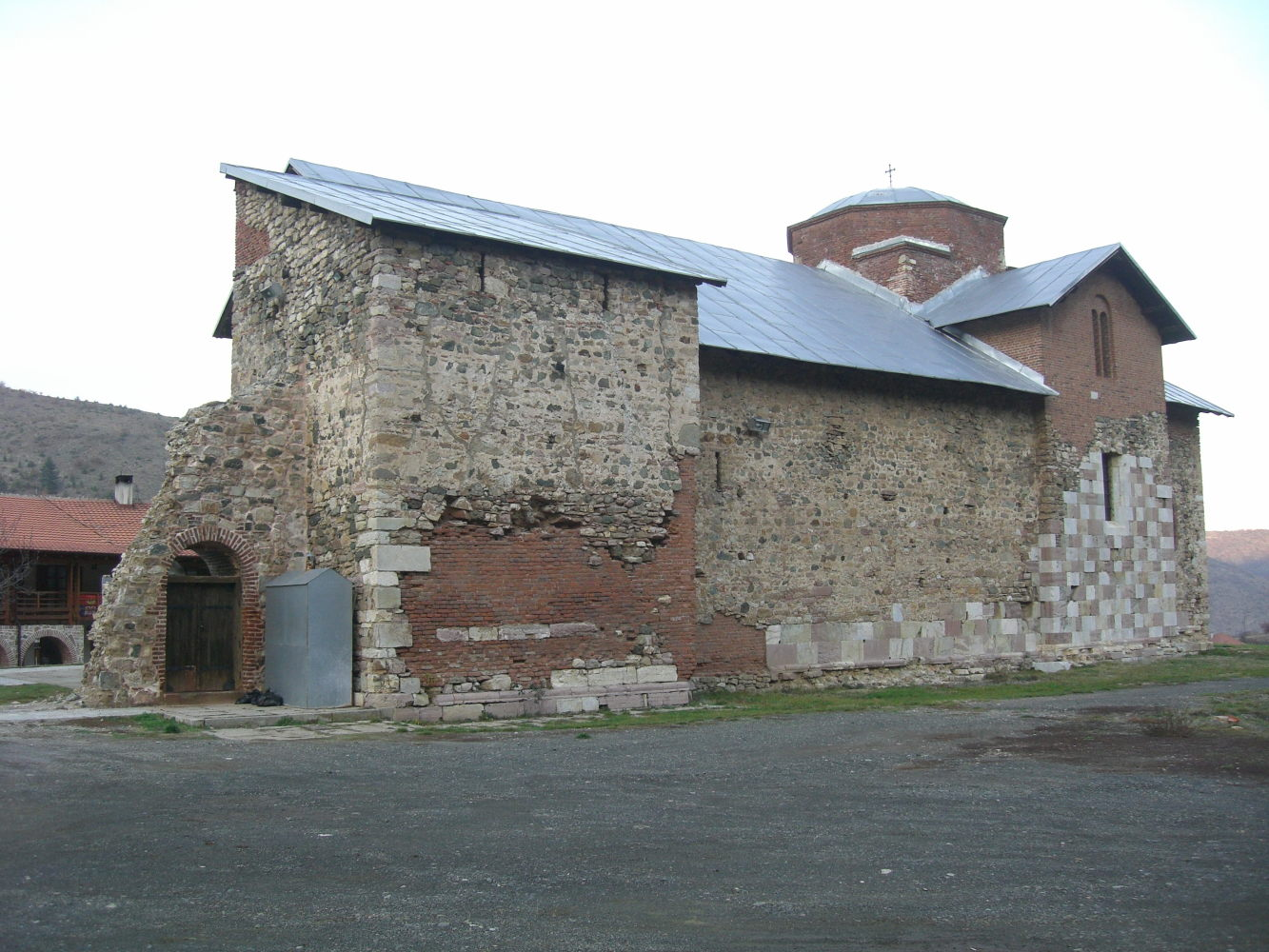
Banjska Monastery

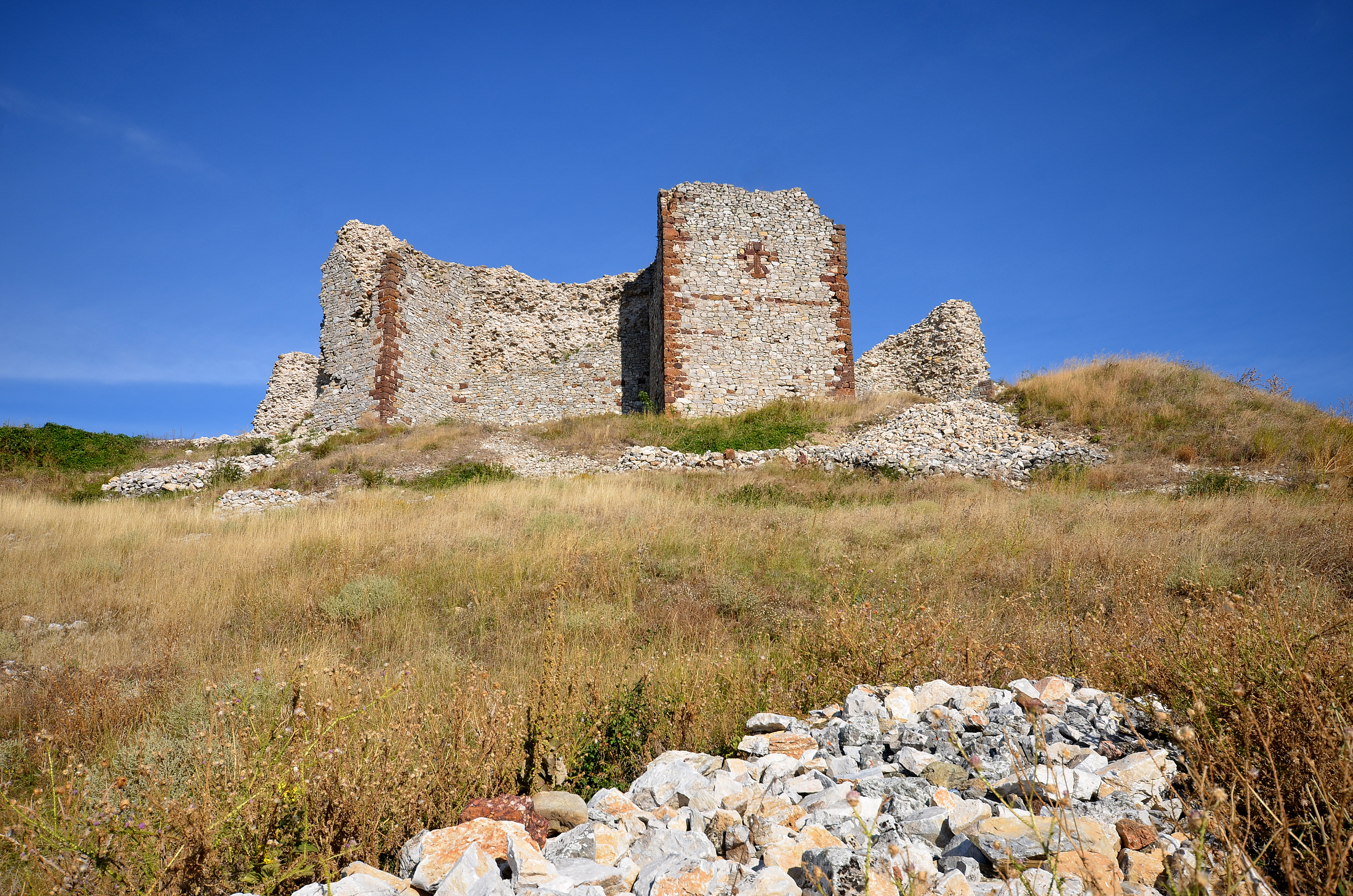
The remains of the Novo Brdo Fortress

The Banjska Monastery founded by Serbian King Stefan Milutin was burnt down following the Ottoman invasion and the monastery was looted during the Ottoman occupation of Medieval Serbia. It was damaged again during the 16th century, after which it was abandoned until a mosque was built on the ruins in the 17th century. The entire complex suffered the greatest destruction after the withdrawal of the Ottoman army from the Great Turkish War.

After the capture of Prizren and its surroundings in 1455 by the Ottoman Empire, the Monastery of the Holy Archangels founded by Serbian Emperor Stefan Dušan was looted and destroyed. At the beginning of the 17th century, a systematic demolition was conducted on the monastery churches and it is widely considered that construction material was used to build the Sinan Pasha Mosque in the same city, but such claims have not been proven.

At the close of the 17th century, the Ottoman Turks plundered the Visoki Dečani monastery, but made no serious damage. In the first half of the 18th century the Our Lady of Ljeviš in Prizren had been converted into a mosque and adjusted to the needs of services characteristic of Islam. Two monuments dedicated to the Battle of Kosovo were destroyed and removed by the Turks, including one erected by Stefan Lazarević, the Serbian Despot and son of Lazar of Serbia.

The 16th century Church of St. Nicholas in the municipality of Lipjan was pulled down in the 19th century and construction material was sold to build the Kosovo railway. The medieval Novo Brdo Fortress and the town were heavily damaged by disintegration in 1892 when the cornerstone referred to the construction of barracks in Pristina.

== World War I and II ==
During World War I, the Visoki Dečani monastery's treasures were plundered by the Austro-Hungarian Army, which occupied Serbia between 1915 and 1918.

Following the invasion of Yugoslavia (6–18 April 1941) in World War II, the largest part of Kosovo was attached to Italian occupied Albania in an enlarged "Greater Albania". During the occupation, part of the Serb population was subject to expulsion, torture, destruction of private property, destruction and damaging of monasteries, churches, cultural-historical monuments and graveyards.

The Visoki Dečani was targeted for destruction by the Albanian nationalist Balli Kombëtar and Italian fascist blackshirts in mid-1941. The Royal Italian Army responded by sending a group of soldiers to help protect the monastery from attack. Third monuments dedicated to the Battle of Kosovo were totally destroyed in 1941.

== SFR Yugoslavia ==
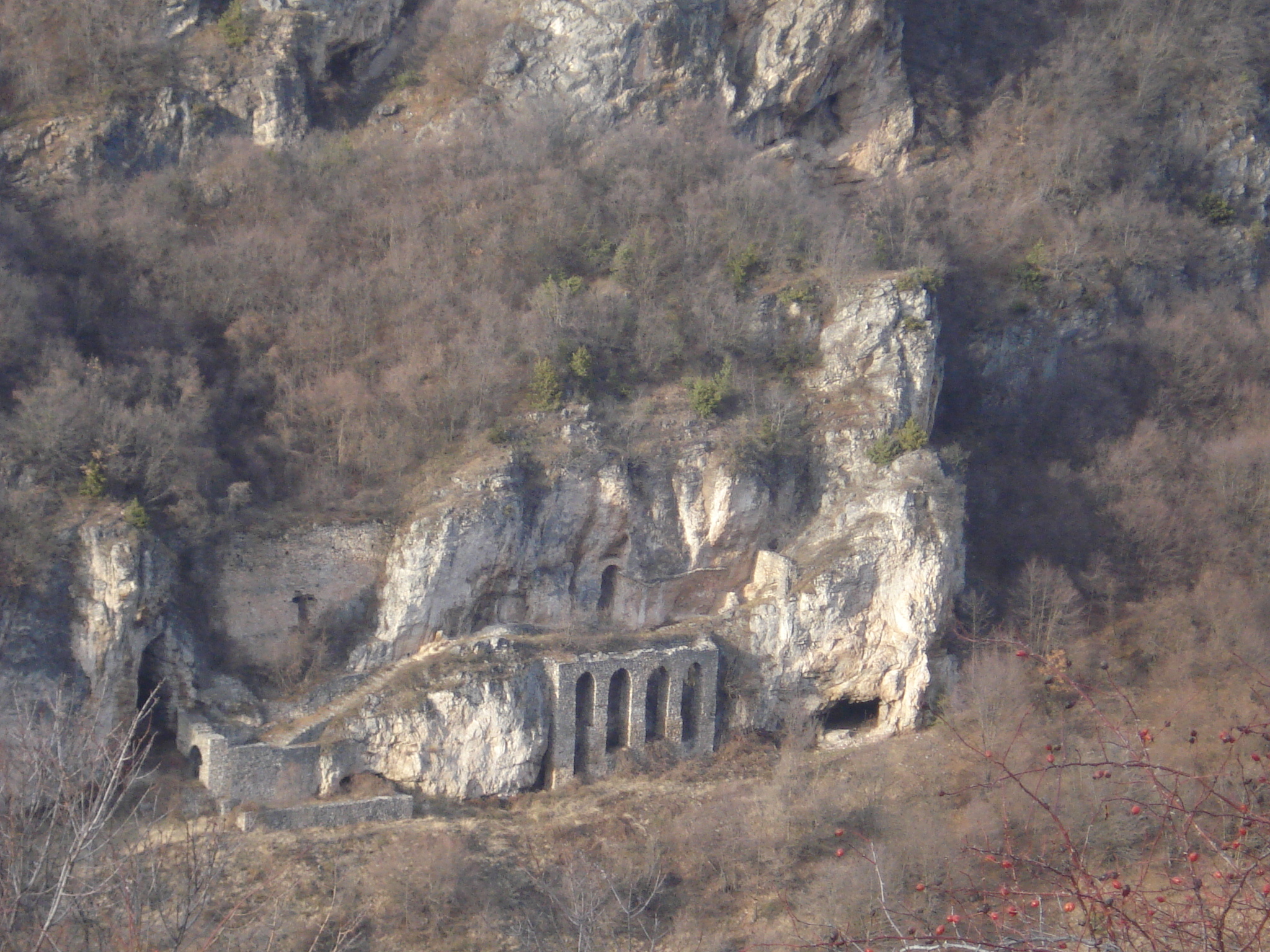
Ruins of the Hermitage of St. Peter of Koriša in Korisha village

The Orthodox Cathedral of the Holy Trinity in Gjakova was destroyed by the communists in 1949. Prior to 1968, the Yugoslav state carried out the destruction of churches, the listing of church properties as state cultural heritage, the seizure of church and monastery artifacts to be displayed in state museums, as well as, the appropriation of property for state functions. During 1968 and 1981 protests, Serbian Orthodox religious sites were the target of vandalism, while vandalism continued during the 1980s. There were attempts to devastate Devič, damage Visoki Dečani and desecrate Gračanica and the Hermitage of St. Peter of Koriša. In March 1981, the Patriarchal Monastery of Peć was set on fire, which destroyed a 2,000-square meter residential section along with valuable furniture, rare liturgical books and some of the monastery's treasury.

== Kosovo War and aftermath ==
NATO bombing in March–June 1999 resulted in the damaging of the Gračanica Monastery, Patriarchal Monastery of Peć complex of four churches, as well as the Visoki Dečani and wall paintings of the Hermitage of St. Peter of Koriša, among the more notable churches. No Serbian Orthodox churches or monasteries were damaged or destroyed by the KLA during the war. However, following the end of hostilities in June 1999, dozens of Serb Orthodox churches and monasteries were damaged in revenge attacks. In the aftermath of war, KLA fighters were accused of vandalizing Devič monastery and terrorizing the staff. KFOR troops said KLA rebels vandalized centuries-old murals and paintings in the chapel and stole two cars and all the monastery's food. Karima Bennoune, United Nations special rapporteur in the field of cultural rights, referred to the many reports of widespread attacks against churches committed by the Kosovo Liberation Army. In 2014, John Clint Williamson announced EU Special Investigative Task Force's investigative findings and he indicated that a certain element of the KLA following the conclusion of the war (June 1999) intentionally targeted minority populations with acts of persecution that also included desecration and destruction of churches and other religious sites. Fabio Maniscalco, an Italian archaeologist, specialist about the protection of cultural property, described that KLA members seized icons and liturgical ornaments as they ransacked and that they proceeded to destroy Christian Orthodox churches and monasteries with mortar bombs after the arrival of KFOR.

Within post-conflict Kosovo Albanian society, calls for retaliation for previous violence done by forces of the Slobodan Milošević regime during the war circulated through public culture. The destruction of Serbian architectural heritage was interpreted by Albanians within that post-conflict context as architecture becoming a surrogate for forces held responsible committing violence during the war needing to be avenged, in particular the Milošević government and its army. Such fabrication of interpreting architecture as unavenged violence resulted in the mediation of an idea present at the time that destruction of churches and monasteries entailed not only revenge for violence during the 1998—99 war; but also for a chain of real or imagined violent actions going far back as the medieval building of churches upon "crypto-Albanian" religious sites.

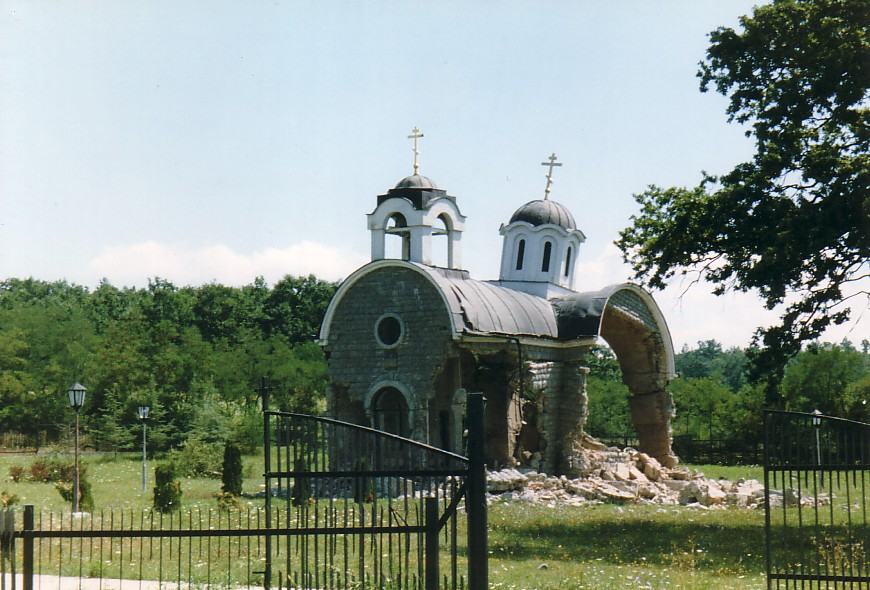
Church of Holy Trinity in Petrič village

Widespread attacks against Serbian religious sites commenced following the conflict and the return of hundreds of thousands of Kosovo Albanian refugees to their homes. Between the arrival of the Kosovo Force (KFOR) in June 1999 and the 2004 unrest in Kosovo, more than 140 holy sites were destroyed, about half of the historical ones from the 14th and 15th centuries and about half of the recently made ones. Serbenco Eduard explained that the destruction of the opponent's cultural property and cultural genocides took place in the Yugoslav wars, and that religious buildings were targeted due to the nature of the conflict. Destruction was carried out in a systematic manner. András Riedlmayer, Andrew Herscher and Tonka Kostadinova described the destruction of Serbian architectural heritage as revenge attacks. These discourses of viewing Serbian historical architecture as a surrogates of violence within Kosovo Albanian society had the effect of justifying destruction as an endless process, instead of working toward a politics of justice. Due to vandalization, the need arose for the armed force of the UN to protect locations containing Serbian religious heritage in Kosovo. On the other hand, foreign correspondent Robert Fisk criticized describing the destruction as revenge attacks. He explained that the destruction actions were planned and described them as "vandalism with a mission".

=== List of monuments damaged or destroyed in 1999 ===
- The tower of the Gazimestan memorial site was mined from the inside and bronze plaque placed on the 600th anniversary of the Battle of Kosovo were torn out.
- The monument of Stefan Dušan, Serbian Emperor in Prizren, pulled down and destroyed
- The monument of Lazar of Serbia in Gjilan, pulled down and destroyed
- The monument of Vuk Karadžić in Pristina, pulled down and destroyed
- The monument of Dositej Obradović in Pristina, pulled down and destroyed
- The monument of Petar II Petrović-Njegoš in Pristina, pulled down and destroyed
- The monument of Miloš Obilić in Obiliq, pulled down and destroyed
- The Danilović House in Loćane near Deçan (a Cultural monument of Exceptional Importance) was burned down and demolished by the Albanians.

=== List of religious buildings damaged or destroyed in 1999 ===
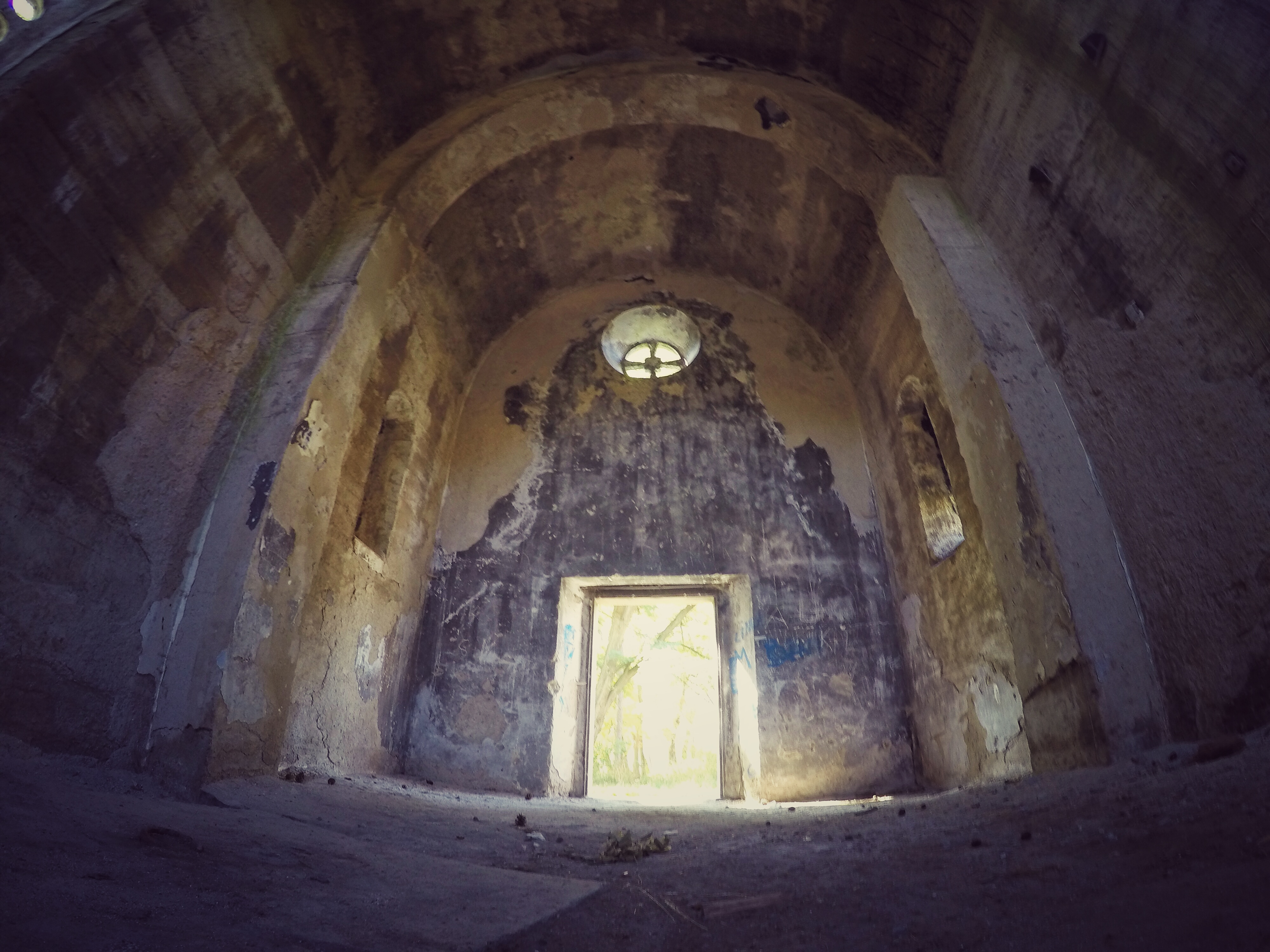
Church of St. John the Baptist in Samodreža

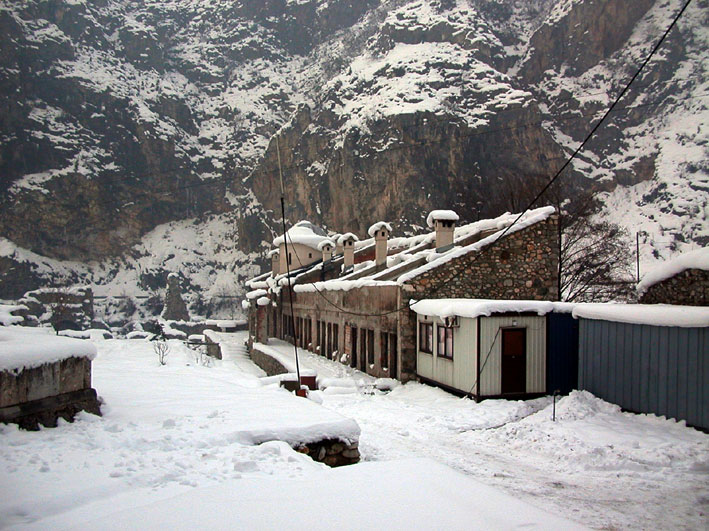
Monastery of the Holy Archangels in Prizren

- Holy Trinity Monastery in Mušutište - ''Rusinica'', (14th century), dynamited and burned down in July 1999; only the bell tower remains
- Church of the Virgin Hodegetria, Mušutište (14th century), burned down and dynamited in July 1999
- Monastery of St. Mark of Koriša in Korishë (15th century), burned down and razed to ground in July 1999
- Church of the Holy Archangels in Gornje Nerodimlje (14th century, renewed in 1700), set on fire and looted, and seriously damaged by explosive, the old cemetery desecrated
- Church of the Holy Apostles Peter and Paul, Suva Reka (built in 1938), demolished by explosive in July 1999
- Church of the Holy Apostles, Petrovac (destroyed in 1999)
- Holy Trinity Cathedral in Gjakova (originally built in 1940, renovated in 1998/99), completely destroyed by explosive on 24 July 1999
- Church of Holy Trinity, Petrič (built in 1993), completely destroyed in 1999
- Church of St. Nicholas, Slovinje (16th century), completely demolished by explosive in July 1999
- Presentation of the Virgin church in Dolac (built in 1620), completely demolished in August 1999
- Devič Monastery in Skenderaj (15th century), pillaged and torched, the tomb of St. Joanikije of Devič was desecrated in June 1999. The KFOR troops said KLA rebels vandalized centuries-old murals and paintings in the chapel.
- Church of St. Nicholas, Prizren (14th century, reconstructed in 1857), mined on 3 September and severely damaged, later renovated
- St. Archangel Gabriel's Monastery in Binač (14th century), completely destroyed by explosive on 13 December
- Church of Dormition of the Virgin (also known as the Monastery of St. Uroš) in Gornje Nerodimlje (14th century), completely destroyed in summer 1999
- Church of the Holy Virgin in Korishë (16th -17th century), church and the cemetery were destroyed in summer 1999
- Holy Trinity Church in Ratiš (built in 1922, destroyed in 1941 and reconstructed in 1992). In summer 1997 the church was set on fire and was reconstructed again. In June 1999 the church was finally mined and completely destroyed.
- Church of St Mark in Klina, heavily damaged in summer 1999
- Church of St. Nicholas in Donje Nerodimlje (built in 1983), vandalized and set on fire in July 1999
- Church of St. Stephen in Donje Nerodimlje (built in the 14th century) was demolished, burned, and destroyed by explosive by the Albanians in 1999.
- Church of the Presentation of the Blessed Virgin Mary in Belo Polje (16th century), looted and set on fire in June 1999
- Church of St. John the Baptist, Samodreža (14th century, reconstructed in 1932), vandalized and burnt in June 1999
- Church of Saint Elijah, Vučitrn (built in 1834), vandalized and looted in June 1999
- St. Eliah's Church in Bishtazhin (reconstructed in 1994), vandalized and damaged by an explosion in June 1999
- Church of Holy Trinity, Velika Reka (built in 1998), vandalized and set on fire in June 1999
- Church of the Holy Emperor Uroš in Uroševac (built in 1933), burnt in June 1999
- Parish church St. Eliah in Zhegër (built in 1931), vandalized and set on fire, local graveyard is also desecrated
- St. Elias Church in Smać (built in 1996), damaged by explosive and vandalized in July 1999
- Church of St. Paraskeva, Drsnik (built 1560/1570), interior torched in June 1999, later renovated,
- Parish church in Grmovo, near Viti, first it was set on fire and then completely destroyed by explosive.
- Church of St Nicholas in Gatnje near Ferizaj (built in 1985), looted, vandalized and seriously damaged by explosive
- Church of St. Nicolas in Kijevo, near Klina (14th century), completely destroyed by explosive. Crosses and tombstones at the cemetery were also destroyed.
- Church of St. Elijah, Podujevo (built in 1929), vandalized in July 1999
- The parish church in Novake near Prizren, vandalized and damaged
- Church of the Holy Prophet Elijah in Pomazatin (erected in 1937), roof and the interiors were burnt. Parts of it destroyed by mines.
- Church of St George, in Rudnik near Skenderaj (14th century), seriously damaged by explosive
- Church of St Archangel in Mushtisht, set on fire and partially destroyed in summer 1999
- The Church of St Parasceva, in the village of Zaskok near Ferizaj, mined and completely destroyed in summer 1999
- Church of St. Jeremiah in Grebnik (built in 1920), razed to ground and terrain leveled with bulldozers
- Church of St. George, Rečane (14th century), destroyed by explosive in June 1999
- Monastery of the Holy Archangels in Prizren (14th century), looted and devastated in June–July 1999, the 14th century Pine of Tsar Dušan was cut down and burned
- Church of the Virgin, Naklo (built in 1985), burnt and destroyed in June 1999
- Church of St. John the Baptist, Pećka Banja (built in 1998), demolished and the interiors burnt in June 1999
- Church of St. Nicholas, Đurakovac (built in the 14th century, renovated in 1592), dynamited in July 1999, large centuries old oak tree was cut into peaces and burned
- Church of the Holy Mother of God, Podgorce (consecrated in 1996), vandalized and burnt
- Church of the Holy Trinity in Babljak near Ferizaj (re-built in 1966), demolished and interior burned in 1999
- The Remains of St. Peter and Paul's Monastery in Dobra Voda near Klina (built in the 1340s) were partly demolished and desecrated by the Albanians in 1999.
- Serbian Orthodox Church of St. Nicholas in Çabiqi near Klina (built in 1435/36) was mined and completely demolished by the Albanians in 1999.
- Saint George Church in Reçan (built in the 1370s) was demolished by the Albanians in summer of 1999.

== 2004 unrest ==
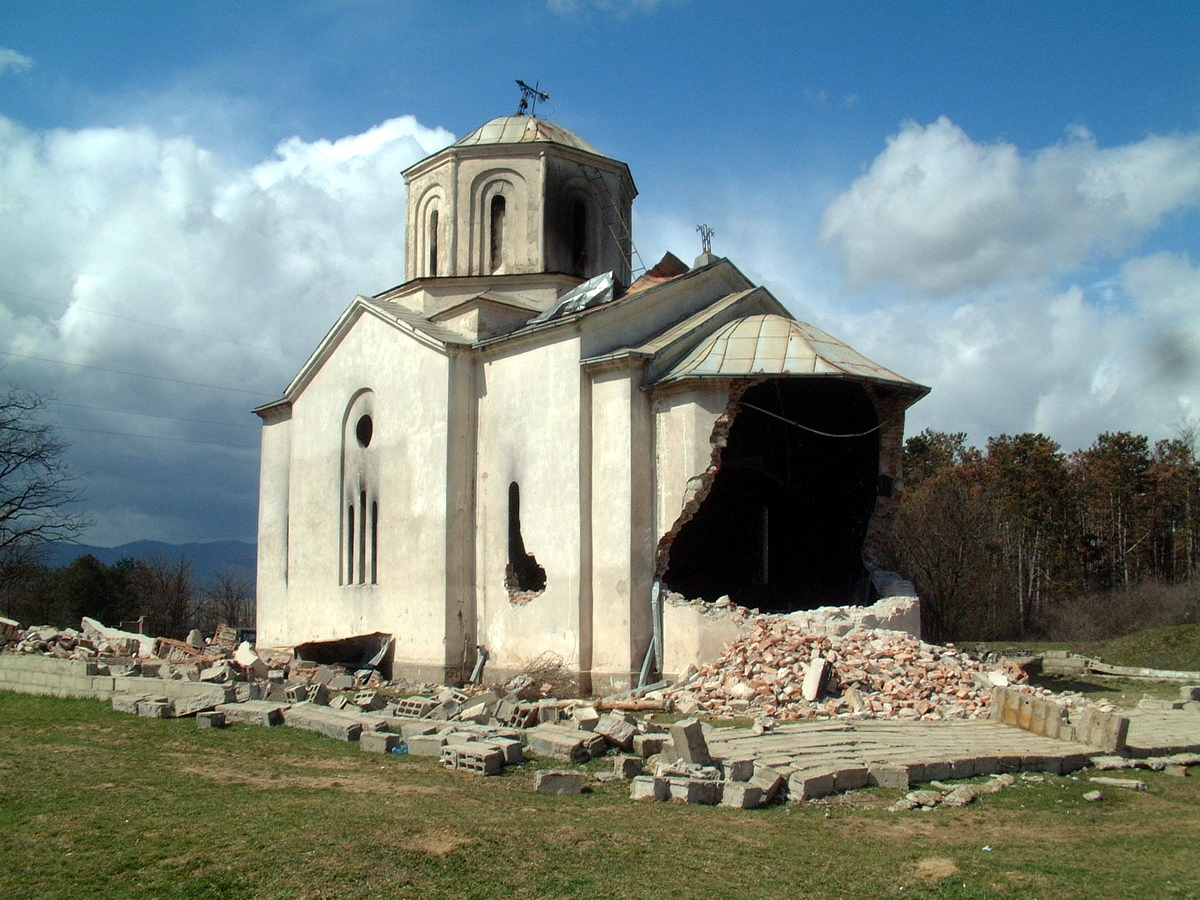
Church of St. Elijah near Podujevo

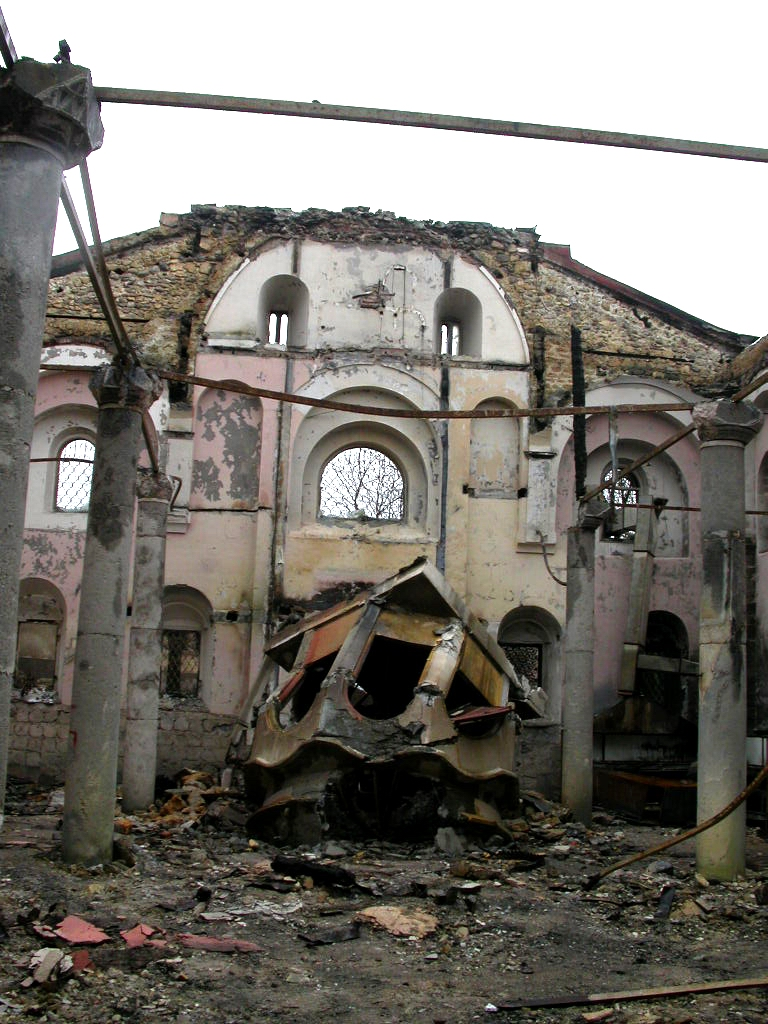
Cathedral of Saint George in Prizren

Postwar, Albanian Kosovan media, supportive of and controlled by Albanian resistance groups, induced a climate of fear among local journalists toward preventing balanced coverage of violence perpetrated by both sides. It generated a nationalist media campaign that drove and coordinated successive attacks against locations that contained Serbian heritage.

In an urgent appeal, issued on 18 March by the extraordinary session of the Expanded Convocation of the Holy Synod of Serbian Orthodox Church (SPC), it was reported that a number of Serbian churches and shrines in Kosovo had been damaged or destroyed by rioters. At least 30 sites were completely destroyed, more or less destroyed, or further destroyed (sites that had been previously destroyed). Apart from the churches and monasteries, tens of support buildings (such as parish buildings, economical buildings and residences), bringing the number close to 100 buildings of the SPC destroyed. All churches and objects of the SPC in Prizren were destroyed. The list includes several UNESCO World Heritage Sites.

The violence quickly spread to other parts of Kosovo, with Kosovo Serb communities and religious and cultural symbols attacked by crowds of Albanians. Some of these locations were ostensibly under the protection of KFOR at the time. During the riots and violence, eight Kosovo Serbians were killed. Among damaged property was the targeted cultural and architectural heritage of the Serb people, and as a result 35 churches, including 18 monuments of culture, were demolished, burnt or severely damaged.

=== List of religious buildings damaged or destroyed in 2004 ===
Site(s)	Location	History	Damage
Our Lady of Ljeviš (Bogorodica Ljeviška)	Prizren	14th c. World Heritage Site	Set on fire from the inside, 12th–14th c. frescos seriously damaged, altar area desecrated, holy table broken
Church of the Holy Saviour	Prizren	14th c.	Set on fire
Cathedral of Saint George	Prizren	Built in 1856	Set on fire and mined
Church of St. Nicholas (Tutić's Church)	Prizren	14th c.	Set on fire from the inside
Church of St. George (Runović's Church)	Prizren	16th c.	Set on fire from the inside
Church of St. Kyriaki (Crkva sv. Nedelje)	Potkaljaja neighbourhood, Prizren	14th c.	Burnt
Church of St. Panteleimon	Potkaljaja	14th c.	Burnt
Church of Sts. Cosmas and Damian	Potkaljaja	14th c.	Burnt
Church of St. Kyriaki (Crkva sv. Nedelje)	Živinjane near Prizren	-	Mined, completely destroyed by explosion
Monastery of the Holy Archangels	Prizren	14th c. founded by Stefan Dušan	Robbed and burnt, in the presence of German soldiers who failed to protect it
Serbian Orthodox Seminary of Prizren and the Bishop's Court	Prizren	Established in 1872	Set on fire and people attacked on 17 March.
Church of St. Elijah	Podujevo	built in 1929	destroyed and desecrated, coffins from the nearby Serbian cemetery were dug up, and bones of the dead were scattered away.

== Reconstruction ==
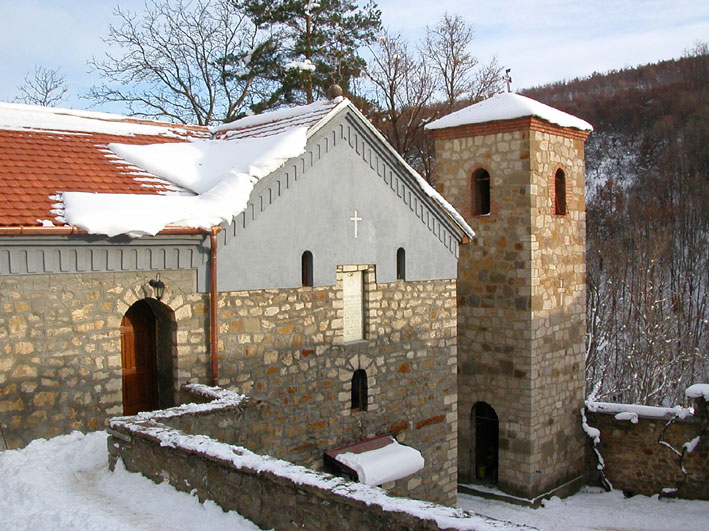
Devič Monastery reconstruction

The Reconstruction Implementation Commission (RIC) for Serbian Orthodox religious sites in Kosovo is an EU-funded project to promote the reconstruction of cultural heritage. It has 35 sites under its responsibility. The project of the revitalization of the Novo Brdo fortress was financed by the European Union and implemented by UNESCO and UNMIK.

== See also ==
- List of destroyed heritage
- Anti-Serb sentiment
- Destruction of Albanian heritage in Kosovo

== Sources ==
Books

- Bouckaert, Peter (2004). Failure to Protect: Anti-minority Violence in Kosovo, March 2004. Human Rights Watch. GGKEY:XX8XTDK4E19.
- Duijzings, Ger (2000). Religion and the Politics of Identity in Kosovo. C. Hurst & Co. Publishers. ISBN 978-1-85065-431-5.
- Ferrari, Silvio; Benzo, Andrea (2014). Between Cultural Diversity and Common Heritage: Legal and Religious Perspectives on the Sacred Places of the Mediterranean. London & New York: Routledge. ISBN 978-1-317-17503-2.
- Herscher, Andrew (2010). Violence taking place: The architecture of the Kosovo conflict. Stanford: Stanford University Press. ISBN 978-0-8047-6935-8.
- Subotić, Gojko (1998). Art of Kosovo: the sacred land. The Monacelli Press.

Government

- Светиње и културна добра уништени у мартовском погрому (PDF). =Влада Републике Србије за Косово и Метохију.
- Судбина културне баштине на Косову и Метохији (PDF). =Влада Републике Србије за Косово и Метохију.
- Уништена и оштећена културна добра на Косову и Метохији у периоду од 1999. до 2004. године (PDF). =Влада Републике Србије за Косово и Метохију.
- Угрожена културна добра на Косову и Метохији (PDF). =Влада Републике Србије за Косово и Метохију.

Journals

- Slobodan Mileusnić (27–29 May 2005). "ДУХОВНИ ГЕНОЦИД - КУЛТУРНА КАТАСТРОФА (КОНТИНУИТЕТ ЦРКВЕНОРУШИТЕЉСТВА НА КОСОВУ И У МЕТОХИЈИ)" (PDF). Срби На Косову И У Метохији. SANU. Archived from the original (PDF) on 4 March 2016.
- Ćurčić, Slobodan (2000). "Destruction of Serbian Cultural Patrimony in Kosovo: A World-Wide Precedent?". JNASSS. 14 (2): 125–31.

Other

- Avramović, S.; Rakitić, D.; Menković, M.; Vasić, V.; Fulgosi, A.; Jokić, B. (2010). The Predicament of Serbian Orthodox Holy Places in Kosovo and Metohia: Elements for a Historical, legal and Conservational Understanding (PDF). Belgrade: University of Belgrade Law Faculty. Archived from the original (PDF) on 2012-05-13.
- "Dopunjeni i ispravljeni spisak uništenih i oštećenih pravoslavnih crkava i manastira na Kosovu u toku martovskog nasilja". B92. 26 April 2004.
