= Immovable Cultural Heritage in the Peć District =

This list includes Immovable Cultural Heritage sites (as designated by the Institute for the Protection of Cultural Monuments of Serbia) in the Kosovska Mitrovica District of Serbia – which, except for not including the municipality of Orahovac, overlaps with the District of Peja and District of Gjakova of Kosovo. (Note: In 2000, the United Nations Interim Administration Mission in Kosovo implemented a redistricting of Kosovo.)tc

== Cultural monuments ==
=== Exceptional importance ===
Number in the Central Register	Picture	Name	City/Municipality	Location address	designated cultural heritage	Exceptional importance since	Comment
SK 1368		Visoki Dečani	Dečani	Dečane	25 October 1947	4 June 1990	World Heritage Site
SK 1370		Patriarchate of Peć	Peć	Peć	25 October 1947	4 June 1990	World Heritage Site
SK 1372		Terzijski Bridge	Đakovica	Bistražin	22 December 1962	4 June 1990	
SK 1376		Wooden house of Loćane (Danilović House)	Dečani	Loćane	22 May 1958	3 December 1990	Burned and destroyed by the Albanians.
SK 1377		Hadum Mosque	Đakovica	Đakovica	19 February 1955	3 December 1990	
SK 1378		Gorioč monastery	Istok	near Istok	14 July 1958	3 December 1990	
SK 1379		Bogorodica Hvostanska (Remains)	Istok	Studenica	10 July 1963	3 December 1990	
SK 1380		Serbian Orthodox Church of St. John the Baptist	Istok	Crkolez	16 April 1958	3 December 1990	
SK 1381		St. Nicholas' Serbian Orthodox Church in Đurakovac	Istok	Đurakovac	9 July 1955	3 December 1990	Burned and razed to the ground by the Albanians in 1999.
SK 1382		Remains of St. Peter and Paul's Monastery	Klina	Dobra Voda	16 April 1958	3 December 1990 (cluster "Churches in the White Drin valley")	Partly demolished and desecrated by the Albanians in 1999.
SK 1383		Serbian Orthodox Church of the Presentation of the Virgin	Klina	Dolac	16 April 1958	3 December 1990 (cluster "Churches in the White Drin valley")	In July 1999, Albanians vandalized the church and smashed the altar table to pieces. In August, the church was blown up and leveled.
SK 1384		Serbian Orthodox Church of St. Parascheva	Klina	Drsnik	16 April 1958	3 December 1990 (cluster "Churches in the White Drin valley")	After the arrival of Italian KFOR forces into the area, the church was vandalized, set on fire and seriously damaged by Albanians using explosives, in June 1999.
SK 1385		Serbian Orthodox Church of St. Nicholas	Klina	Mlečane	16 April 1958	3 December 1990 (cluster "Churches in the White Drin valley")	
SK 1386		Serbian Orthodox Church of St. Nicholas	Klina	Čabić	16 April 1958	3 December 1990 (cluster "Churches in the White Drin valley")	The church was mined and completely demolished by the Albanians in 1999.
SK 1387		Serbian Orthodox Church of St. Nicholas	Klina	Kijevo	16 April 1958	3 December 1990 (cluster "Churches in the White Drin valley")	Albanians mined the building in July 1999. The building collapsed entirely. Crosses and tombstones at the cemetery were also destroyed.
SK 1388		Serbian Orthodox Church of St. Demetrius – Donja Crkva (Lower Church)	Klina	Pograđe	16 April 1958	3 December 1990 (cluster "Churches in the White Drin valley")	
SK 1389		Gornja Crkva (Upper Church)	Klina	Pograđe	16 April 1958	3 December 1990 (cluster "Churches in the White Drin valley")	Desecrated by the Albanians in 1999.
SK 1396		Holy Transfiguration Church	Klina	Budisavci	19 February 1952	3 December 1990	
SK 1397		Bajrakli Mosque	Peć	Peć	31 December 1957	3 December 1990	
SK 1398		Serbian Orthodox Church of St. Jeremiah	Peć	Goraždevac	16 April 1958	3 December 1990	

== Cultural monuments of great importance in the Peć District ==
In addition to those deemed of exceptional importance, the Peć District contains several immovable cultural properties classified as of great importance. These include significant religious and historical sites, such as the Church of St. John in Crkolez and the Church of St. Nicholas in Đurakovac. These structures, often dating back to the medieval and Ottoman periods, provide insight into the architectural and cultural diversity of the region.

Other monuments of note include the Old Bazaar of Peć, a once-thriving commercial center reflecting the district's multicultural past, and various traditional residential buildings that illustrate regional vernacular architecture. These sites have been preserved and listed due to their historical, ethnographic, and artistic significance, contributing to the broader narrative of Kosovo's layered heritage.

=== Listed ===
ID	Monument	Address	Municipalitie	Dating	Photo
SK 1222	House of Protić in Peć	29. novembra 42.658233°N 20.292753°E	Peć		
SK 1511	Haci Ose Miftari residential tower	42.557277°N 20.302304°E	Dečani (Istinić)		
SK 1512	Iberhisaj residential tower	42.540244°N 20.288094°E	Dečani		

== See also ==
- Immovable Cultural Heritage of Exceptional Importance (Serbia)
- Immovable Cultural Heritage of Great Importance (Serbia)
- Monuments of Kosovo
