= Sherif Ahmeti =

Albanian Alim

- Title: Mufti

Personal life
- Born: 1920 Guvno Selo, Kosovo, Kingdom of Yugoslavia
- Died: April 14, 1998 (aged 77–78)
- Main interest(s): Quranic Studies, Tafsir, Aqidah

Religious life
- Religion: Islam
- Denomination: Sunni
- Jurisprudence: Hanafi
- Creed: Maturidi

Muslim leader
- Post: Mufti of Pristina
- Period in office: 1985–1990
- Influenced by: Mullah Aziz, Ahmet Gremja, Ahmet Mardoqi

Sherif Ahmeti (1920 – April 14, 1998) was a teacher, imam and commentator and translator of the Quran into Albanian.

== Early life ==
He was born in 1920 in Guvno Selo, the son of Bahtir and Aisha. His family came as Muhaxhirs from Toplica in the Sanjak of Niš. He attended kuttab with Mullah Aziz in the village of Bandulić and then with Ahmet Gremja in Ferizaj, where he studied Arabic grammar or sarf. He continued his language studies at the madrasa in Prizren, where he learned its syntax (auam), and later one in Pristina, from whence he graduated in May 1944 with his spiritual diploma (Albanian: ixhazetnamenë) from Ahmet Mardoqi. After World War II, he helped open an Albanian-language school in Lipjan, Kosovo, and he was appointed teacher in the primary school in Bandulić on December 19, 1949. In 1950, he attended a teacher training course in Peja, earning a post as director of an elementary school in Sllovi where he served until 1955. In 1956, he left the school to become imam of the mosque in Glogovce near Lipjan, soon becoming president of the local Islamic community. In 1965, he became a teacher at Alauddin Madrasa, a secondary institution in Pristina.

== Later life and work ==
Like many other Kosovar intellectuals of his era, Ahmeti worked under difficult conditions to promote linguistic and faith traditions that were intertwined, both in his promotion of them and in their persecution by the government under which he labored. From 1970 to 1984, he was principal of Alauddin Madrasa, but in 1985 he was appointed mufti of Pristina, a post he held until his retirement at the age of 70 in 1990. Since the opening of the Department of Theology at the University of Pristina, he has also been teaching aqidah there.

He also published prolifically. From 1968 to 1983, he was the editor-in-chief of the religious magazine, Buletini, later renamed Edukatës Islame. Ahmeti is also a noted translator. In 1987, after having already published an Albanian translation of the surah Ya-Sin, he published a complete Albanian Quran with commentary of which 50,000 copies were printed in Tripoli, 30,000 in Cairo, and a million in Medina. Ahmeti also wrote Komente dhe mendime islame (“Islamic Comments and Thoughts”), a 400-page volume published in Pristina in 1995 that served to reintroduce the tenets of the faith to a local audience using scholarship partially suppressed during the years of state-backed atheism.

== Legacy ==
A mosque in Lipjan bears his name.
