= Holy Trinity Monastery, Mušutište =

Serbian medieval orthodox monastery

Holy Trinity Monastery
- Location within Kosovo
- Interactive map of Holy Trinity Monastery

Monastery information
- Other name: Rusinica
- Order: Serbian Orthodox
- Established: 14th century
- Disestablished: demolished in July 1999
- Diocese: Raška and Prizren

Architecture
- Heritage designation: Cultural monument
- Designated date: 26 October 1966

Site
- Location: near Mušutište, Kosovo
- Coordinates: 42°16′46″N 20°52′27″E

The Monastery of the Holy Trinity (Serbian: Манастир Свете Тројице), also known as Rusinica (Русиница) was a medieval Serbian Orthodox monastery and a designated cultural monument located near Mušutište, Kosovo. It was completely demolished in July 1999 by Kosovo-Albanian militants.

== History ==
It was founded in the 14th century on the Rusinica hill above Mušutište, in the District of Branković, part of Medieval Serbia. The monastery's existence in written records was first dated to 1465. It was well known for its valuable collection of manuscripts dating from the 14th to the 18th century. Particularly noted were a 'Book of Commemoration' from 1465 and a hand-written Gospel from the 14th century. The monastery also treasured a collection of wooden icons from the 1800s.

In June 1999, the Monastery of Holy Trinity in Mušutište was looted by Albanian militants and in July of the same year it was completely blown up. The fire after the explosion destroyed all the buildings in the church courtyard, along with the nearby Church of the Holy Theotokos Hodigetria and the ancient manuscripts.
