= Persecution of Eastern Orthodox Christians =

The persecution of Eastern Orthodox Christians is the religious persecution which has been faced by the clergy and the adherents of the Eastern Orthodox Church. Eastern Orthodox Christians have been persecuted during various periods in the history of Christianity when they lived under the rule of non-Orthodox Christian political structures. In modern times, anti-religious political movements and regimes in some countries have held an anti-Orthodox stance.

== Catholic activities in early modern Europe ==
=== Polish–Lithuanian Commonwealth ===
Christian denominations in Polish–Lithuanian Commonwealth in 1573 (Catholics in yellow, Eastern Orthodox in green, Protestant in purple/gray)

During the end of the 16th century, under the influence of the Catholic Counter-Reformation, rising pressures towards Eastern Orthodox Christians in White Ruthenia and other eastern parts of Polish–Lithuanian Commonwealth led to the enforcement of the Union of Brest in 1595–96. Until that time, many Lytvyns and Ruthenians who lived under the rule of Polish–Lithuanian Commonwealth were Eastern Orthodox Christians. Their hierarchs gathered in synod in the city of Brest and composed 33 articles of Union, which were accepted by the Roman Catholic Church. Among their arguments was mentioning the efforts of former Metropolitan Isidore of Kiev who have sought unification of western and eastern churches. Also, in 1589 the Ecumenical Patriarch of Constantinople recognized the Russian Orthodox Church as legitimate.

At first, the Union appeared to be successful, but soon it lost much of its initial support, mainly due to its forceful implementation on the Eastern Orthodox parishes and subsequent persecution of all who did not want to accept the Union. Enforcement of the Union stirred several massive uprisings, particularly the Khmelnytskyi Uprising of the Zaporozhian Cossacks.

In 1656, Greek Orthodox Patriarch of Antioch Macarios III Zaim lamented over the atrocities committed by the Polish Catholics against followers of Eastern Orthodoxy in various parts of Ukraine. Macarios was quoted as stating that seventeen or eighteen thousand followers of Eastern Orthodoxy were killed under hands of the Catholics, and that he desired Ottoman sovereignty over Catholic subjugation, stating:

God perpetuate the empire of the Turks for ever and ever! For they take their impost, and enter no account of religion, be their subjects Christians or Nazarenes, Jews or Samaritans; whereas these accursed Poles were not content with taxes and tithes from the brethren of Christ...

== Persecution in Turkish controlled territories ==
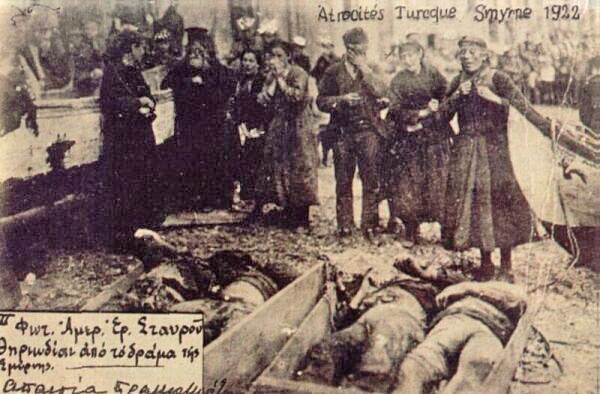
Greek civilians mourn their dead relatives, Great Fire of Smyrna, 1922

The Ottoman Empire grouped the Eastern Orthodox Christians into the Rum Millet. In tax registries, Christians were recorded as "infidels" (see giaour). After the Great Turkish War (1683–99), relations between Muslims and Christians in the European provinces of the Ottoman Empire were radicalized, gradually taking more extreme forms and resulting in occasional calls of Muslim religious leaders for expulsion or extermination of local Christians, and also Jews. As a result of the Ottoman oppression, destruction of churches and violence against the non-Muslim civilian population, Serbs and their church leaders headed by Serbian Patriarch Arsenije III sided with Habsburg Austria in 1689, and again in 1737 under Serbian Patriarch Arsenije IV, in war. In the following punitive campaigns, Ottoman forces conducted atrocities, resulting in the "Great Migrations of the Serbs". In retaliation of the Greek rebellion, Ottomans authorities orchestrated massacres of Greeks in Constantinople in 1821. During the massacre occurred mass executions, pogrom-type attacks, destruction of churches, and looting of the properties of the city's Greek population. The events culminated with the hanging of the Ecumenical Patriarch, Gregory V and the beheading of the Grand Dragoman, Konstantinos Mourouzis.

Christians were forced to pay disproportionately higher taxes than Muslims within the empire, including the humiliating poll-tax. Even pregnant mothers had to pay jizya on behalf of their unborn children.

This tax was paid by every non-Muslim male who had passed his fourteenth year, at the rate of a ducat per annum. But since Turkey had never known birth registers, the functionary whose job it was to exact the tax measured the head and neck of each boy with a piece of string and judged from that whether a person had arrived at a taxable age or not. Starting as an abuse that soon turned into an ingrained habit, then finally established custom, by the last century of Turkish rule every boy without distinction found himself summoned to pay the head tax. And it would seem this was not the only abuse. Of Ali-Pasa Stocevic, who during the first half of the nineteenth century was vizier and all but unlimited ruler of Herzegovina, his contemporary, the monk Prokopije Cokorilo, wrote that he "taxed the dead for six years after their demise" and that his tax collectors "ran their fingers over the bellies of pregnant women, saying 'you will probably have a boy, so you have to pay the poll tax right away.' The following folk saying from Bosnia reveals how taxes were exacted:"He's as fat as if he'd been tax collecting in Bosnia."

Bosnia often served as a battlefield or staging ground over the 200 years of Ottoman raids and campaigns against Hungary. Excessive taxation and conscript labor became unbearable for Christian Bosnians. "Christians therefore began to abandon their houses and plots of land situated in level country and along the roads and to retreat back into the mountains. And as they did so, moving ever higher into inaccessible regions, Muslims took over their former sites." The Christians living in towns suffered due to the Ottomans mandated restrictions to economic advancement by non-Muslims:

Islam from the very outset, excluded such activities as making wine, breeding pigs, and selling pork products from commercial production and trade. But additionally Bosnian Christians were forbidden to be saddlers, tanners, or candle-makers or to trade in honey, butter, and certain other items. Countrywide, the only legal market day was Sunday. Christians were thus deliberately faced with the choice between ignoring the precepts of their religion, keeping their shops open and working on Sundays, or alternatively, forgoing participation in the market and suffering material loss thereby. Even in 1850, in Jukic's "Wishes and Entreaties" we find him beseeching "his Imperial grace" to put an end to the regulation that Sunday be market day.

A Bosnian Muslim proverb and a song honoring and praising Sultan Bayezid II show Muslim attitudes toward the Christians:"The rayah [Christian dhimmi] is like the grass, Mow it as much as you will, still it springs up anew. Once you'd broken Bosnia's horns You mowed down what would not be pruned Leaving only the riffraff behind So there'd be someone left to serve us and grieve before the cross."

The sound of Church bells often angered Turks, and "wherever there invasions would go, down came the bells, to be destroyed or melted into cannon"

Until the second half of the nineteenth century, "nobody in Bosnia could even think of bells or bell towers." Only in 1860 did the Sarajevo priest Fra Grgo Martic manage to get permission from Topal Osman-Pasa to hang a bell at the church in Kresevo. Permission was granted, though, only on condition that "at first the bell be rung softly to let the Turks get accustomed to it little by little." And still the Muslim of Kresevo were complaining, even in 1875, to Sarajevo that "the Turkish ear and ringing bells cannot coexist in the same place at the same time"; and Muslim women would beat on their copper pots to drown out the noise....On 30 April 1872, the new Serbian Orthodox church also got a bell. But since the Muslims had threatened to riot, the military had to be called in to ensure that the ceremony might proceed undisturbed.

In 1794 the Orthodox church of Serbia warned Christians not to "sing during outings, nor in their houses, nor in other places. The saying "Don't sing too loud, this village is Turk" testifies to the fact that this part of the Kanun-i Rayah was applied outside church life as well as within."

After reviewing the martyrology of Christians killed by the Ottomans from the fall of Constantinople all the way to the final phases of the Greek War of Independence, Constantelos reports:

The Ottoman Turks condemned to death eleven Ecumenical Patriarchs of Constantinople, nearly one hundred bishops, and several thousand priests, deacons, and monks. It is impossible to say with certainty how many men of the cloth were forced to apostasize.

Constantelos concludes:"The story of the neomartyrs indicates that there was no liberty of conscience in the Ottoman Empire and that religious persecution was never absent from the state. Justice was subject to the passions of judges as well as of the crowds, and it was applied with a double standard, lenient for Muslims and harsh for Christians and others. The view that the Ottoman Turks pursued a policy of religious toleration in order to promote a fusion of the Turks with the conquered populations is not sustained by the facts."

During the Bulgarian Uprising (1876) and Russo-Turkish War (1877–78), persecution of Bulgarian Christian population was conducted by Turkish soldiers who massacred civilians, mainly in the regions of Panagurishte, Perushtitza, Bratzigovo, and Batak (see Batak massacre).

The abolition of jizya and emancipation of formerly dhimmi subjects was one of the most embittering stipulations the Ottoman Empire had to accept to end the Crimean War in 1856. Then, "for the first time since 1453, church bells were permitted to ring... in Constantinople," writes M. J. Akbar. "Many Muslims declared it a day of mourning." Indeed, because superior social standing was from the start one of the advantages of conversion to Islam, resentful Muslim mobs rioted and hounded Christians all over the empire. In 1860 up to 30,000 Christians were massacred in the Levant alone. Mark Twain recounts what took place in the levant:

They say those narrow streets ran blood for several days, and that men, women and children were butchered indiscriminately and left to rot by hundreds all through the Christian quarter... the stench was dreadful. All the Christians who could get away fled from the city, and the Mohammedans would not defile their hands by burying the 'infidel dogs.' The thirst for blood extended to the high lands of Hermon and Anti-Lebanon, and in a short time twenty-five thousand more Christians were massacred.

Edouard Engelhardt observed that during the second iteration of the Tanzimat reforms, the same problems persisted: "Muslim society has not yet broken with the prejudices which make the conquered peoples subordinate…the raya [dhimmis] remain inferior to the Osmanlis; in fact he is not rehabilitated; the fanaticism of the early days has not relented…. [Even liberal Muslims rejected]…civil and political equality, that is to say, the assimilation of the conquered with the conquerors."

during the tanzimat reforms, James Zoharb made an observation of how it was doing in Bosnia and Herzegovina which he sent to British ambassador Henry Bulwer:

The Hatti-humayoun, I can safely say, practically remains a dead letter... while [this] does not extend to permitting the Christians to be treated as they formerly were treated, is so far unbearable and unjust in that it permits the Mussulmans to despoil them with heavy exactions. False imprisonments (imprisonment under false accusation) are of daily occurrence. A Christian has but a small chance of exculpating himself when his opponent is a Mussulman (...) Christian evidence, as a rule, is still refused (...) Christians are now permitted to possess real property, but the obstacles which they meet with when they attempt to acquire it are so many and vexatious that very few have as yet dared to brave them.... Such being, generally speaking, the course pursued by the Government towards the Christians in the capital (Sarajevo) of the province where the Consular Agents of the different Powers reside and can exercise some degree of control, it may easily be guessed to what extend the Christians, in the remoter districts, suffer who are governed by Mudirs (governors) generally fanatical and un-acquainted with the (new reforms of the) law.

Roderic H. Davison explains the failure of the tanzimat reforms:

No genuine equality was ever attained...there remained among the Turks an intense Muslim feeling which could sometimes burst into an open fanaticism...More important than the possibility of fanatic outbursts, however, was the innate attitude of superiority which the Muslim Turk possessed. Islam was for him the true religion. Christianity was only a partial revelation of the truth, which Muhammad finally revealed in full; therefore Christians were not equal to Muslims in possession of truth. Islam was not only a way of worship, it was a way of life as well. It prescribed man's relations to man, as well as to God, and was the basis for society, for law, and for government. Christians were therefore inevitably considered second-class citizens in the light of religious revelation—as well as by reason of the plain fact that they had been conquered by the Ottomans. This whole Muslim outlook was often summed up in the common term gavur (or kafir), which means "unbeliever" or "infidel," with emotional and quite uncomplimentary overtones. To associate closely or on terms of equality with the gavur was dubious at best. "Familiar association with heathens and infidels is forbidden to the people of Islam," said Asim, an early nineteenth-century historian, "and friendly and intimate intercourse between two parties that are one to another as darkness and light is far from desirable."...The mere idea of equality, especially the anti-defamation clause of 1856, offended the Turks' inherent sense of the rightness of things. "Now we can't call a gavur a gavur," it was said, sometimes bitterly, sometimes in matter-of-fact explanation that under the new dispensation the plain truth could no longer be spoken openly. Could reforms be acceptable which forbade calling a spade a spade? ...The Turkish mind, conditioned by centuries of Muslim and Ottoman dominance, was not yet ready to accept any absolute equality.... Ottoman equality was not attained in the Tanzimat period [i.e., midto late nineteenth century, 1839-1876], nor yet after the Young Turk revolution of 1908.

The Greek genocide which included the Pontic genocide, was the systematic killing of the Eastern Orthodox Ottoman Greek population of Anatolia which was carried out mainly during World War I and its aftermath (1914–1922) on the basis of their religion and ethnicity. The genocide included massacres, forced deportations involving death marches through the Syrian Desert, rapes and burnings of Greek villages, forced conversions to Islam, expulsions, summary executions, and the destruction of Eastern Orthodox cultural, historical, and religious monuments.

== Interwar period ==
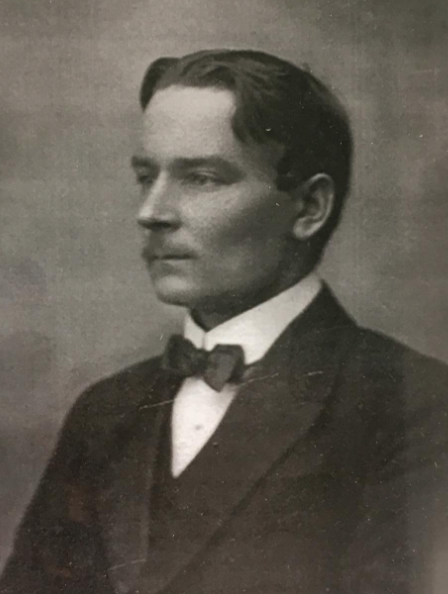
Saint Johannes Karhapää was executed for possessing an icon.

The eastern part of Poland has a long history of Catholic–Orthodox rivalry. The Roman Catholic clergy in the Chełm region in Poland was unambiguously anti-Orthodox in the interwar period. Ukraine, which has been a religious borderland, has a long history of religious conflict.

== World War II ==
=== Genocide of Serbs ===
The Croatian and clerical fascist Ustashe established the Independent State of Croatia (NDH) four days after the German invasion of Yugoslavia. Croatia was set up as an Italian protectorate. Around a third of the population was Eastern Orthodox (ethnic Serb). The Ustashe followed Nazi ideology, forced Serbs to wear armbands with "P" for pravoslavac (the Serbo-Croatian word for "Orthodox") on them like the Nazis forced Jews to wear armbands with a yellow Star of David on them, and implemented their goal of creating an ethnically pure Greater Croatia; Jews, Gypsies and Serbs were all targeted for victimization by the Ustashe's genocidal policies. The Ustashe recognized Roman Catholicism and Islam as the national religions of Croatia, but it held the position that Eastern Orthodoxy, as a symbol of Serb identity, was a dangerous foe. In the spring and summer of 1941, the genocide against Eastern Orthodox Serbs began and concentration camps like Jasenovac were constructed. Serbs were murdered and forcibly converted, in order to Croatize, and permanently destroy the Serbian Orthodox Church. The Catholic leadership in Croatia mostly supported the Ustashe actions. Eastern Orthodox bishops and priests were persecuted, arrested and tortured or killed (several hundreds) and hundreds (most) of Eastern Orthodox churches were closed, destroyed, or plundered by the Ustashe. Sometimes, the entire population of a village was locked inside the local Eastern Orthodox church and the church was immediately set alight. Hundreds of thousands of Eastern Orthodox Serbs were forced to flee from Ustashe-held territories into territory of German-occupied Serbia. It was not until the end of the war that the Serbian Orthodox Church would function again in western parts of Yugoslavia.

The persecution of Eastern Orthodox priests during World War II increased the popularity of the Eastern Orthodox Church in Serbia.

== Contemporary ==
At the Eastern Orthodox conference in Istanbul on 12–15 March 1992, the church leaders issued a statement:

After the collapse of the godless communist system that severely persecuted Orthodox Churches, we expected fraternal support or at least understanding for grave difficulties that had befallen us ... Instead, Orthodox countries have been targeted by Roman Catholic missionaries and advocates of Uniatism. These came together with Protestant fundamentalists ... and sects

=== Former Yugoslavia ===
Some Serbs viewed the Catholic leadership's support for political division along ethnic and religious lines in Croatia during the Wars in Yugoslavia, and support for the Albanian cause in Kosovo as anti-Serb and anti-Orthodox. Yugoslav propaganda during the Milošević regime portrayed Croatia and Slovenia as part of an anti-Orthodox "Catholic alliance".

==== Kosovo ====
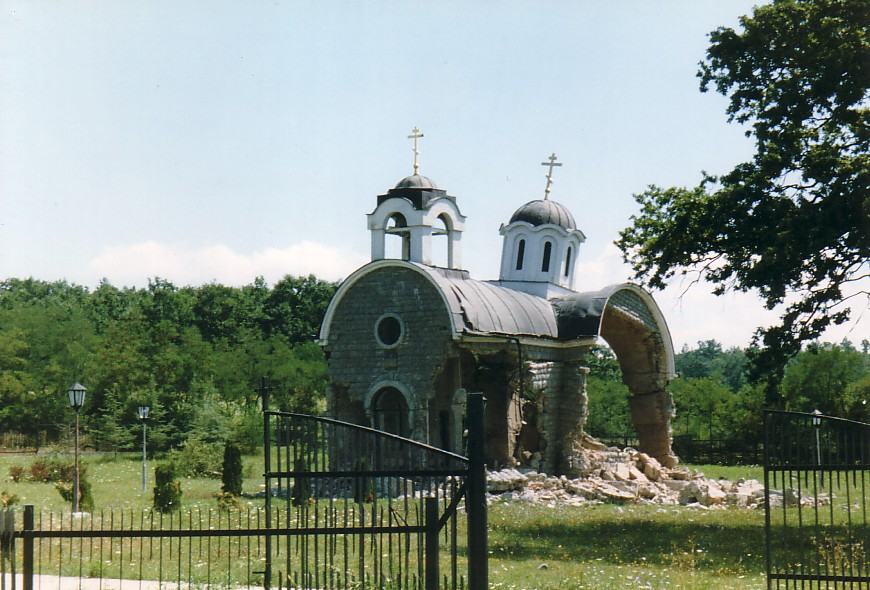
Destroyed Serbian Orthodox Holy Trinity Church in Petrić village

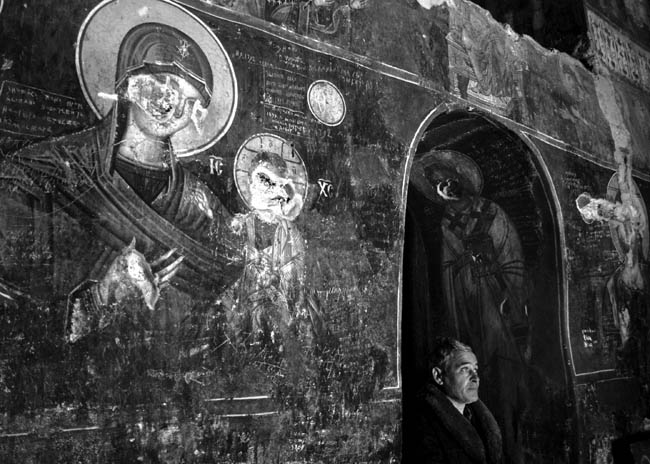
Ruined medieval Serbian Orthodox monastery

Observers described that Orthodox ethnic Serbs of Kosovo have been persecuted since the 1990s. Most of the Serbian population were expelled following ethnic cleansing campaigns and many of thеm were victims of massacres and captured in camps. Heritage from the medieval Serbian state and Serbian Archbishops period, including World Heritage Site, is widespread throughout Kosovo, and many of them were targeted in the aftermath of the 1999 war.

Karima Bennoune, United Nations special rapporteur in the field of cultural rights, referred to the many reports of widespread attacks against churches committed by Kosovo Liberation Army (KLA). She also pointed out the fears of monks and nuns for their safety. John Clint Williamson announced EU Special Investigative Task Force's investigative findings and he indicated that a certain element of the KLA intentionally targeted minority populations with acts of persecution that also included desecration and destruction of churches and other religious sites. According to the International Center for Transitional Justice, 155 Serbian Orthodox churches and monasteries were destroyed by Kosovo Albanians between June 1999 and March 2004. World Heritage Site consisting of four Serbian Orthodox Christian churches and monasteries were inscribed on the List of World Heritage in Danger.

Numerous human rights reports have consistently pointed to social antipathy towards Serbs and the Serbian Orthodox Church, as well as discrimination and abuse. In the annual International Religious Freedom Report, the State Department wrote that the municipal officials continued to refuse to implement a 2016 Constitutional Court decision upholding the Supreme Court's 2012 ruling recognizing the Visoki Dečani monastery's ownership of land. Displaced Serbs are often barred from attending annual pilgrimage for security reasons because of protests by Kosovo Albanians in front of the Orthodox churches. The Minority Rights Group International reported that Kosovo Serbs lack physical security and consequently freedom of movement, as well as they have no possibility to practice their Christian Orthodox religion.

== See also ==
- Anti-Catholicism
- Anti-Mormonism
- Anti-Protestantism
- Byzantine Iconoclasm
- Persecution of Christians
- Persecution of Christians in the post–Cold War era
- Persecution of Jehovah's Witnesses
- Sectarian violence among Christians
