= History of Ferizaj =

Ferizaj, the fifth largest city in Kosovo, has been populated since the pre-historic era.

== Early history ==
The oldest ethno-cultural group to live in the territory making up modern-day Kosovo was the Starčevo culture, who lived there in the 6th and 5th millennia BC. Members of this group constructed their homes out of willows and mud near rivers and river terraces. Their main profession was plowing and farming.

Around 4300 BC, the Vinča culture took the place of the Starčevo culture. Their settlements of dense rows of willows and mud houses were built near rivers. Remnants of their material culture are mostly ceramic vessels and baked clay figures. The Bubanj-Hum culture, an eneolithic culture, followed. This cultural group expanded westward from what is now Bulgaria. When this ethno-cultural group reached the region before the end of the 6th millennium BC, they destroyed Vinča settlements. Remnants of their material culture have not survived. After Bubanj-Hum, the Baden culture arrived from the Danube river, representing its southernmost influence in Kosovo. Baden culture ended before the end of the 3rd millennium BC.

From the 2nd to 1st millennium BC, present in a large part of Central and Southern Europe, there was a discovered culture of ashes of the dead being burned and placed with different items in a large clay pot, and then buried in the ground. The urn was accidentally discovered in Varosh. From the mid-8th century BC to the Roman conquest of the region, a culture of the Dardani developed. The Dardani burned the dead and buried their remnants in tumuli tombs. In Ferizaj, two such necropolises have been found, one in the locality of Kuline, near Gërlicë, and the other in Mollopolc, along the Ferizaj-Shtime road. In 96 BC, Roman Emperor Sulla subdued the Dardani. Numerous Roman settlements were established across the valley. These settlements also accompanied a road network, connecting cities such as Ulpiana and Skopje, passing through Ferizaj and the gorge of Kaçanik.

== Conflict period ==
=== Under the Ottoman Empire ===
In the 1455 census conducted by the Ottoman authorities in the province of Branković, 646 villages of this province's villages of Ferizaj were larger than others. About 90% of the population were of Slavic origin, 10% Albanians, Vlachs, Greeks, and Bulgarians. Agriculture was the basic source of income in these villages. Ferizaj became a city with about 400 houses and 200 shops. The oldest school was Nerodime school. In July 1908 in Ferizaj, the Albanian forces that were led by Idriz Seferi and Isa Boletini gathered to put pressure on Skopje. When negotiations failed, on August 12, Albanian forces from Pristina and Ferizaj took control of Skopje.

=== Balkan War ===
When the Balkan War started in 1912, as Serbian forces tried to expand their control over Ottoman-held territories, Ferizaj was appointed the Third Army of the Serbian Army under the command of general Božidar Janković. On the night of 23/24 October, the order from the Army lll of the Serbian Army was given to march towards Skopje and Kumanovo. The group was decided to be in two columns; it was composed of the Division of Morava Call II and cavalry of the army, which was tasked with conducting permeation in Lipljan, Ferizaj and Kaçanik towards Skopje.

On October 24, the vanguard cavalry sets off for Ferizaj. Upon entering the city, the diversion of vanguard occupied the post, municipal building, railway station and army barracks. Ottoman Army units and organized groups of armed Albanians departed to Ferizaj. The eskadron vanguard in the northern hill of Ferizaj was attacked. The main part of the Morava Division was ordered to accelerate towards the Jerli Prelez and Sazli villages.

=== Structures ===
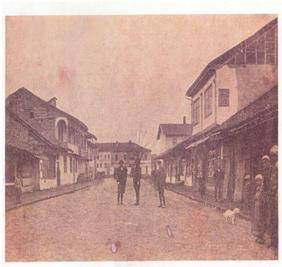
Old picture of Ferizaj

During this time, the municipal governing bodies were composed of the Mayor, the village leader and the officer. Communities of cities formed the Municipal Council. Governing bodies and the court were appointed for one year. On October 17, 1912, it was formed that Ferizaj, as an administrative-territorial unit, was part of the district of Pristina. The decision was proposed by Milorad Ant. Vujičić, who was inspector of police; it was implemented by the Supreme Command of Vranje. Ferizaj in 1914 exported wheat, barley and oats. While in Ferizaj, they also exported corn, beans and leather.

On October 24, 1912, the railroad Skopje–Mitrovica, which had been damaged by the Turks, was adjusted. After General Božidar Janković travelled to the first train released on November 3, the name of Hani i Elezit was changed to General Janković.

According to statistics made on April 4, 1913, Ferizaj had 71 villages organized in 10 municipalities. 4897 houses and 32,789 people (16,417 women and 16,372 men) were recorded. The leader of the Pristina District no. 3133 reported the number of residents in Ferizaj was 32,802, while only the locality of Ferizaj had 3,405 inhabitants. The Orthodox were 8694, Catholics were 34, and Islamic were Albanians 23,454 and Roma 416.

Throughout 1913, Ferizaj was recognized as the county town under Pristina and was recognized by the name Ferizaj. By decision of the Ministerial Council of the Kingdom of Serbia on January 16, 1914, that entered into force by Serbian Law of June 16, 1886, the name was changed from Ferizaj in Uroševac. The town of Ferizaj numbered 3405 inhabitants. Under this law, the Circle of Nerodime was part of the district of Kosovo.

== During world wars ==
=== First World War ===
The beginning of the First World War found Kosovo separated between Serbia and Montenegro. In October 1915, Bulgaria entered into the war, and it had military developments in the Ferizaj area that was part of the main artery connecting Kumanovo and Skopje with Kosovo. The Serbo-Montenegrin forces during this period were determined in Ferizaj. During this period, there was only one Albanian private school that was allowed by the Austro-Hungarian Monarchy, which was in a Catholic church near Ferizaj. During this period, many settlements' names were added the Bulgarian suffixes of -ov, -ev, and -ova. Based on this, they named Ferizaj as Ferizovo.

=== Interwar period ===
In late October 1918, the French army and Serbian representatives arrived in the town to establish Serbian control. The Serbian government was established on October 31, 1918, and Ferizaj was appointed temporarily under the Deputy Prefect of the Nerodimlje District. Between the two world wars, almost all goods went through Ferizaj. According to 1937 evidence, Nerodime had 23 schools, whose teachings followed 3,063 students.

=== Second World War ===
In early 1941, the Communist Party's leading bodies in Ferizaj tried to get residents to join the National Liberation Movement. This movement resulted in the liberation of the country and eventually came to the liberation of the city on December 2, 1944. After the city bombing on 7 April 1941 by German aerials, on the occasion of withdrawal by November 16, 1944, the city's railway stations, tunnels and bridges in Ferizaj–Skopje road were also destroyed. Road and rail traffic was rebuilt in the next three months with volunteer work. Ferizaj, for the first time, elected members of the municipal chamber. In 1960–1966, most of Štimlje and the municipality of Štrpce joined the territory of this municipality.

On November 17, 1944, Ferizaj was liberated. The city had 4000 inhabitants, of which 2/3 were Albanian. The National Liberation Council became legal after the liberation of the city; it had 17 members. Military units were also formed: the Command of Country on November 18, 1944, and immediately the Command of the Region Military, which included the National Liberation Council in Nerodime districts, the Kaçanik, Vitina, Gjilan and Kamenica.

== Later history ==
The founding of the city of Ferizaj came as a result of the construction of the railway line Mitrovica–Skopje that was completed in 1973. Construction of this railway was financed by Turkey, while the design and execution of works were made by the French. In the same year, the city received the denomination of Ferizaj. The city designation is based on the first caravanserai in the township of Feriz Shasivari.

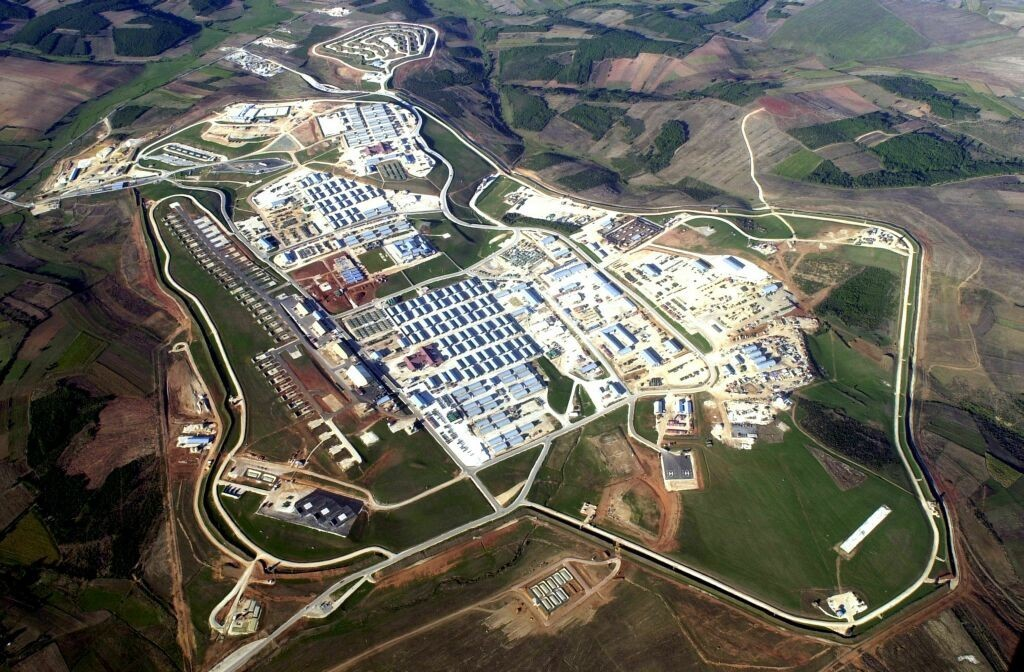
Camp Bondsteel Kosovo

In 1999, during the Kosovo War, the city of Ferizaj was damaged by the Serbian army that shelled and burned the neighborhoods. In March 1999, 7000–9000 children were poisoned in schools, some being residents of Ferizaj.
