= Church of St John the Baptist, Samodreža =

Serbian Orthodox Church in Kosovo

The Church of St John the Baptist Црква светог Јована Претече Crkva Svetog Jovana Preteče Kisha e Shna Gjonit
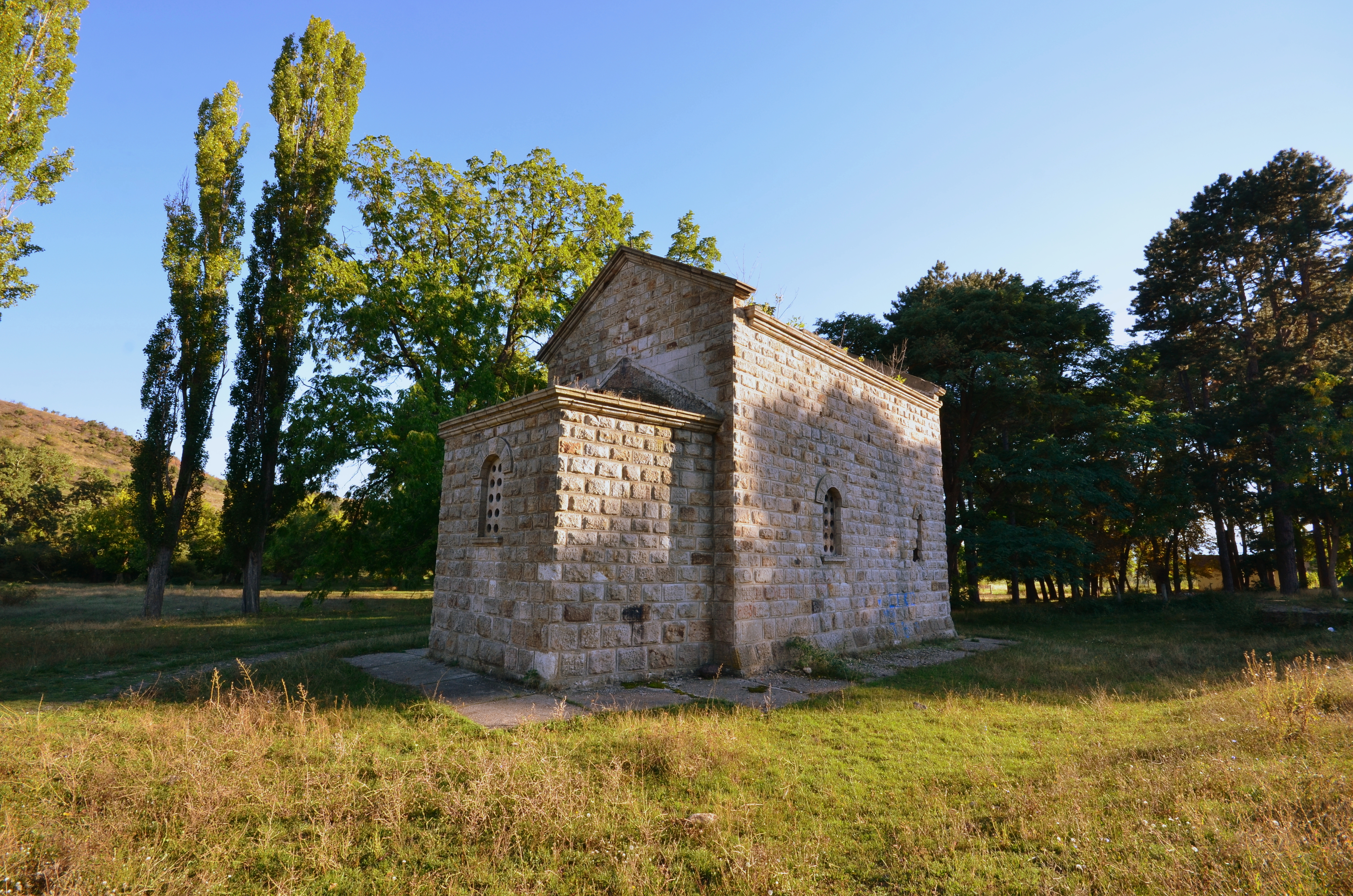
- The Church of St John the Baptist

Religion
- Affiliation: Serbian Orthodox
- Year consecrated: 14th century / 1932

Location
- Location: Samodreža, Kosovo
- Interactive map of The Church of St John the Baptist; Црква светог Јована Претече; Crkva Svetog Jovana Preteče; Kisha e Shna Gjonit
- Coordinates: 42°49′27″N 21°02′59″E

Architecture
- Cultural Heritage of Serbia
- Official name: Crkva Sv. Lazara
- Type: Monument of Culture
- Designated: 29 May 1964

The Church of St John the Baptist (Serbian: Црква Светог Јована Претече, romanized: Crkva Svetog Jovana Preteče) also known as the Church of St. Lazar (Serbian: Црква Св. Лазара, Crkva Sv. Lazara, Albanian: Kisha e Shën Llazarit) in Samodreža, six kilometers east of Vushtrri, Kosovo, is a Serbian Orthodox Church dedicated to the Beheading of St John the Baptist. The church mentioned in the Serbian tradition as the location where the army of Prince Lazar gathered for the Battle of Kosovo (1389). The current building was built in 1932 and was heavily damaged during the Kosovo War and 2004 unrest.

== History ==
According to tradition (included in the Tronoša Chronicle), before the famous Battle of Kosovo (1389), the troops of Prince Lazar gathered and held a holy communion in the Samodreža Church. Tradition further holds that Miloš Obilić, the assassin of the Murad I, was buried in the church after the battle.

The Church was desecrated and destroyed many times throughout its long history. In year of 1932, the church was rebuilt under the joint project of famous Serbian architects Petar Popović and Aleksandar Deroko. It was made of white marble hewn stone with purified forms and clear lines, with almost complete absence of decorations. During the works on the renovation of the church, nearby were found skeletons which were presumed to belong to the victims of the Battle of Kosovo.

At the end of June 1999, after the withdrawal of Yugoslav security forces and the arrival of French KFOR forces in the area, the church in Samodreža was vandalized and burned by Albanians. The church was targeted again during the 2004 unrest. The church's roof was destroyed, over the apse there is a large hole, glass windows and doors are broken, the bell tower and the wall around the church were destroyed (only the bell has been preserved and it is located in Zvečan). The interior has been turned into a rubbish dump and a toilet for people and livestock.

== See also ==
- Destroyed Serbian heritage in Kosovo

== Sources ==
- "Crkva Sv. Lazara". Serbian Academy of Sciences and Arts. 2006.
