= Binač Monastery =

Serbian Orthodox monastery near Viti, Kosovo

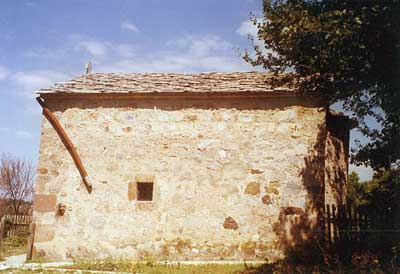
- Binač Monastery
- Denomination: Serbian Orthodox

Architecture
- Years built: 14th century

Monastery of The Saint Archangels Michael and Gabriel (Serbian Cyrillic: Манастир Светих архангела Михаила и Гаврила/Manastir Svetih arhangela Mihaila i Gavrila), also known as Binač Monastery (Манастир Бинач/Manastir Binač), or Buzovik (Бузовик), was a Serbian medieval Eastern Orthodox monastery, built in the 14th century. The church had a rectangular foundation, a semi-round apse and a semi-cylindrical vault. There were two layers of frescoes, one on top of the other. The newer layer, from the 16th century, showed archbishops at liturgy.

It was located near the town of Viti. The monastery was destroyed in June 1999, by Albanians.

== See also ==
- List of Serbian Orthodox monasteries
- Destruction of Serbian heritage in Kosovo
