= Church of St. Nicholas, Đurakovac =

Church in Đurakovac, Kosovo

Coordinates: 42.7170°N 20.4725°E

Church of St. Nicholas
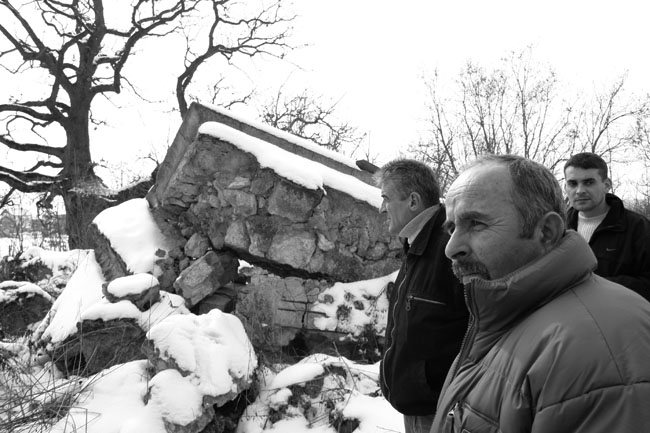
- Destroyed Church of St. Nicholas in Đurakovac

Religion
- Affiliation: Serbian Orthodox
- Year consecrated: 1592

Location
- Location: Đurakovac, Kosovo
- Interactive map of Church of St. Nicholas

Architecture
- Cultural Heritage of Serbia
- Official name: St. Nicholas' Serbian Orthodox Church in Đurakovac
- Type: Cultural monument of Exceptional Importance
- Designated: 9 July 1955
- Reference no.: SK 1381

Church of St. Nicholas (Serbian: Црква Светог Николе у Ђураковцу, romanized: Crkva Svetog Nikole u Đurakovacu; Albanian: Kisha e Shën Nikollë Gjurakut) was a Serbian Orthodox church located in the village of Đurakovac in the municipality of Istok, in Kosovo. It was built on the foundations of an older building from the 14th century, and completely rebuilt in 1592 by the villagers, led by the priest Cvetko. The church belongs to the Eparchy of Raška and Prizren of the Serbian Orthodox Church and is registered as a Cultural Heritage of Serbia.

The church in Đurakovac was a single-nave building of modest dimensions, constructed by roughly cut quarry stone and limestone. The roof was covered with stone slabs and the average frescoes, painted by "sinful zograph Milija". The frescoes were restored in 1863. The church was much like those in the valley of the White Drin and represented a rare combination of stone and wood.

After the arrival of the Italian KFOR troops, the church was damaged, dynamited and demolished in July 1999 by Kosovo Albanians. The royal doors and two icons of the iconostasis, were lifted from the debris, and kept in the Patriarchal Monastery of Peć.

== See also ==
- Destruction of Serbian heritage in Kosovo
