= Church of St. Nicholas, Slovinje =

Serbian Orthodox church in Lipjan, Kosovo

Church of St. Nicholas Црква Светог Николе Kisha e Shën Kollës

Religion
- Affiliation: Serbian Orthodox
- Year consecrated: 16th century / 1996

Location
- Location: Sllovi, Kosovo

Architecture
- Demolished: 19th century / 1999
- Cultural Heritage of Serbia
- Official name: Crkva Sv. Nikole
- Type: Monument of Culture
- Designated: 24 January 1967

Church of St. Nicholas (Serbian: Црква Светог Николе / Crkva Svetog Nikole; Albanian: Kisha e Shën Kollës) was a Serbian Orthodox church located in Sllovi, in the municipality of Lipjan, Kosovo. The church was built in 16th century, demolished in 19th century, and rebuilt in 1996. It was again completely demolished during the Kosovo War in 1999.

== History ==
The church, dedicated to Saint Nicholas, was built in the 16th century.

The church was rebuilt in 1996. After the arrival of the British KFOR troops in June 1999, the church was again demolished during the war. On 17 July 1999, the church was dynamited and razed to the ground.

== Sources ==
- "Crkva Sv. Nikole". Serbian Academy of Sciences and Arts. 2006.
