= Church of the Presentation of the Theotokos, Belo Polje =

Serbian Orthodox church in Kosovo

Church of the Presentation of the Theotokos Црква Ваведење Пресвете Богородице

Religion
- Affiliation: Serbian Orthodox
- Year consecrated: 1868

Location
- Location: Belo Polje, Kosovo

Architecture
- Cultural Heritage of Serbia
- Official name: Crkva Svete Bogorodice
- Type: Monument of Culture
- Designated: 31 December 1964

Church of the Presentation of the Theotokos (Serbian: Црква Ваведење Пресвете Богородице, Crkva Vavedenje Presvete Bogorodice; Albanian: Kisha e Zojës së Bekuar) was a Serbian Orthodox Church located in the village of Belo Polje, in the municipality of Peja, Kosovo and Metohija.

== History and location ==
The church in Belo Polje was dedicated to the Presentation of the Virgin and was located at the foot of the mountain range Pleš-Koprivnik, on the right side of the small river Kamenica-Sušica, south of the town Peja. In the Charter of Stefan of Dečani from the 14th century there is a source claiming that on that place once stood the original church. There is also a marble tombstone with an inscription from the 14th century, subsequently incorporated into the floor of the church.

The older church was violated during the Turkish occupation of the area. A newer, current, is built with the material support of Russian Empress Maria Alexandrovna in the period 1866–1868. Its construction is supported by the efforts of Dečani Archimandrite Kiril Andrejević, residents of the city and esnaf associations from Peć and Skadar.

== The destruction of the church in 1999 ==
The church and the village were burned down in 1999, windows shattered, furniture, iconostasis and liturgical items broken. The doors were damaged on both sides. On this time, murals suffered the greatest damage, now covered with a thick layer of soot and grime. The church was partially restored at the end of 2003, but in March 2004 the church and the village were burned again.

== See also ==
- Destroyed Serbian heritage in Kosovo

== Sources ==
- "Crkva Svete Bogorodice". Serbian Academy of Sciences and Arts. 2006.
