= Church of St. Nicholas, Prizren =

Serbian Orthodox church in Prizren, Kosovo

Church of St. Nicholas
- Црква светог Николе
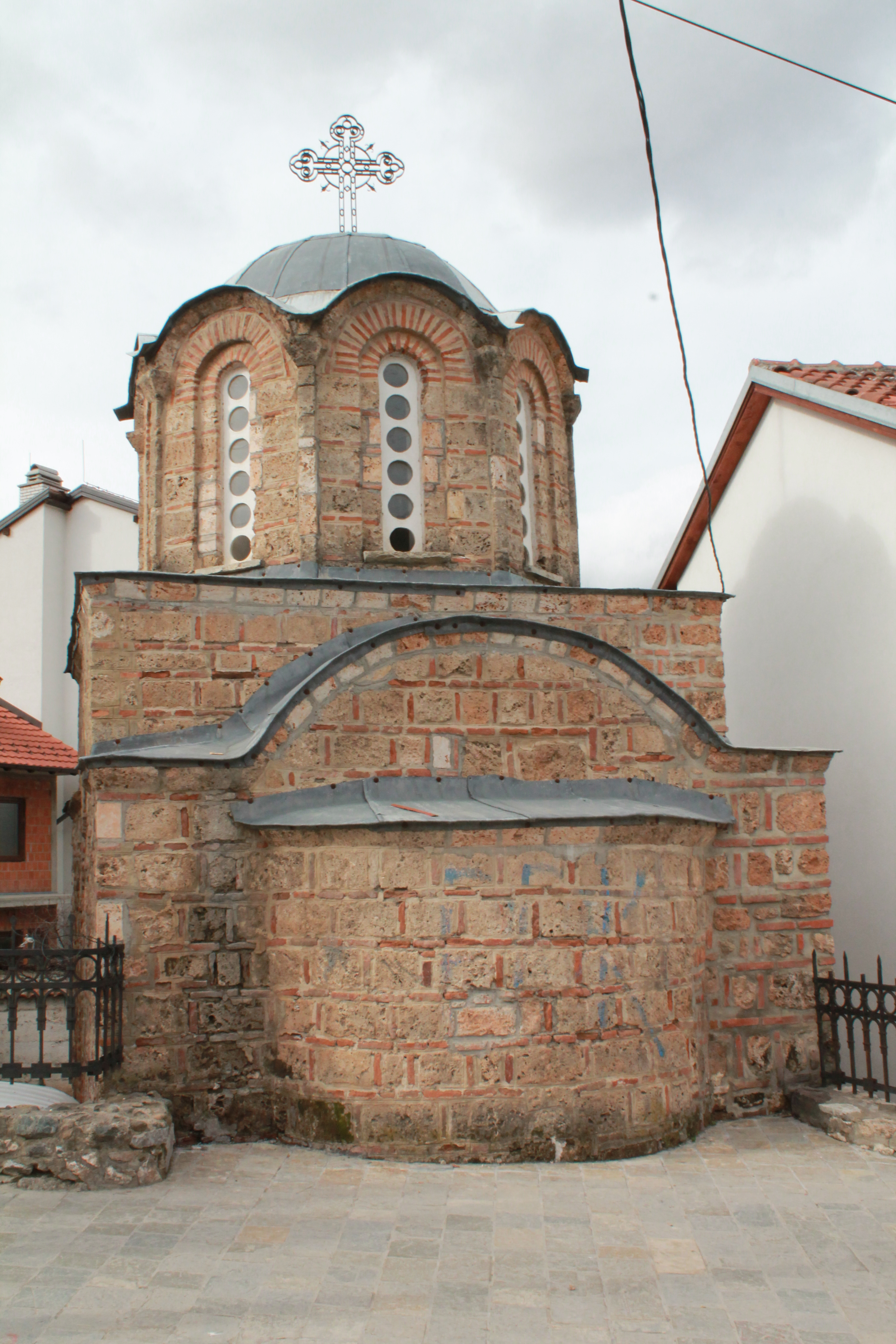
- St Nicholas Church
- Church of St. Nicholas
- 42°12′30″N 20°44′22″E
- Location: Prizren, Kosovo
- Denomination: Serbian Orthodox Church

History
- Status: Church
- Founded: 1331
- Founder: Dragoslav Tutić
- Dedication: St. Nicholas

Architecture
- Functional status: vandalized and closed
- Heritage designation: Monument of Culture of Exceptional Importance
- Designated: 1990
- Closed: 2004: vandalized

Administration
- Diocese: Eparchy of Raška and Prizren

The Church of St. Nicholas (Serbian: Црква светог Николе/Crkva Svetog Nikole; Albanian: Kisha e Shën Nikollës Tutiqëve), also known as Tutić Church (Tutićeva crkva) is a Serbian Orthodox church located in Prizren in Kosovo. It was founded in 1331–1332 by Dragoslav Tutić, whose monastic name was Nikola (Nicholas), and his wife Bela. Later, the church became a possession of the Visoki Dečani Monastery. Since 1990, it has been on Serbia's list of Monuments of Culture of Exceptional Importance. At the time of the 2004 unrest in Kosovo, the church was vandalized. Since 2005, with financial support from the European Union, work has been undertaken to restore the church to its original state.

== Architecture ==
The church of St. Nicholas is a small stone and brick single-nave church, with a central octagonal dome, reconstructed at the end of the 1970s. The altar apse is semicircular, with semicircular niches for diaconicon and proskomedia. The builder's inscription is only partially preserved but 19th century manuscripts indicate that the church was built in 1331-1332.

== Frescoes ==
The frescoes in the church are preserved to a degree and are assumed to have been introduced immediately after the church's construction. Based on their style, theme and layout, they are thought to have been painted by the group of painters behind the oldest painting in St. Saviour Church, Prizren and the frescoes in the church of St. George in Rečani near Suva Reka, destroyed in mid-1999.

== See also ==
- Monuments of Culture of Exceptional Importance
- Prizren
