= Church of the Virgin, Naklo =

Serbian Orthodox Church in Peć, Kosovo

Church of the Virgin Богородичина црква у Наклу Kisha e Virgjëreshës në Nakëll

Religion
- Affiliation: Serbian Orthodox
- Year consecrated: 1985

Location
- Location: Naklo, Kosovo

Church of the Virgin was a Serbian Orthodox Church located in the village of Naklo, in the municipality of Peć, in Kosovo. It was built in 1985 and it belonged to the Diocese of Raška and Prizren of the Serbian Orthodox Church. After the arrival of the Italian KFOR troops in 1999, the church was demolished and burned by the Albanians.
