= Church of St. Stephen, Donje Nerodimlje =

Church in Nerodimë e Poshtme, Kosovo

Church of St. Stephen, Donje Nerodimlje Kisha e Shën Shtjefënit, Nerodimë e Poshtme Црква Светог Стефана, Доње Неродимље
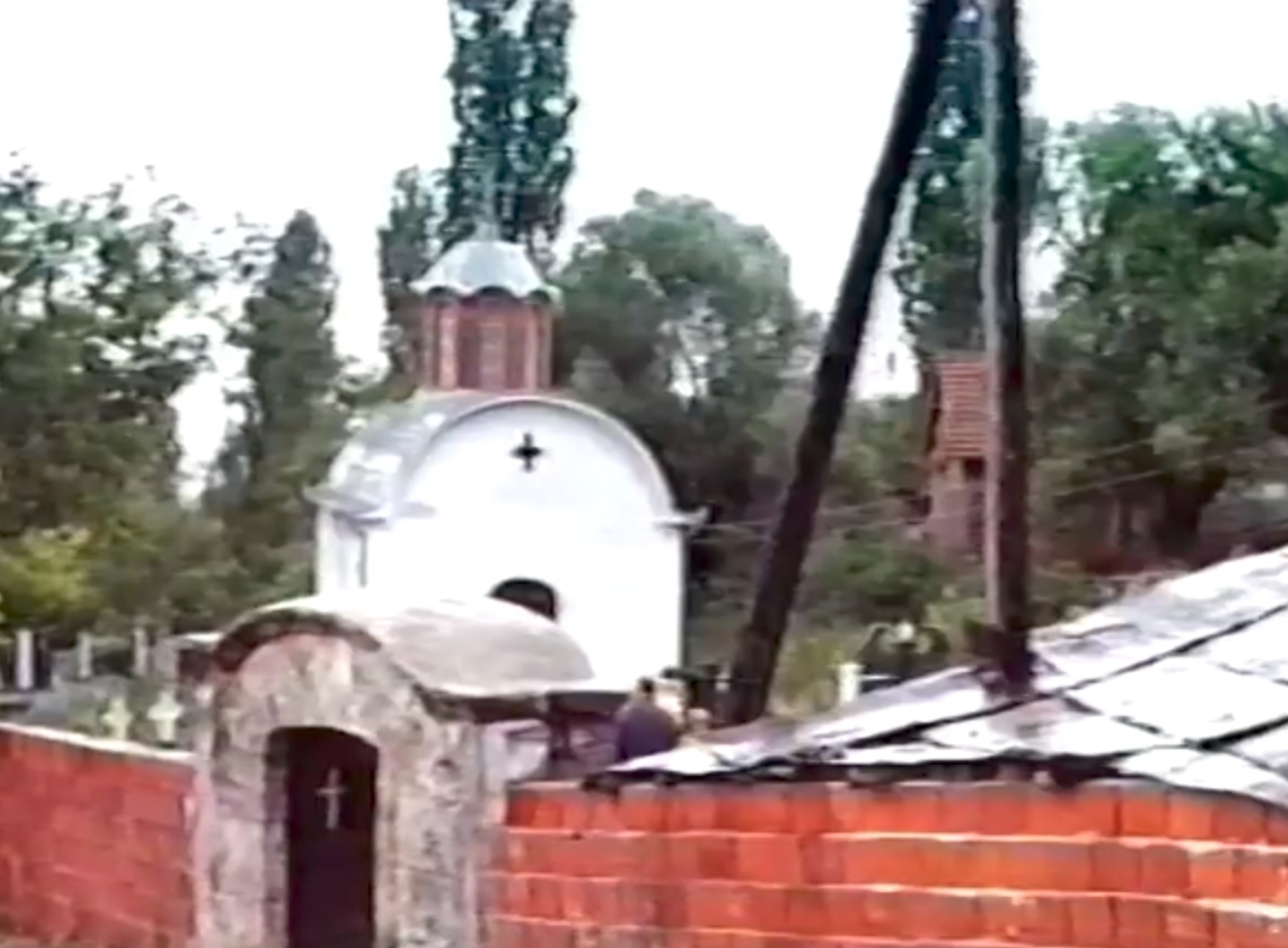
- Church of St. Stephen

Religion
- Affiliation: Serbian Orthodox
- Year consecrated: 14th century

Location
- Location: Donje Nerodimlje, Kosovo
- Interactive map of Church of St. Stephen, Donje Nerodimlje; Kisha e Shën Shtjefënit, Nerodimë e Poshtme; Црква Светог Стефана, Доње Неродимље

Architecture
- Cultural Heritage of Serbia
- Official name: Church of St Stephen
- Type: Cultural monument of Exceptional Importance
- Designated: 3 December 1990

Church of St. Stephen (Serbian: Црква Светог Стефана / Crkva Svetog Stefana; Albanian: Kisha e Shën Shtjefënit) was a Serbian Orthodox church located in Donje Nerodimlje, in the municipality of Ferizaj, Kosovo. It belonged to the Diocese of Raška and Prizren of the Serbian Orthodox Church and it was destroyed during the Kosovo War in 1999.

== Location ==
The church dedicated to St. Stephen, dating from the 14th century, was located in the valley of the river Nerodimka, at the cemetery in Nerodimë e Poshtme, five kilometers west of Ferizaj. The church was rebuilt in 1996. After the arrival of the US KFOR forces in 1999, the church was damaged, burned and destroyed.
