= Church of the Holy Apostles, Petrovac =

Serbian Orthodox Church in Kamenica, Kosovo

Church of Holy Apostles Црква Светих Апостола у Петровцу Kisha e Shën Apostujve në Petrovc

Religion
- Affiliation: Serbian Orthodox

Location
- Location: Petrovac, Kosovo

Church of the Holy Apostles was a Serbian Orthodox Church located in the village of Petrovac, Kamenica, Kosovo. It belonged to the Diocese of Raška and Prizren of the Serbian Orthodox Church.

== The destruction of the church in 1999 ==
Shortly after the arrival of the US KFOR troops, the church was vandalized and destroyed by Albanian extremists.
