= Church of St. Nicholas, Donje Nerodimlje =

Church building in Nerodime e Poshtme, Kosovo

Church of St. Nicholas, Donje Nerodimlje Црква Светог Николе, Доње Неродимље Kisha e Shën Nikollë Nerodimës
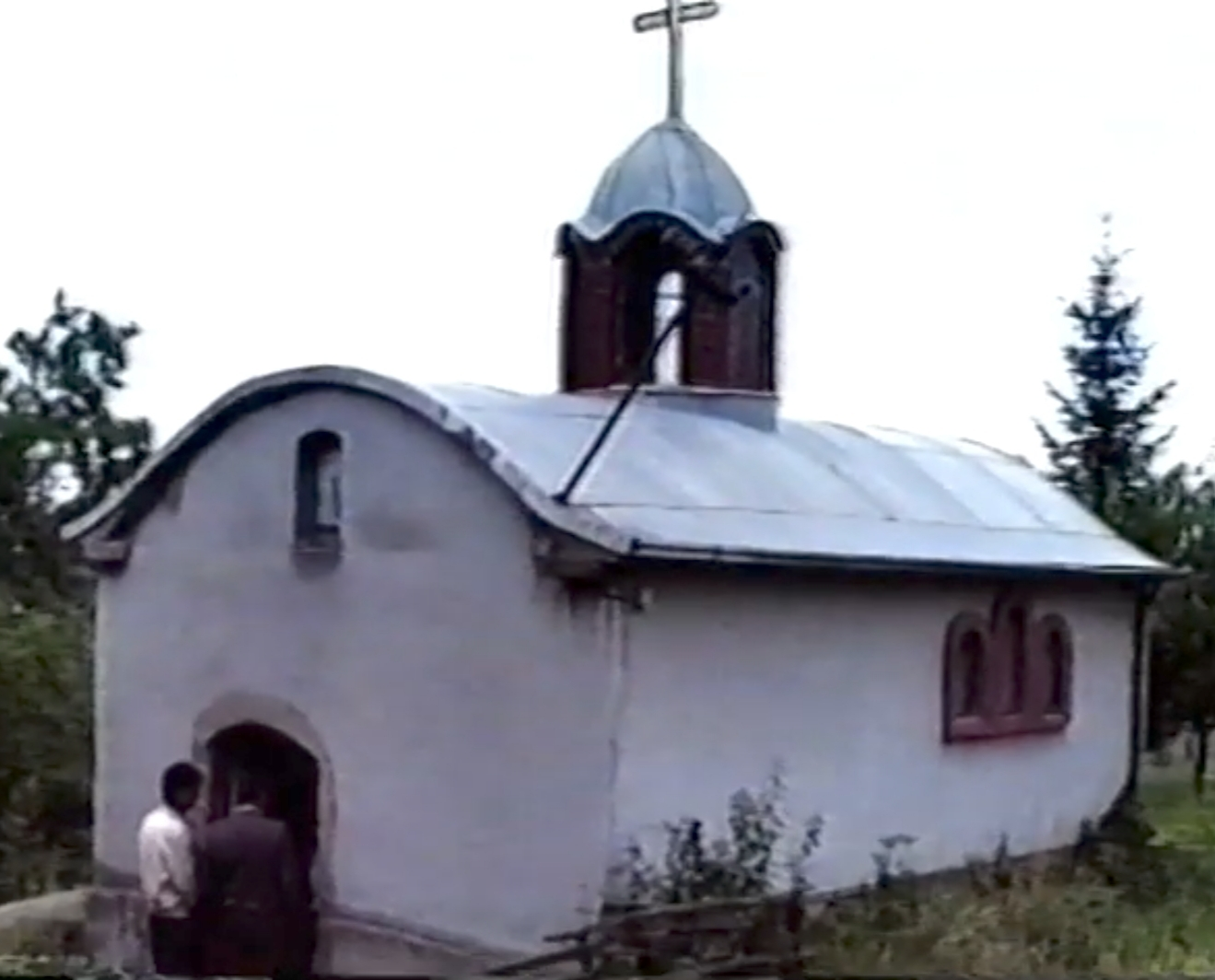
- Church of St. Nicholas

Religion
- Affiliation: Serbian Orthodox
- Year consecrated: 1983

Location
- Location: Donje Nerodimlje, Kosovo
- Interactive map of Church of St. Nicholas, Donje Nerodimlje; Црква Светог Николе, Доње Неродимље; Kisha e Shën Nikollë Nerodimës

Church of St. Nicholas was a Serbian Orthodox church located in Donje Nerodimlje, in the municipality of Ferizaj, Kosovo. It belonged to the Diocese of Raška and Prizren of the Serbian Orthodox Church and it was destroyed by Kosovo Albanians in 1999.

== Architecture ==
The church in Donje Nerodimlje was dedicated to Saint Nicholas, and was rebuilt in 1983 on the foundations of the former Orthodox temple. It was built as a single nave building with an altar apse. A century-old oak tree stood there and the believers used to gather there even while the church was in ruins.

== The destruction of the church in 1999 ==
After the arrival of the US KFOR forces in 1999, the church was damaged, burned and destroyed by Kosovo Albanians. At the same time, a giant black pine tree, which was planted at the time of Emperor Dušan, was cut down and burned. The cemetery was desecrated and the gravestones were demolished.
