= Church of St. Paraskeva, Drsnik =

Church in Dresnik, Kosovo

Coordinates: 42°36′21.75″N 20°36′2″E

Church of St. Petka in Drsnik Гробљанска црква Свете Петке у Дрснику

Religion
- Affiliation: Serbian Orthodox
- Year consecrated: 1560/1570

Location
- Location: Drsnik, Kosovo
- Interactive map of Church of St. Petka in Drsnik; Гробљанска црква Свете Петке у Дрснику

Architecture
- Cultural Heritage of Serbia
- Official name: Serbian Orthodox Church of St. Parascheva of the Balkans
- Type: Monument of Culture of Exceptional Importance
- Designated: 16 April 1958
- Reference no.: SK 1384

The Cemetery Church of St. Petka (Albanian: Kishës varrezore e Shen Premtes, Serbian Cyrillic: Гробљанска црква Свете Петке) is a Serbian Orthodox church in Dresnik, in the municipality of Klina, Kosovo. It was built in the period from 1560 to 1570 and has been designated a cultural monument of exceptional importance. It was burned and damaged by the Albanians after the Kosovo War ended in 1999.

== Architecture ==
The graveyard church in Dresnik is a small church located in the centre of the village and dedicated to the Saint Petka (Saint Parascheva). The church is a single-nave building with a plinth of rough stone and a complex roof covered with stone slabs. Two narrow windows, one on the south wall, and the other on the apse, illuminate the interior. The frescoes have been preserved only on the lower surfaces and show a clear drawing, coloristic variety and a high technological level of work. The church has no historical data, but based on the quality of frescoes it dates from the 1570s.

== The destruction of the church in 1999 ==
In June 1999, after the arrival of the Italian KFOR troops, the church was burned and badly damaged by the Kosovo Albanians.

== See also ==
- Destroyed Serbian heritage in Kosovo
