= Church of the Holy Trinity, Petrič =

Serbian Orthodox Church in Kosovo

Church of the Holy Trinity
- Црква Свете Тројице
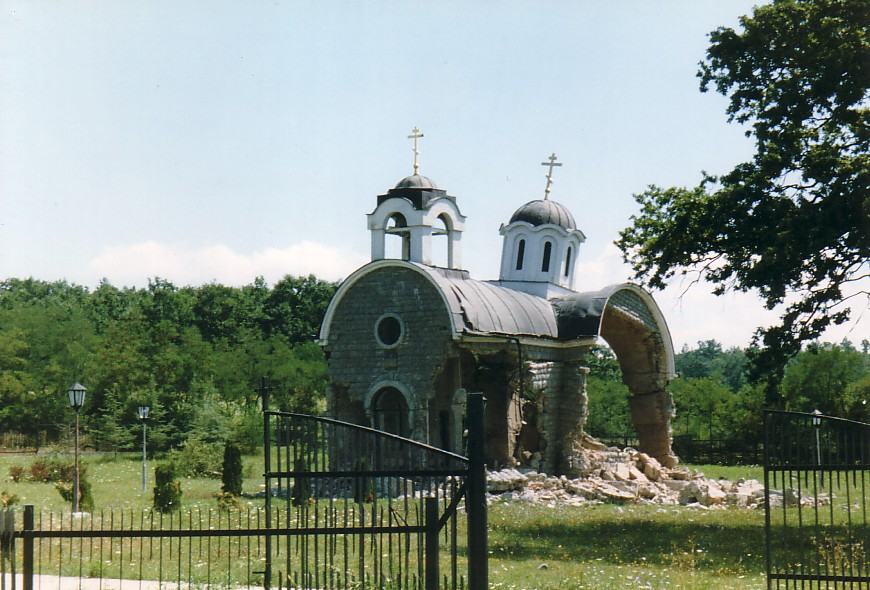
- The church after its destruction in 1999

Religion
- Affiliation: Serbian Orthodox
- Year consecrated: 1992

Location
- Location: Petrič, Kosovo

The Church of the Holy Trinity (Serbian: Црква Свете Тројице, romanized: Crkva Svete Trojice; Albanian: Kisha e Shën Trinisë) was a Serbian Orthodox church located in the village of Petrič, municipality of Peja, in Kosovo. It was built in 1992 as a donation of the Karić family. The destruction of the church happened shortly after the arrival of the Italian KFOR troops. During the humanitarian tragedy of the Kosovo War, the church was vandalized and completely destroyed in June 1999 by Albanians.
