= Mushtisht =

Mushtisht Мушутиште Mušutište
- Village
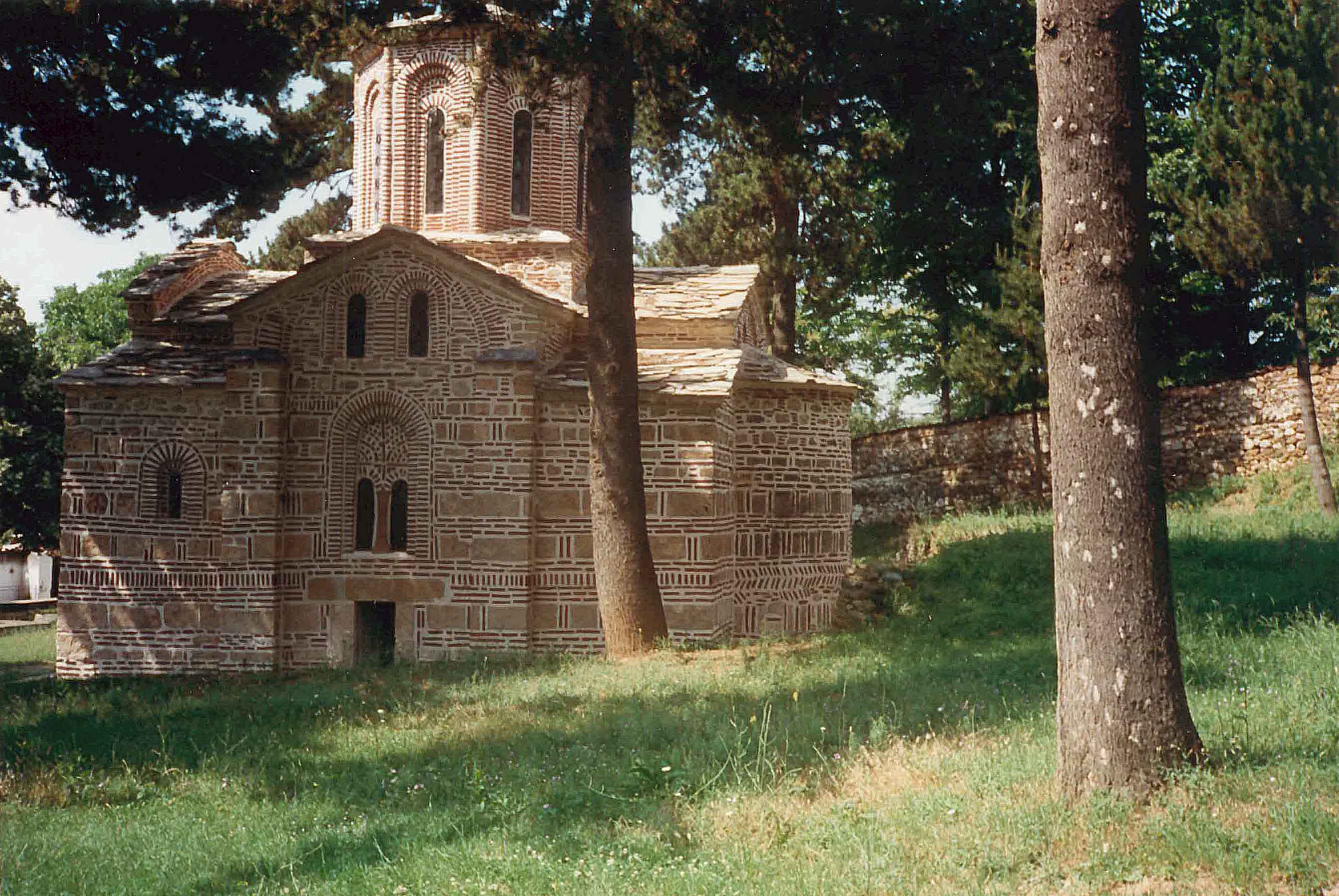
- The Church of Virgin Hodegetria before its destruction

- Location in Kosovo
- Country: Kosovo
- District: Prizren
- Municipality: Suhareka

Population (2024)
  - Total: 2,512
- Time zone: UTC+1 (CET)
  - Summer (DST): UTC+2 (CEST)

Mushtisht (Serbian Cyrillic: Мушутиште) is a village in the Suhareka municipality in Kosovo. It is located to the west of the Nerodimka mountain. It once had 10 medieval Serbian Orthodox churches, including the notable Church of Virgin Hodegetria, which was destroyed in 1999.

The village used to have a mixed Albanian-Serbian population. According to the 1991 census, it had 5,016 inhabitants.

Most of the village's Serb population left immediately after the withdrawal of the Yugoslav Army and Serbian police from Kosovo in June 1999. Only 25, mostly elderly, stayed behind. Twelve of the remaining villagers were abducted on 15 June 1999, six of whom were later confirmed killed and six of whom are still listed as missing. All the remaining Serb houses were subsequently set on fire and most of their properties usurped. Since the war, the return of the village's former Serb inhabitants has been actively opposed by Kosovo Albanian groups.

== History ==
The village was first mentioned in a Serbian charter dating to 1315. In a charter of Emperor Stephen Uroš IV Dušan, dating to 1348, Mušutište, along with the churches of Virgin Hodegetria and St. Symeon (Sv. Simeona), were granted (metochion) to the Saint Archangels Monastery in Prizren. The churches were destroyed after the 1999 conflict.

Demographic history
Ethnic group	1948	1953	1961	1971	1981	1991
Albanians					2,980	
Serbs					1,173	
Others					2	
Total	2,346	2,541	2,816	3,307	4,155	5,016

== Notable people ==
- Lindon Emërllahu, professional footballer who plays for the Kosovo national team
- Esat Mala, Albanian footballer
