= Church of the Holy Saviour, Prizren =

Serbian Orthodox church in Prizren, Kosovo

Coordinates: 42°12′29″N 20°44′36″E

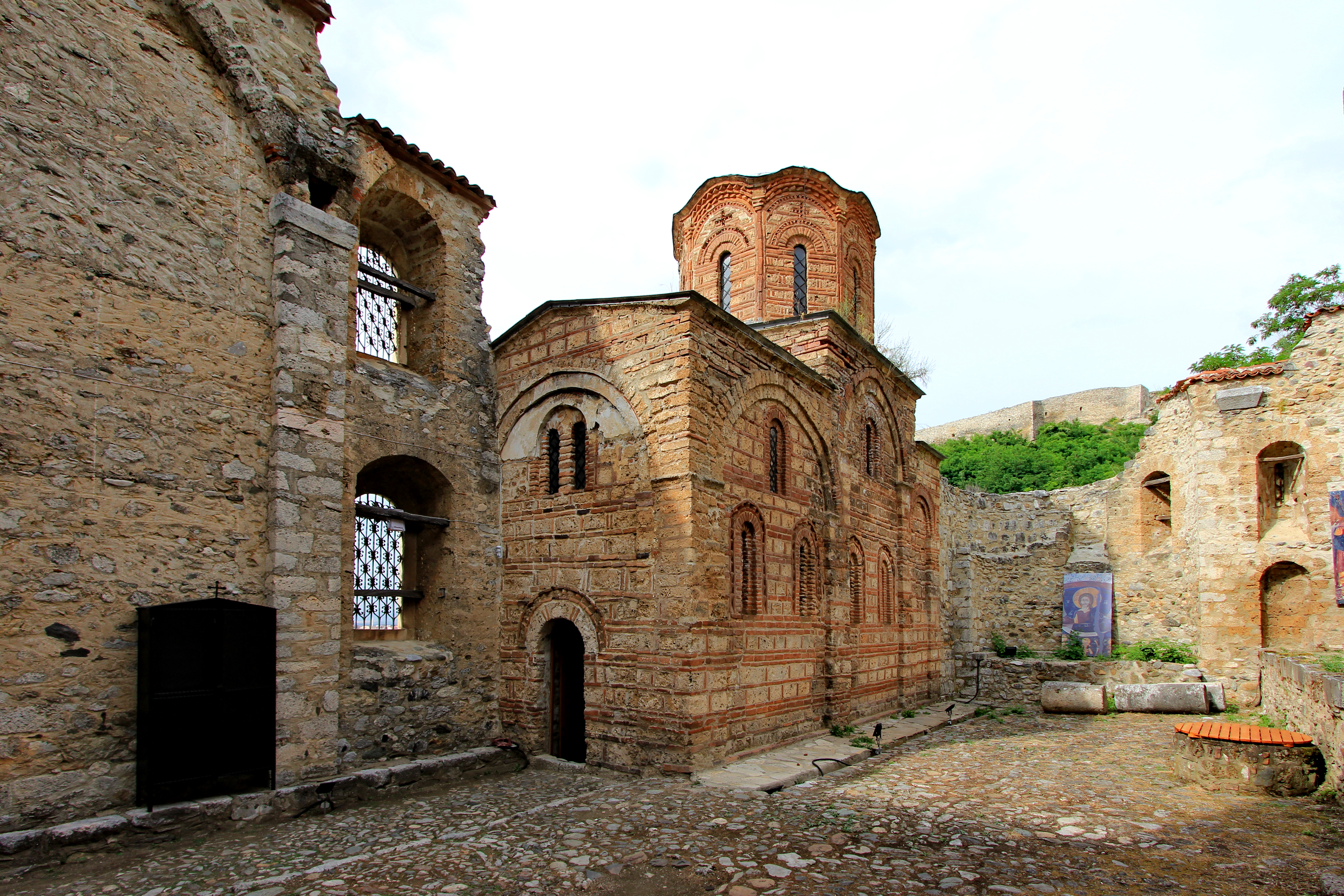
View of the building in 2015

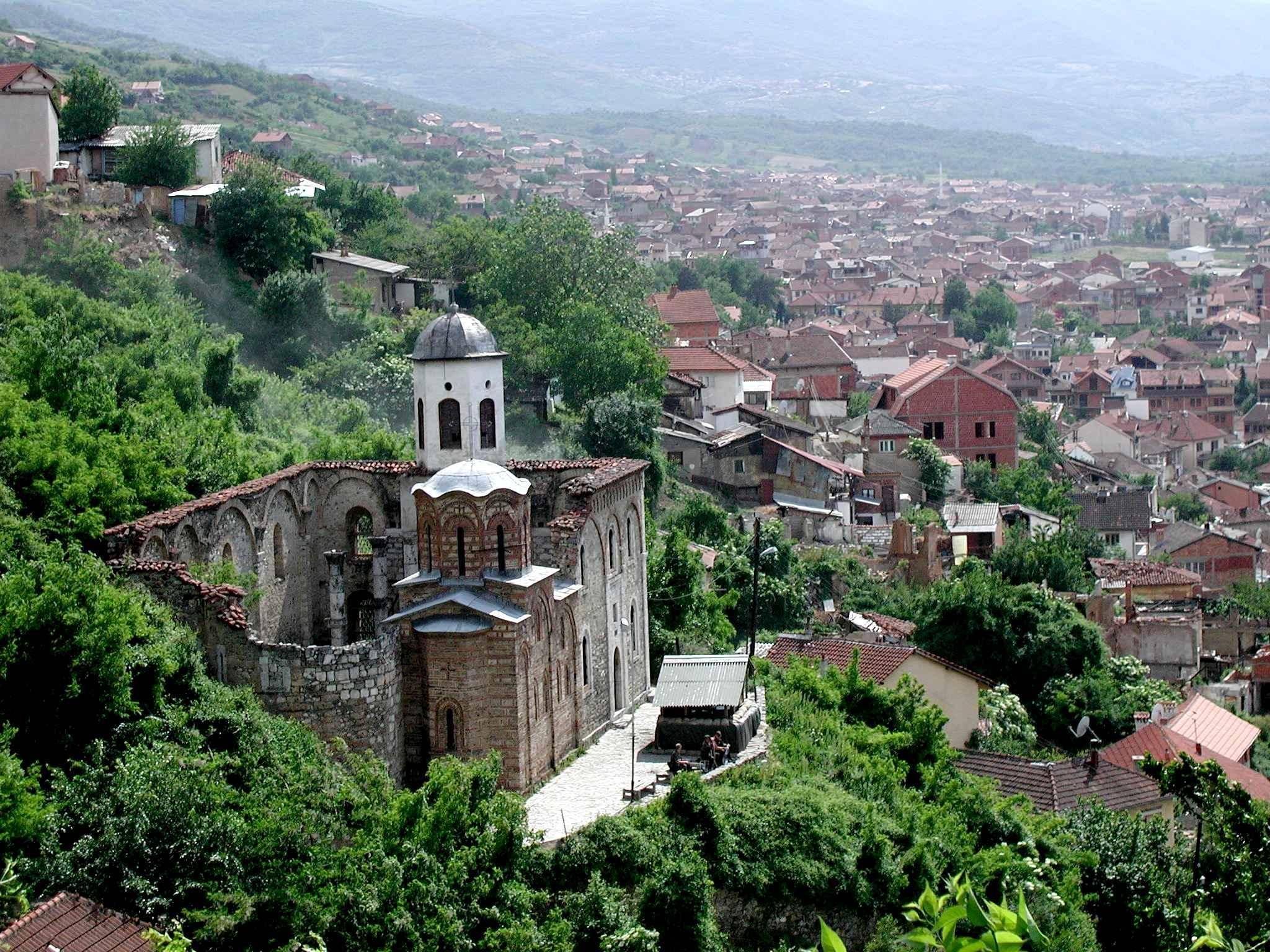
Ruins of the church after the 2004 unrest in Kosovo.

The Church of the Holy Saviour (Serbian: Црква Светог Спаса, romanized: Crkva Svetog Spasa; Albanian: Kisha e Shën Spasit) is a Serbian Orthodox church located in Prizren, Kosovo, built around 1330.

The church was declared a Monument of Culture of Exceptional Importance in 1990, and it is protected by the Republic of Serbia. It was heavily damaged during the 2004 unrest in Kosovo.

== See also ==
- Monument of Culture of Exceptional Importance
- Tourism in Kosovo
- Prizren
