= Church of the Theotokos Hodegetria, Mushtisht =

Serbian Orthodox church near Suva Reka, Kosovo

Coordinates: 42°17′26″N 20°53′38″E

Church of the Theotokos Hodegetria Црква Св. Богородице Одигитрије Kisha e Virgjëreshës së Shenjtë në Hodegetri
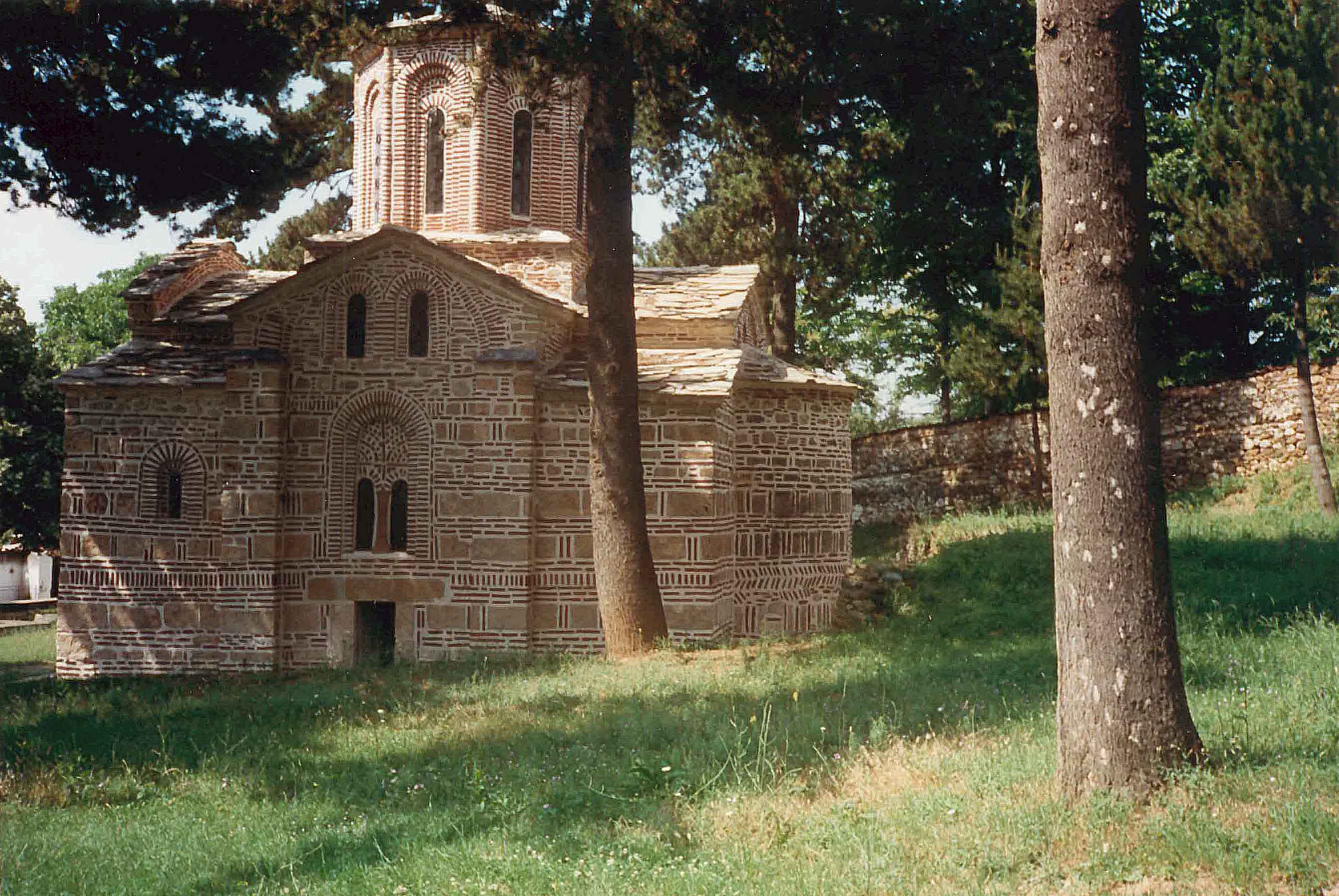
- Church of Virgin Hodegetria before destruction

Religion
- Affiliation: Serbian Orthodox

Location
- Location: Mushtisht, Kosovo
- Interactive map of Church of the Theotokos Hodegetria; Црква Св. Богородице Одигитрије; Kisha e Virgjëreshës së Shenjtë në Hodegetri

Architecture
- Founder: Jovan Dragoslav
- Completed: 1315
- Demolished: 1999
- Cultural Heritage of Serbia
- Official name: Crkva Sv. Bogorodice Odigitrije
- Type: Cultural monument of Exceptional Importance
- Designated: 27 November 1948
- Reference no.: SK 1414

The Church of the Theotokos Hodegetria (Serbian: Црква Богородице Одигитриjе, romanized: Crkva Bogorodice Odigitrije; Albanian: Kisha e Virgjëreshës së Shenjtë në Hodegetri) was a 14th-century Serbian Orthodox church in Mušutište, near Suva Reka, Kosovo,. The church was destroyed by Kosovar Albanian forces during the destruction of the Serbian part of Mushtisht, after the end of the Kosovo war in 1999.

== History ==
The church was built as an endowment by Serbian nobleman Jovan Dragoslav in 1315. The inscription at the entrance of the church was considered one of the oldest and most accomplished Serbian epigraphic texts of its kind. It was an inscribed-cross church with a semi-dome and a semi-round apse. The wall was built of alternating rows of bricks and stone cubes. The frescoes of the Mušutište School, related to the style of the Palaiologos era, were painted between 1316 and 1320 and were famed for their plasticity and the saints' typology were known as the best examples of Serbian art.

In the altar area there was a unique portrait of St Clement of Ohrid. In the north-western corner of the naos there were figures of holy women, the warrior saints Theodore Tyro and Theodore Stratelates, angels, and St Panteleimon. Two throne icons of Christ and The Holy Virgin dated back to the year 1603.

== Protection ==
The church was designed a monument of culture on 27 November 1948. It was inscribed in the list of the Monuments of Culture of Exceptional Importance in 1990.

== See also ==
- Monument of Culture of Exceptional Importance
- Kosovo Serbs

== Sources ==
- Историјски часопис 44 (1997): Historical Review 44. Istorijski institut. 1 January 1998. pp. 370–. GGKEY:9A9KJ15QHZU.
- "Црква Св. Богородице Одигитрије". "Задужбина великог казнаца Јована Драгослава и његове породице налазила се изнад села Мушутишта, десетак километара југоисточно од Суве Реке. Саграђена је 1315. о чему је сведочио дугачак клесани натпис на надвратнику западног портала. Ктитор је један од првих српских велможа који је имао могућности да подигне тако велику цркву. Зидана је наизменичним редовима камена и опеке, док je полукружна олтарска апсида носила сложенију декорацију у комбинацији опеке и малтера. Основа је у облику уписаног крста са куполом која је почивала на четири слободна ступца. Сликарство је било сасвим фрагментарно сачувано: само четири архијереја насликаних у олтарском простору (укључујући једну од најстаријих представа св. Климента Охридског) и неколико појединачних фигура у северозападном углу наоса (свете жене, ратници Теодори Тирон и Стратилат, анђели и св. Пантелејмон) говорили су о великом умећу и образовању сликара. Фреске у Мушутишту, мада немају непосредних паралела, сврставане су међу најлепша остварења епохе краља Милутина. Иако њихов настанак није поменут у ктиторском натпису, претпоставља се да су изведене непосредно по завршетку градње, а најкасније до 1320. У цркви су чуване две престоне иконе из 1603. Храм је доживео обнову у другој половини XIX века. Конзерваторски радови нису извођени, а црква је срушена у лето 1999."
- Задужбине Косова, споменице и значења српског народа, Призрен-Београд. Ljubljana: Дело. 1987. "„Поче се и сазида се божански и свечасни храм Пречисте Владичице Наше Богородице Одигитрије из темеља, у дане превисокога краља Уроша, трудом и старањем великог казнаца Драгослава, са Јеленом супругом својом и Станишом, сином својим, и Аном, кћерју својом, године 7823, индикта 5.""
