= Sllovi =

Sllovi: Sllovi (Albanian); Словиње/Slovinje (Serbian)
- Village
- Location within Kosovo
- Coordinates: 42.521711°N 21.221219°E
- Location: Kosovo
- District: Prishtinë
- Municipality: Lipjan

Population (2024)
  - Total: 2,724
- Time zone: UTC+1 (CET)
  - Summer (DST): UTC+2 (CEST)

Sllovi (Albanian: Sllovi, Serbian Cyrillic: Словиње/Slovinje) is a village in Lipjan municipality.
