= Gjurakoc =

- Village
- Interactive map of Gjurakoc
- Coordinates: 42°43′32″N 20°28′19″E
- Country: Kosovo
- District: Peja
- Municipality: Istog

Population (2024)
  - Total: 1,755
- Time zone: UTC+1 (Central European Time)
  - Summer (DST): UTC+2 (CEST)

Gjurakoc is a village in the municipality of Istog, Kosovo. It is located south of Istog.
