= Samadrexhë, Vushtrri =

Village in Vushtrri, Kosovo

Samadrexhë is a village in the Vushtrri municipality in Kosovo. It is inhabited exclusively by ethnic Albanians.

== Notable people ==
- Fatjon Bunjaku, Kosovan footballer
- Baton Zabërgja, Kosovan Footballer
- Elbasan Rashani, Kosovan Footballer
- Enis Zabërgja, Kosovan Footballer
