= Nerodimë e Poshtme =

Village in Kosovo

Nerodimë e Poshtme Donje Nerodimlje
- Village
- Location within Kosovo
- Coordinates: 42.364293°N 21.09826°E
- Location: Kosovo
- District: District of Ferizaj
- Municipality: Ferizaj

Population (2024)
  - Total: 1,512

Nerodimë e Poshtme or Donje Nerodimlje (Serbian Cyrillic: Доње Неродимље) is an archaeological site and village situated west of the city of Ferizaj, Kosovo. Several archaeological trenches were investigated at this location in 1988 (which is close to the Orthodox cemetery).

== Churches ==
- Church of St. Nicholas, Donje Nerodimlje
- Church of St. Stephen, Donje Nerodimlje

== See also ==
- Roman Dardania
- Roman cities in Illyria
- Roman Period Sites in Kosovo
