= List of bazaars in Kosovo =

A bazaar or souk is a permanently enclosed marketplace or street where goods and services are exchanged or sold. The term bazaar originates from the Persian word bāzār. The term bazaar is sometimes also used to refer to the "network of merchants, bankers and craftsmen" who work in that area. Although the word "bazaar" is of Persian origin, its use has spread and now has been accepted into the vernacular in countries around the world.

The term souk (Arabic: سوق suq, Hebrew: שוק shuq, Syriac: ܫܘܩܐ shuqa, Armenian: շուկա shuka, Spanish: zoco, also spelled souq, shuk, shooq, soq, esouk, succ, suk, sooq, suq, soek) is used in Western Asian, North African and some Horn African cities (Amharic: ሱቅ sooq).

== List of Bazaars in Kosovo ==
Name	Location	Picture	Notes
Bazaar of Peja	Peja		Bazaar of Peja or Peja market is a market place in the center of the city of Peja, in Kosovo^{[a]}. It was established during Ottoman rule and is located near the Pećka Bistrica river, between parallel residence zones. The market historically housed blacksmiths and carpenters but also facilitated the agricultural market. The market place was completely destroyed at least twice, once during the Italian occupation in 1943, and once during the Kosovo War (1998–99). The market was fully rebuilt after the Kosovo War, according to the historical Ottoman architecture, and serves as the main market in the city of Peja, and is one of the many monuments which are under protection by the Republic of Kosovo. The main street of the market is known in Albanian as Çarshia e Gjatë (English: Long Bazaar).
Bazaar of Pristina	Pristina		The Bazaar of Pristina, Kosovo^{[a]}, was the core merchandising center of the Old Pristina since the 15th century, when it was built. It played a significant role in the physical, economic, and social development of Pristina. The Old Bazaar was destroyed during the 1950s and 1960s, following the modernization slogan of "Destroy the old, build the new". In its place, buildings of Kosovo Assembly, Municipality of Pristina, PTT, and Brotherhood and Unity socialist square were built. Nowadays, instead of PTT building resides the Government of Kosovo building. Only few historical buildings, such as the Bazaar Mosque and ruins of the Bazaar Hammam have remained from the Bazaar complex.
Old Bazaar	Gjakova		The Old Bazaar in Gjakova is the oldest bazaar in Kosovo^{[a]} (also known as Çarshia e Madhe (Grand Bazaar) or Dakovica. Mëhalla e Hadumit, the historical neighborhood where it is located also houses the city's oldest mosque, the Hadum Mosque (Xhamia e Hadumit), which dates from the 15th century.

== See also ==
- Khan el-Khalili
- List of bazaars and souks
