= Shadërvan, Prishtina =

Shadërvan
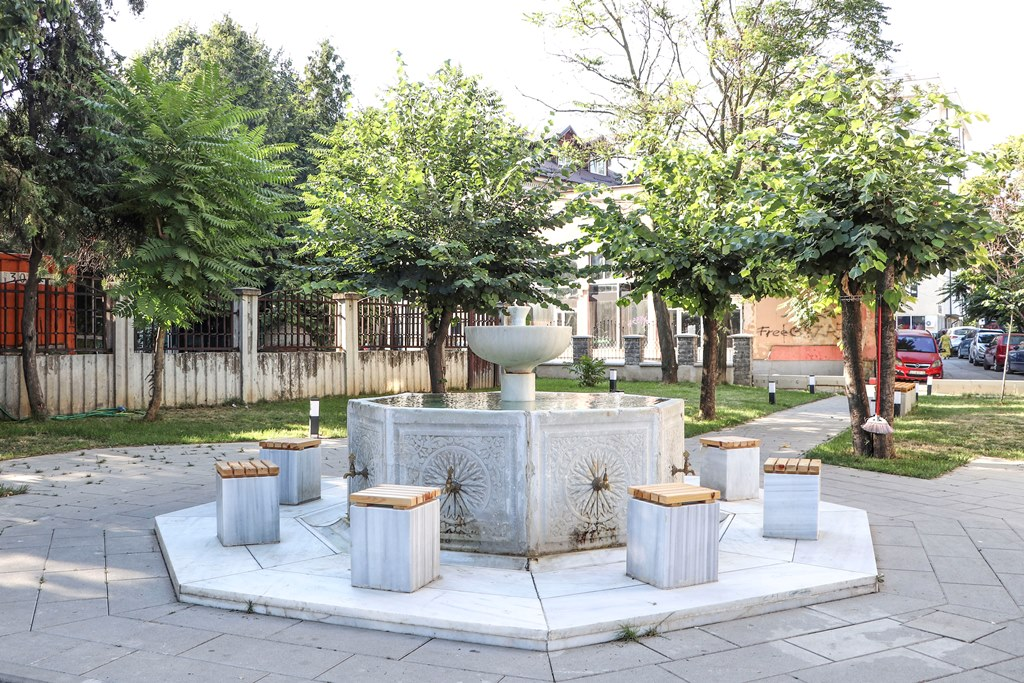

General information
- Type: Marble Fountain
- Architectural style: Ottoman
- Location: Pristina, Kosovo

Shadërvan is a marble fountain located between the Çarshi Mosque and the Museum of Kosovo in Pristina, Kosovo, and is a typical component of Ottoman architecture. The fountain is the only one remaining in the city from over fifty that once existed. In addition to providing a source of drinkable water, Shadërvan has been traditionally used for ritual ablution.
