= Historical monuments in Pristina =

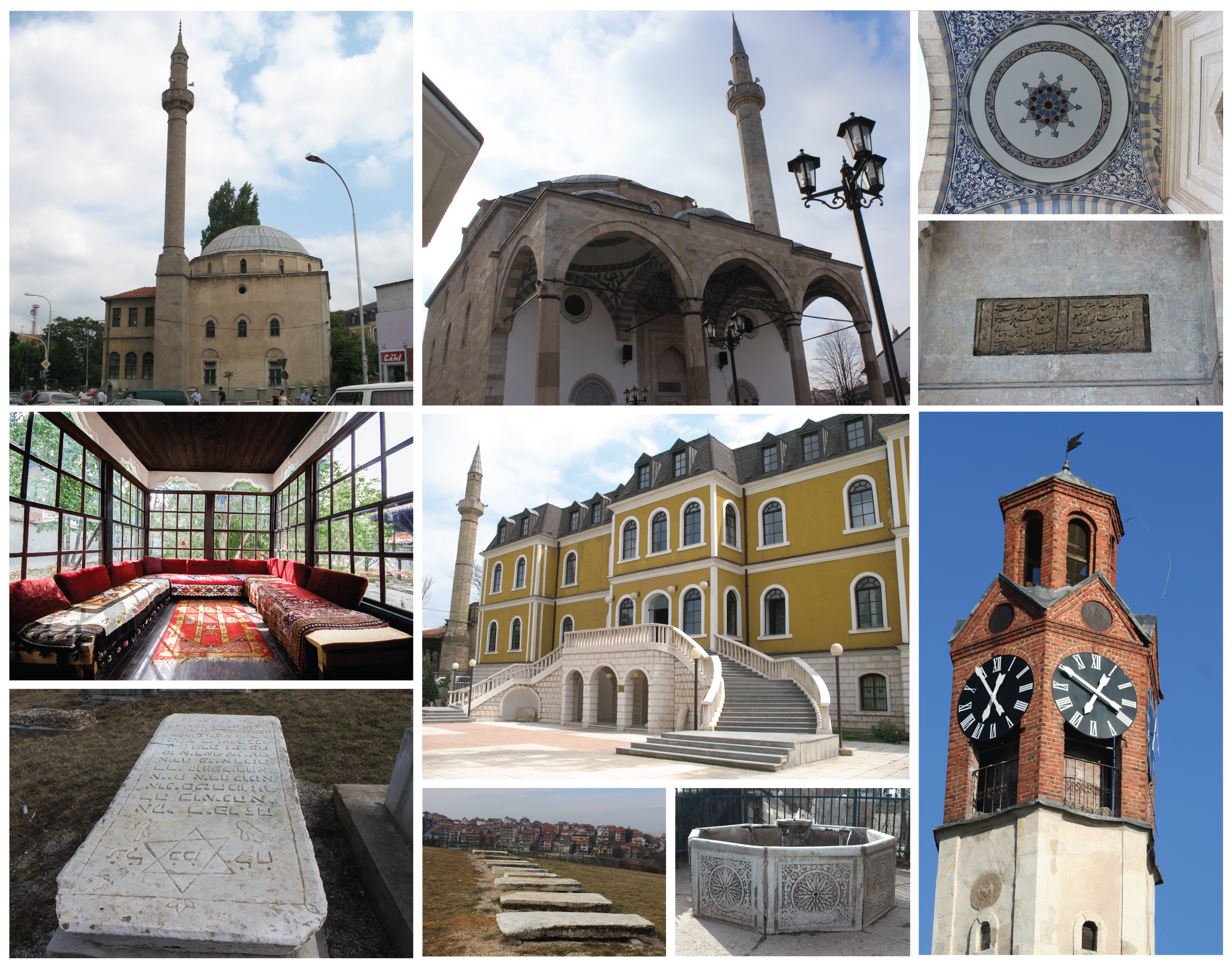
From top left clockwise: Çarshi Mosque, Imperial Mosque, Ornamental design in the domes of Imperial Mosque, Scripture on entrance of Imperial Mosque, the clock tower, Shadërvan fountain, Jewish cemetery, Scripture on a tomb on the Jewish cemetery, Ethnological Museum "Emin Gjiku", Museum of Kosovo

Historical monuments in Pristina are made up of 21 monuments out of a total of 426 protected monuments all over Kosovo. A large number of these monuments date back to the Byzantine and Ottoman periods. Since 1945, the Yugoslav authorities followed the idea of constructing a modern Pristina by relying in the urban development motto “destroy the old, build the new” and this resulted with major changes in the structure of the buildings, their function and their surrounding environment. However, numerous types of monuments have been preserved, including four mosques, a restored orthodox church, an Ottoman bath, a public fountain, a clock tower, several traditional houses as well as European-influenced architecture buildings such as the Museum of Kosovo. These symbolize the historical and cultural character of Pristina as it was developed throughout centuries in the spirit of conquering empires (Roman, Byzantine, Ottoman and Austro-Hungarian).

== Overview of the history of Pristina ==
The city of Pristina has always been an area in flux with people coming and going. It has been inhabited for nearly 10.000 years. The early Neolithic findings dating from the 8th century BC were discovered in the areas surrounding Pristina such as: Matiqan, Gracanica and Ulpiana.

In the Roman period, Pristina was part of the province of Dardania and nearby Ulpiana which was considered one of the most important Roman cities in the whole Balkans, became a Roman municipium in the 2nd century AD.

The city was damaged by an earthquake in AD 518 and it was again rebuilt by the Byzantine Emperor Justinian I who renamed it Iustiniana Secunda. By the arrival of Slavs in the 6th century, the city fell again in reconstruction.

During the 14th and the 15th century, Pristina was classified as an important mining and trading center on the Balkan market due to its position near the rich mining town of Novo Brdo. Pristina was famous for its trade fairs and items, such as goatskin and goat hair, as well as gunpowder produced by artisans from Pristina in 1485. The first mosque in Pristina was built in the late 14th century, while under the Serbian rule.

Pristina was considered to be an important town in Medieval Serbia by having been a royal estate of Stefan Milutin, Stefan Uroš III, Stefan Dušan, Stefan Uroš V and Vuk Branković. In the early Ottoman era, Islam was spread increasingly throughout the population. In those years Pristina was part of the Vushtrri sancak and its 2.000 families enjoyed the peace and the stability of this era. During the 17th century, citizens of Pristina led by the Albanian priest Pjeter Bogdani vowed loyalty to the Austrian army and its troops.

A communist decision to make Pristina the capital of Kosovo happened in 1947 during a period of a rapid development and structural despair. A famous slogan spread during this period was “destroy the old, build the new”.

== List of monuments ==
=== Religious ===
==== Imperial Mosque ====
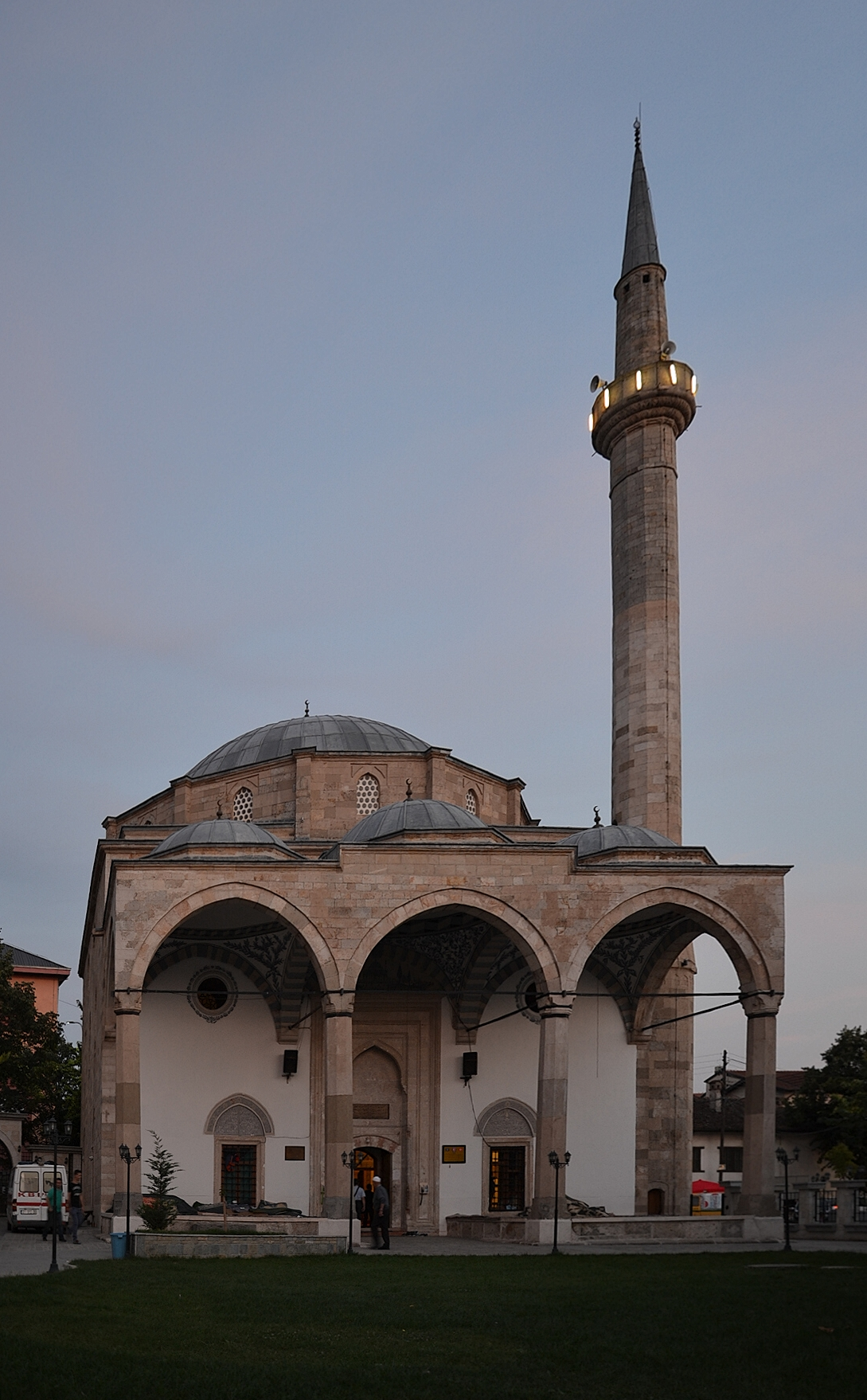
Imperial Mosque in the Ottoman quarter of Pristina, Kosovo

The Imperial Mosque (Albanian: Xhamia e Mbretit), is located in the old quarter of Pristina opposite the clock tower. It was built in 1460–1461 during the reign of the Ottoman Sultan Mehmet II, also known as al-Fatih or the Conqueror and was named in his honor. Its interior features ornamental decorations and detailed floral designs, as well as a 15-meter dome, which was quite impressive for a 15th-century construction. It was recognized region-wide as the largest construction of this nature. In 1689, the mosque was temporarily converted into a Jesuit church dedicated to Francis Xavier by the Austrian occupants during the Austro-Turkish War. The Imperial Mosque was restored during the rule of Sultan Mehmet IV in 1682–1683, whereas the present-day minaret is a reconstruction of the original, which was damaged during the earthquake that struck Pristina in 1955. The mosque presently suffers from damage that has been caused over time; moisture is the biggest threat, harming the walls and stones of the construction.

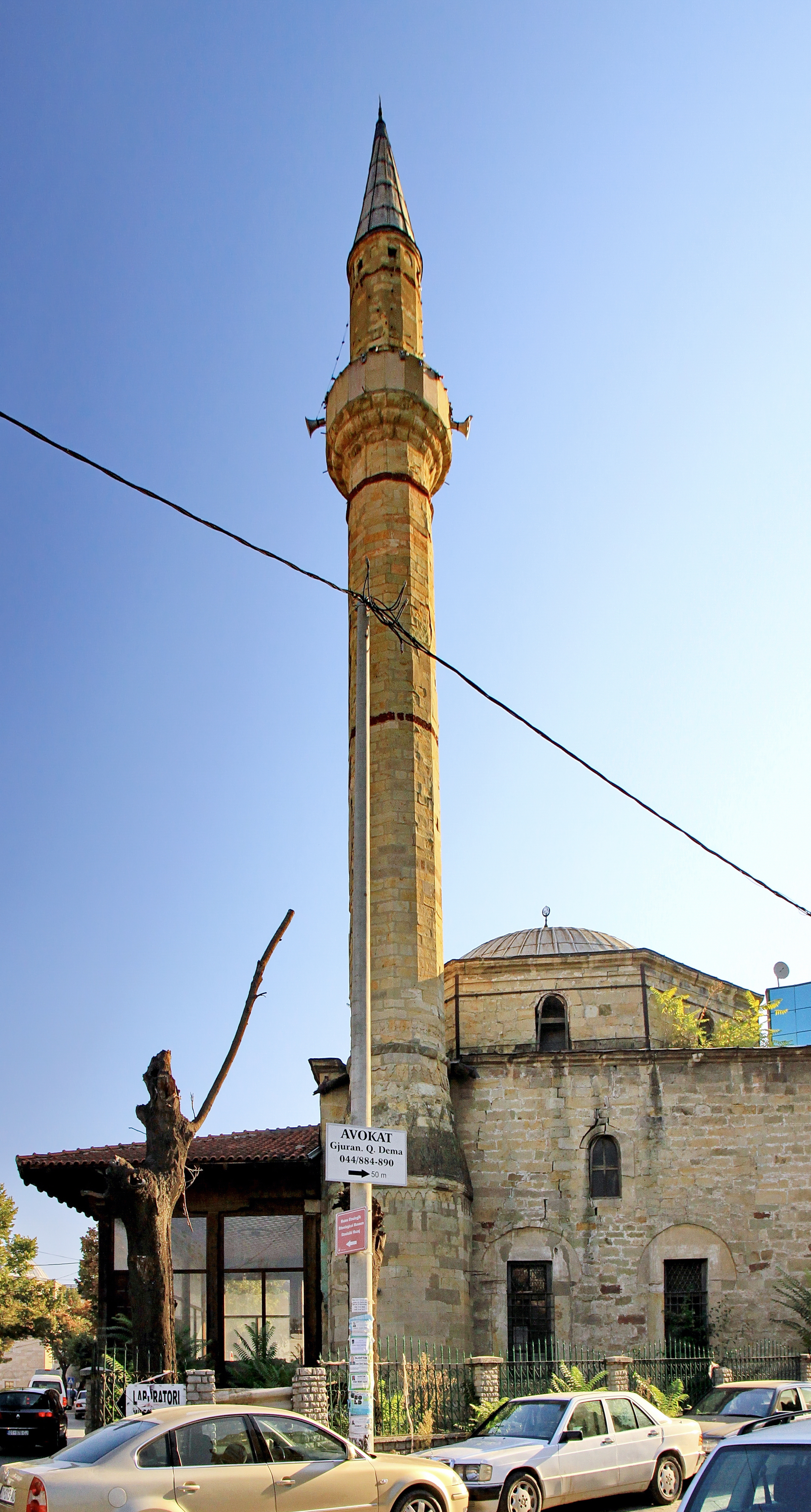
Jashar Pasha Mosque

==== Jashar Pasha Mosque ====
The Jashar Pasha Mosque, located in the historic centre of the city of Pristina, is a remarkable and notable part of Ottoman cultural heritage in this part of the Balkans. It was named after Jashar Mehmet Pasha, a wealthy citizen of Pristina and mayor of Skopje in 1842. Inscriptions found inside the mosque led to the conclusion that it was built in 1834. Jashar Pasha Mosque is a typical architectural monument for old cities with Ottoman heritage. It symbolizes a sacral building of ‘Kosovar style’ with an acknowledgement of oriental influence. Its aim was to speed up the acceptance of Islam among the citizens of Pristina. It is composed of a hall for prayers, hayat and a minaret. The mosque is disguised by a cupola supported by four pendentives. The original portico was torn down to give way to an expansion of the neighboring street. Currently, the building is in danger of being damaged as a result of humidity coming from the cracks in its walls. The particular characteristics of this monument and the attributes of the historical area where it is situated constitute the main components for the development of cultural tourism.

==== Çarshi Mosque ====
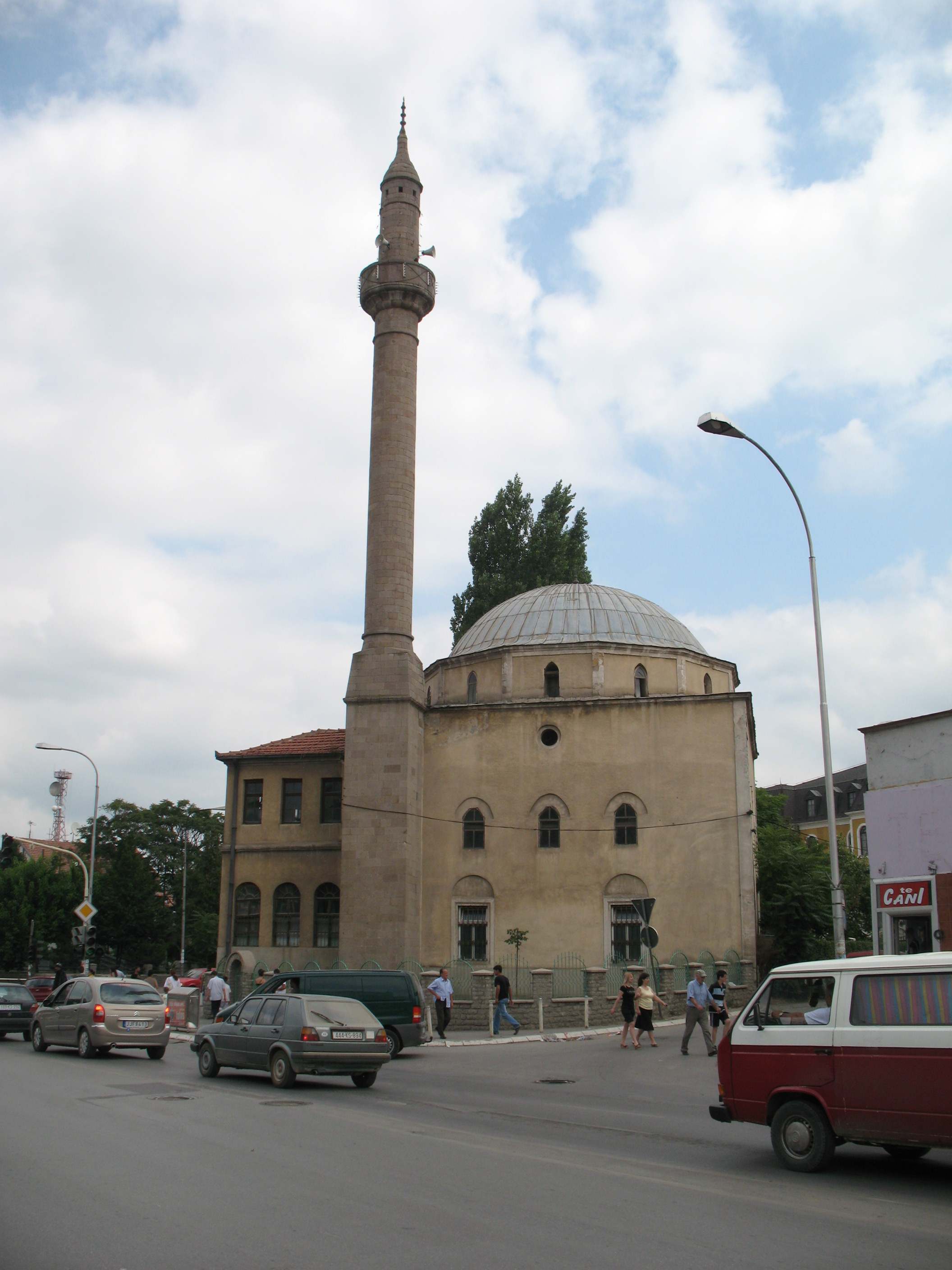
Çarshi Mosque

The Çarshi Mosque, also known as the Bazaar Mosque and the Taş Mosque (literally, the Stone Mosque) (Albanian: Xhamia e Çarshisë), is the oldest building in Pristina and it marks the beginning of the old town. The basement of this mosque was laid out in 1389 during the rule of the Ottoman Sultan Bayezid I and its construction was continued during the reign of Sultan Murad II in the 15th century. The Carshi Mosque was built to celebrate the Ottoman victory of 1389 in the Battle of Kosovo. Over the years, the mosque has undergone through several restorations. However, its stone-topped minaret has survived for over six centuries (hence, it is often referred to as the Taş Mosque, or the Stone Mosque).

==== Pirinaz Mosque ====
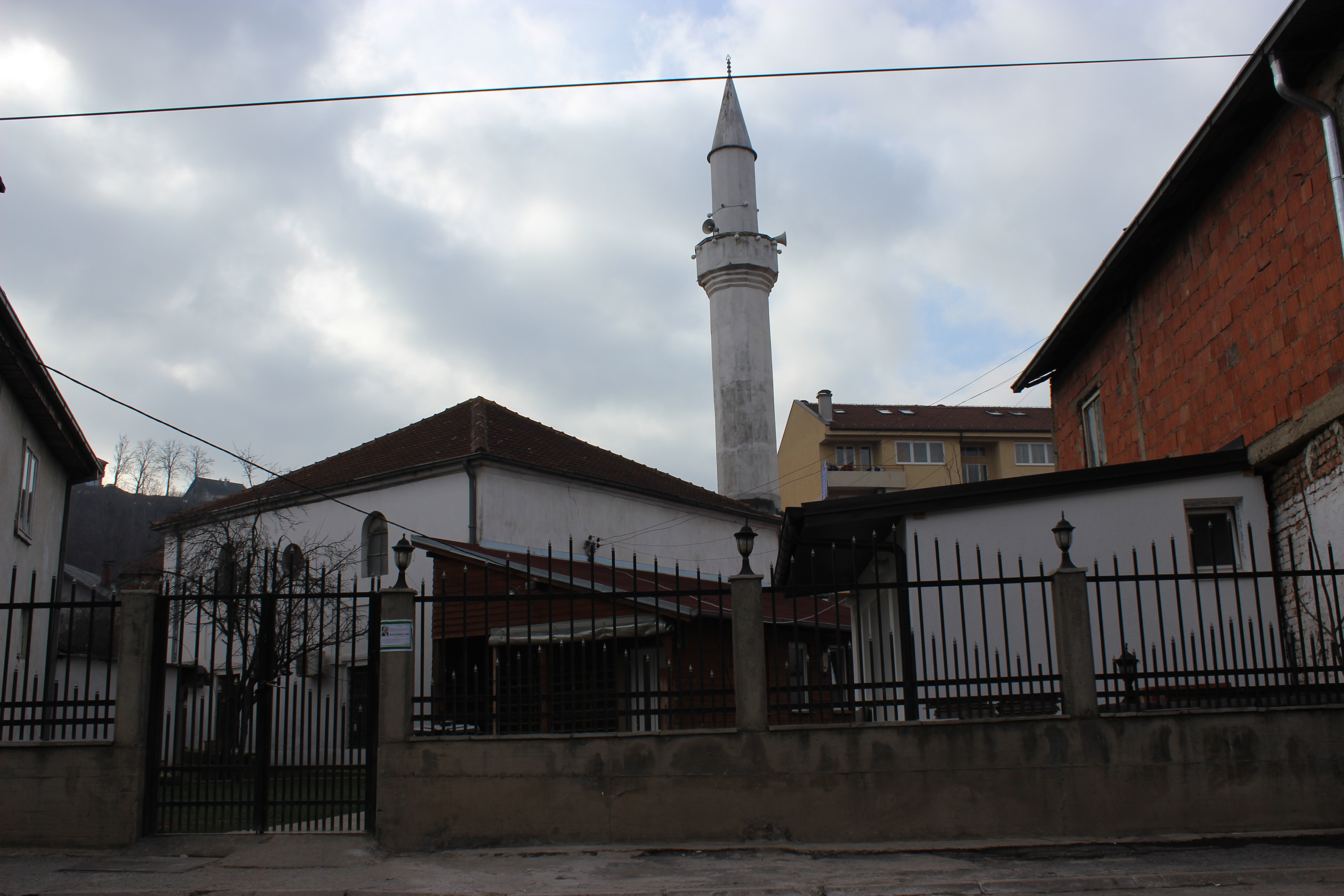
Pirinaz Mosque

Pirinaz Mosque was built in the second half of the 16th century and was founded by Piri Nazir who served as Vezir under two Ottoman Sultans. The Pirinaz Mosque is made of the same stone as Mbretit (Fatih) Mosque but its construction began 100 years later. This mosque represents an important cultural value, which is further increased by the belief that Prince Lazar's remains were buried on the location of today's Pirinaz Mosque with the permission of Sultan Bayezid, son and successor of Murat, who died in the battle of Kosovo in 1389. Later on, Lazar's remains were moved to Ravanici Monastery in Serbia. Furthermore, the local legend has it that “Stone of Lazar” located in the garden of Pirinaz Mosque was used to behead Prince Lazar. However, the real circumstances encompassing Lazar's death, remain unknown.

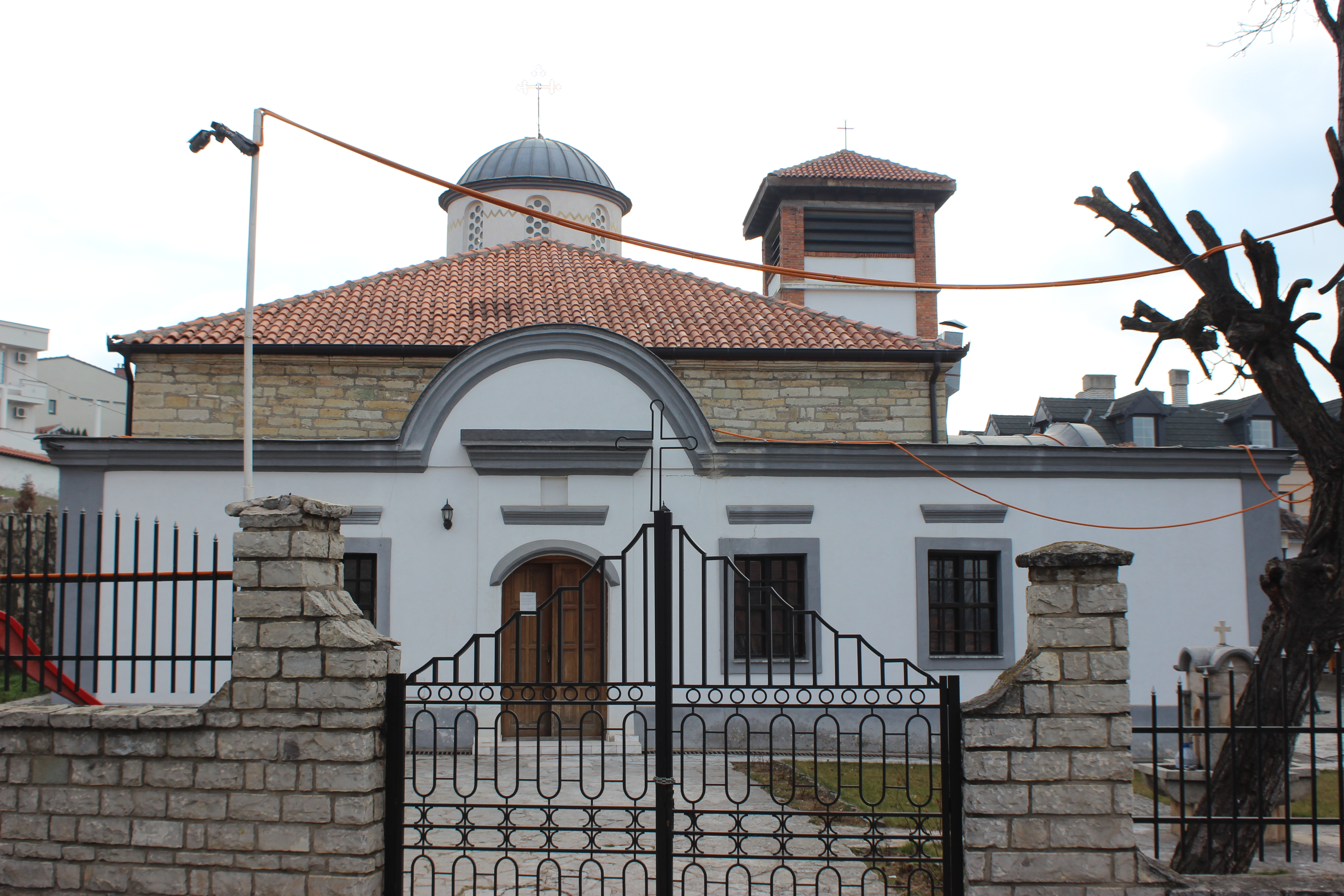
Saint Nicholas Orthodox Church

==== Saint Nicholas Church ====
The Saint Nicholas Church is the only remaining operative Serbian Orthodox Church in Pristina. It is housed in a 19th-century building, which was damaged during the 2004 unrest in Kosovo and was restored thereafter with European Union funding. It used to showcase 18th century wooden icons, created by painters based in Debar, Macedonia, several 18th-century frescos and an iconostasis of 1840 from Belgrade, Serbia, which were all irreversibly damaged during the 2004 unrest. The Saint Nicholas Church once again began to hold liturgies in 2010 in a ceremony attended by a few hundred Serbian Orthodox believers. It now features a revamped exterior, restored roof, new marble tiles and new icons.

=== Baths and Fountains ===
==== Great Hammam ====
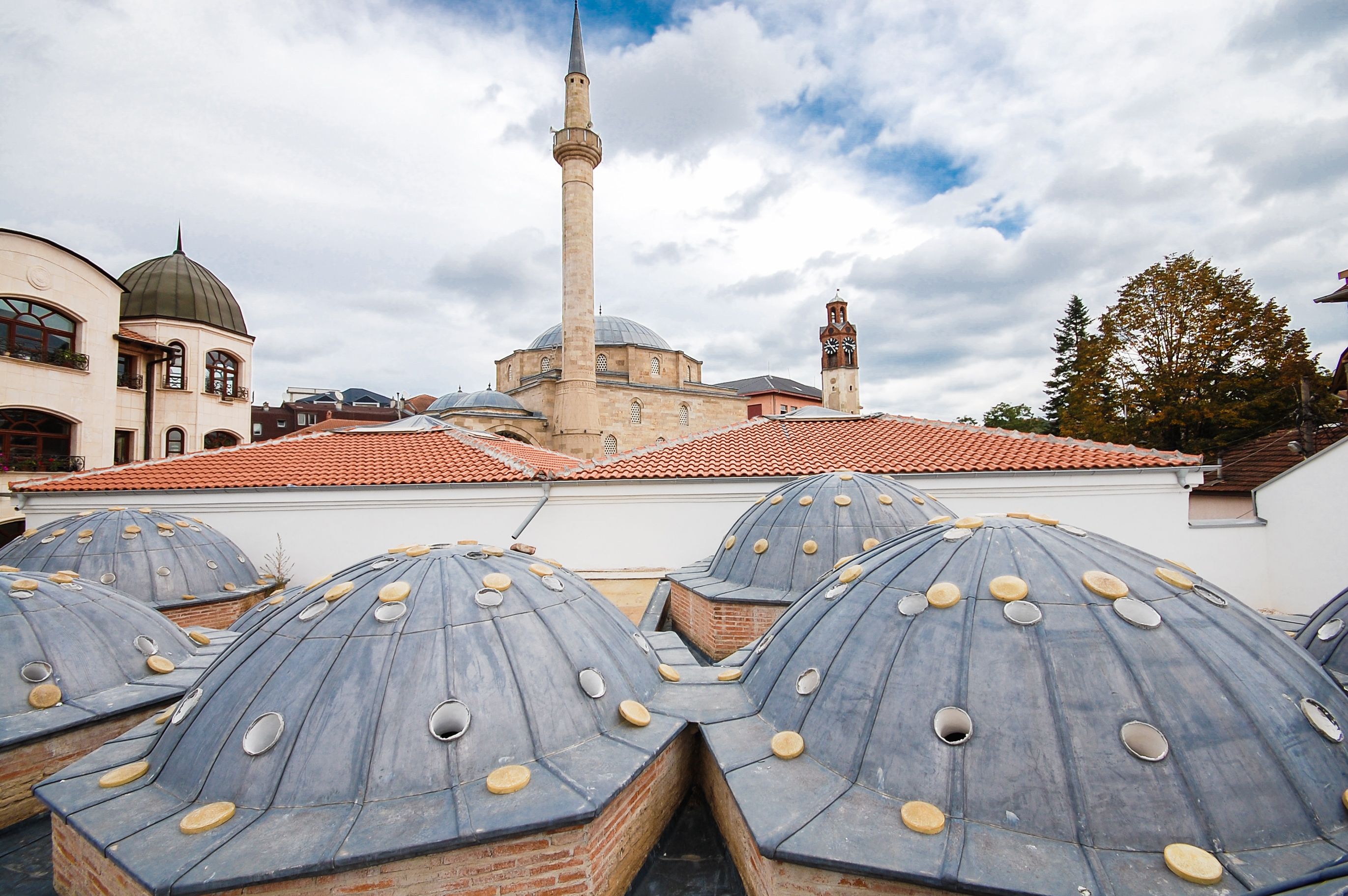
Pristina and the great Hammam

The Great Hammam dates back to the 15th century. It used to be part of the complex of the Sultan Murat Fatih Mosque and according to the legend, the construction workers who were hired to build Fatih Mosque were ordered by Sultan Mehmet II to take daily baths in the hammam. It had two symmetrical baths, one for women and the other one for men. The hammam is composed of 15 domes with small holes which are used to let the light penetrate in. A fire that occurred in 1994, resulted with an illegal opening of three shops which blocked the old entrance. Unfortunately, a hammam that once used to be a prestigious social venue for men and women, for many years looked abandoned with only few remaining walls full of rubbish, overgrown trees and wastewaters flowing inside of the building. However, the complex underwent through a restoration process.

==== Shadërvan ====
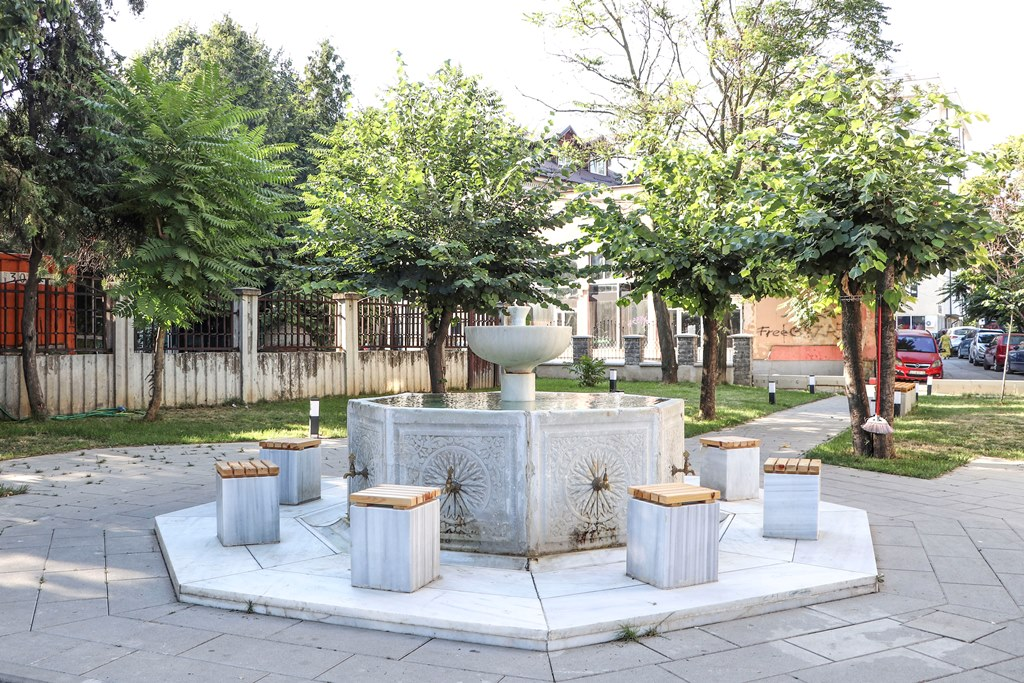
Shadërvan in the Ottoman quarter of Pristina, Kosovo

Shadërvan is a marble fountain located between the Carshi Mosque and the Museum of Kosovo and is a typical component of Ottoman architecture. The fountain is the only one remaining in the city from over fifty that once existed. In addition to providing a source of drinkable water, Shadërvan has been traditionally used for ritual ablution.

=== Cultural houses ===
==== Museum of Kosovo ====
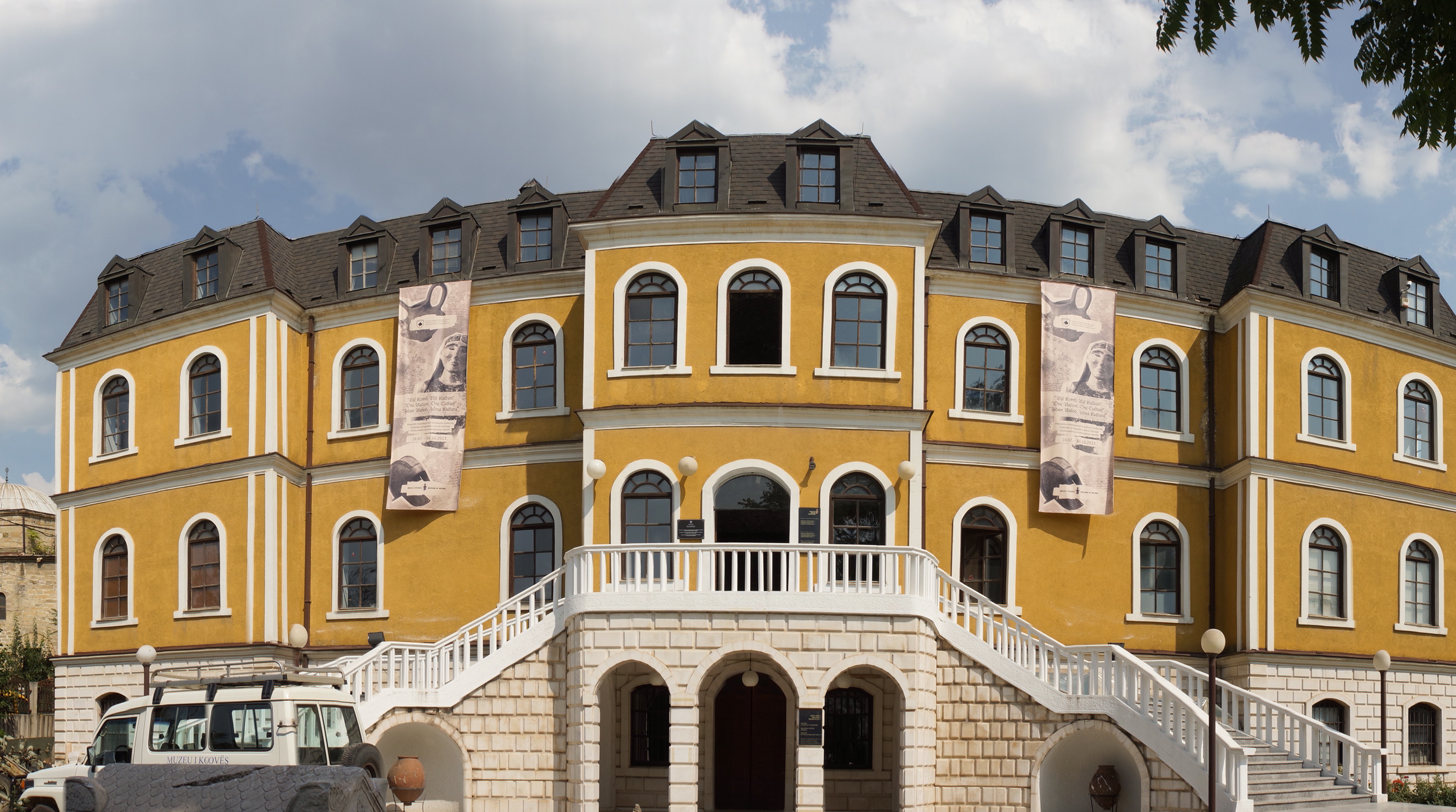
National Museum of Kosovo

The Kosovo Museum was once the seat of the vilayet of Kosovo, while now is housed in an Austro-Hungarian architecture yellow building. It was built by the Austrian occupants for the Turkish Army in 1898. From the 1950s and onwards, it underwent through different changes and served different purposes prior to becoming a museum. In this context, from 1945 to 1975 it served as the base of the Yugoslav National Army. In 1963, it was sold to the Museum of Kosovo and from 1995 to 2002, it was used as the main office for the European Agency for Reconstruction. The museum is full of rich collections of the prehistoric era. One of the most prominent piece is a small (no more than 30 cm tall) statue called “The Goddess on Throne”. The object is believed to be 6000 years old and was found in a site called “Tjerrtorja”near Pristina. in 1956 Just before the onset of the Kosovo War in 1998, the statue was unwillingly taken to Belgrade along with 1,247 other artefacts. In May 2002, by the intervention of the UN, the “Goddess on Throne” was returned to Pristina.

==== Ethnological Museum "Emin Gjiku" ====
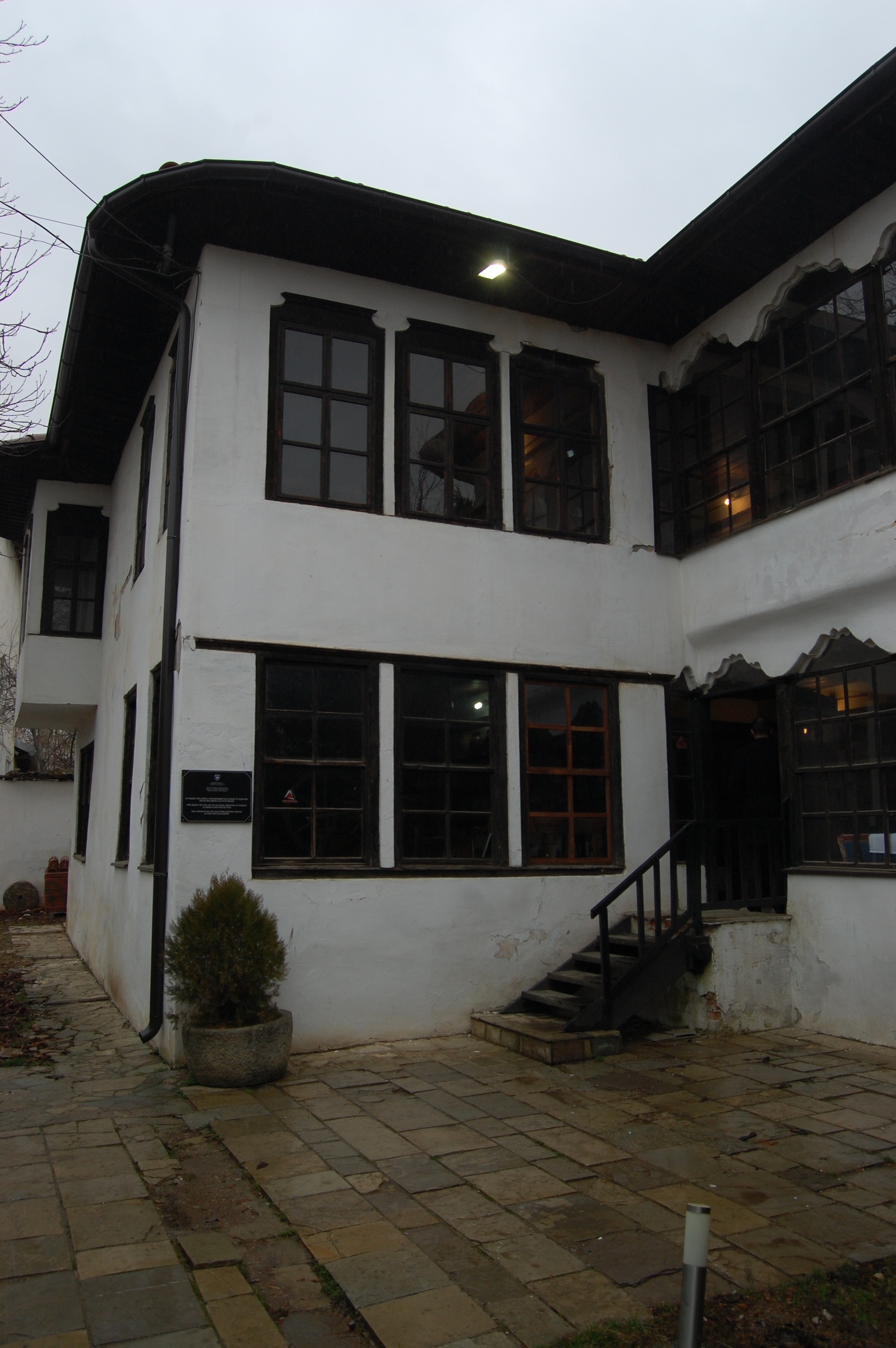
Ethnological Museum "Emin Gjiku"

Set in the old quarter of Pristina, the Ethnological Museum “Emin Gjiku” is a typical example of the Ottoman influence in the city and is included in the cultural heritage of the city. The complex features several buildings which now showcase exhibitions of various cultural artifacts. The complex once belonged to Emin Gjinolli (Turkish Emin Kücük); literally, ‘little Emin’ - who was a member of one of the most recognized families of Pristina in the 20th century. It has been protected by law since 1957, while it was only turned into an ethnological museum in 2006 after undergoing through a restoration process. The Ethnological Museum “Emin Gjiku” is composed of a traditional guest house, an arts studio, a family home and a permanent ethnological exhibition. The latter one showcases clothing items and artifacts related to birth, wedding and funeral ceremonies.

==== Kosovo Institute for the Preservation of Cultural Monuments ====
Kosovo Institute for the Preservation of Cultural Monuments, also known as Kocadishi House, is an Ottoman merchant's home that features a veranda on the first floor and high walls for business and family purposes, which belonged to the Kocadishi family in 1954. The family migrated to Turkey as a result of a special treaty between Yugoslavia and Turkey in 1953. The house, which has survived and is close to the city's old clock tower, is now being used by the Kosovo Institute for the Protection of Monuments.

==== Hivzi Sylejmani library ====
The exact year of the establishment of the "Hivzi Sylejmani" library is not confirmed; it is believed to have begun its work in February 1945. At the time of the inauguration, approximately 1,300 books were available in the Serbian and Albanian language.

The library has been in its present location only since 1947, whereas the building itself was built in 1930. The building is also notable because Miladin Popović, the former leader of Kosovo's Regional Committee who was murdered in 1945, was accommodated in this house. "Hivzi Sylejmani" library was officially and legally established in April 1963 by the Municipal Assembly of Pristina.

Its name changed several times: at some point, it was referred to as the “People's Library”; then, as the "Public Library Miladin Popović"; later as the "City Library" and so on. During the 1990s, this library faced many difficulties, especially political ones during the time when Dragolub Petrović acted as the head of the Library.

Before 1992, there were approximately 130,611 available books, whilst in 1999 the number decreased to 62,274, of which 38,153 were in Serbian, 19,726 in Albanian, 3,274 in Turkish and 1,121 in other foreign languages. After the end of the Kosovo War, the Library started to recover which also resulted with the opening of its chain all over Kosovo.

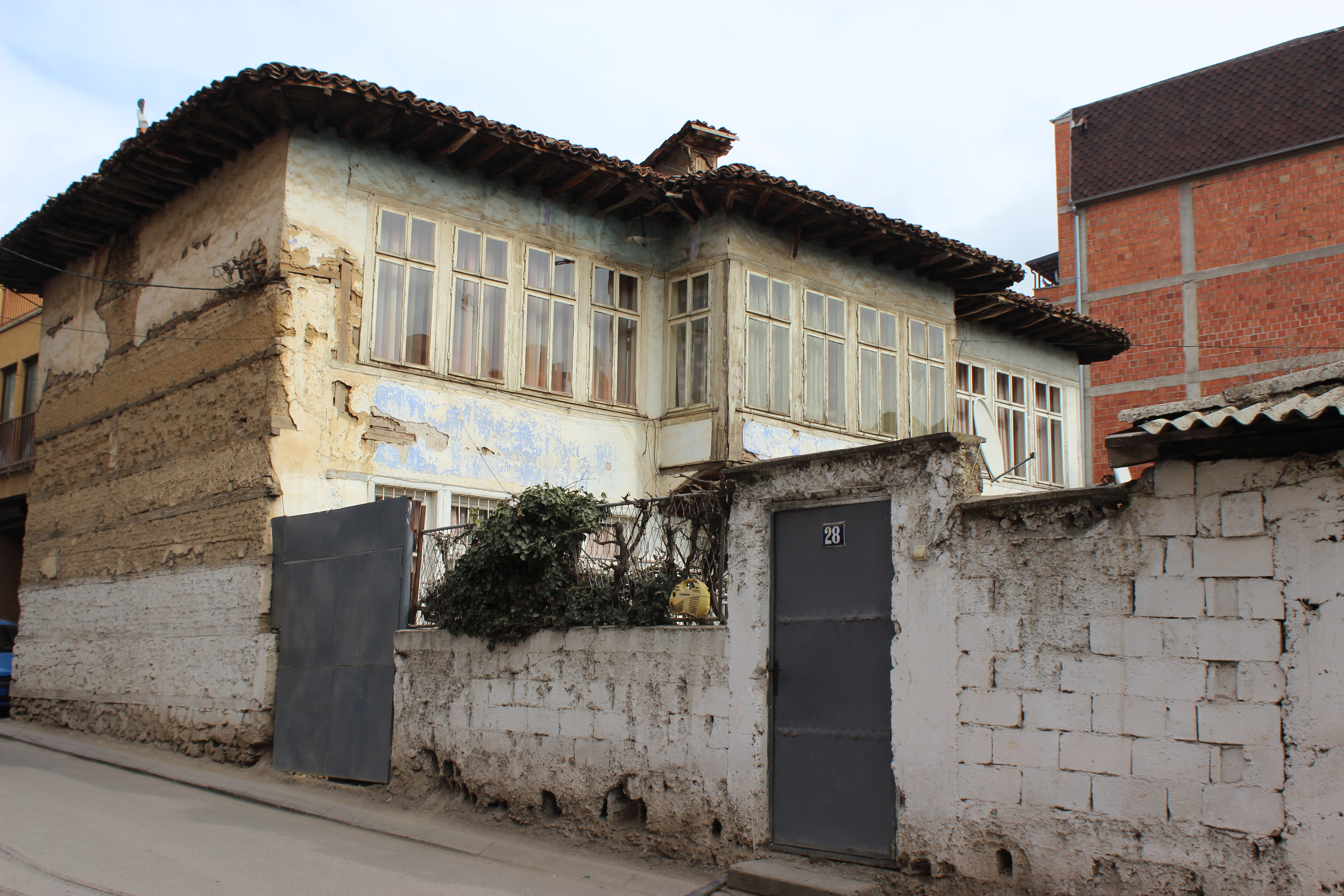
Hynyler House

==== The Hynyler House ====
The Hynyler House symbolizes a typical Ottoman konak. It is a private house, which has been under the list of the protected monuments since 1967 and the family living there have been trying to take their house off this list.

=== Others ===
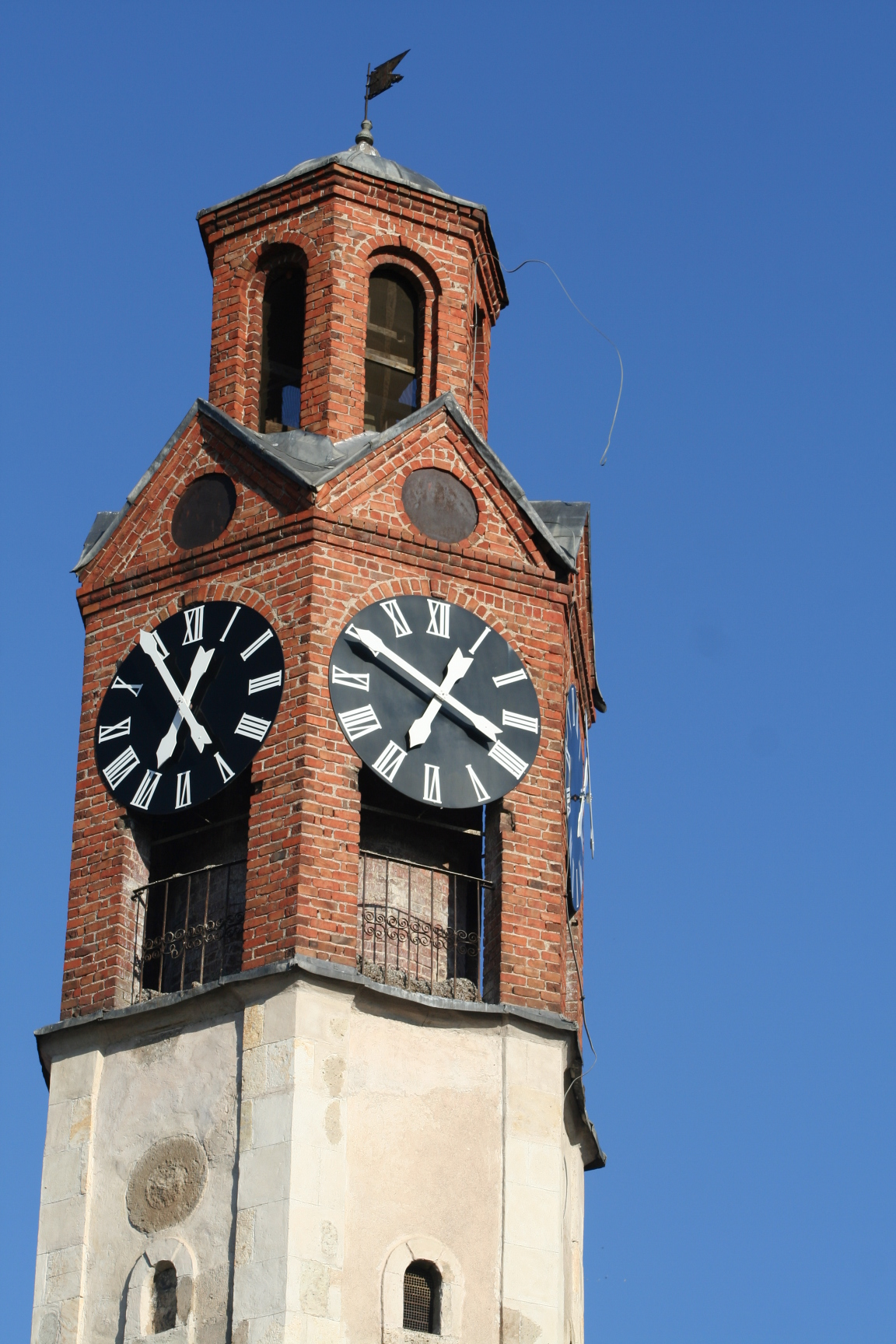
Clock Tower-Sahat Kulla

==== Clock Tower ====
The Clock Tower was built in the 19th century by Jashar Pasha. It served as a means of informing the town during the Ottoman Empire rule, in order to let people know when to pray as well as the traders closing their shops. The 26-meter high hexagonal clock tower was made of sandstone and bricks. The original tower was burned in fire and its bricks were used for reconstruction. The authentic bell was brought from Moldova and had the inscription “This bell was produced in 1764 for Jon Moldova Rumenin” However, the circumstances of how the bell was brought to Pristina are not clearly known; its theft in 2001 is even more unclear The same year, French KFOR troops assisted in installing a new clock by changing the old clock mechanism with an electric one.

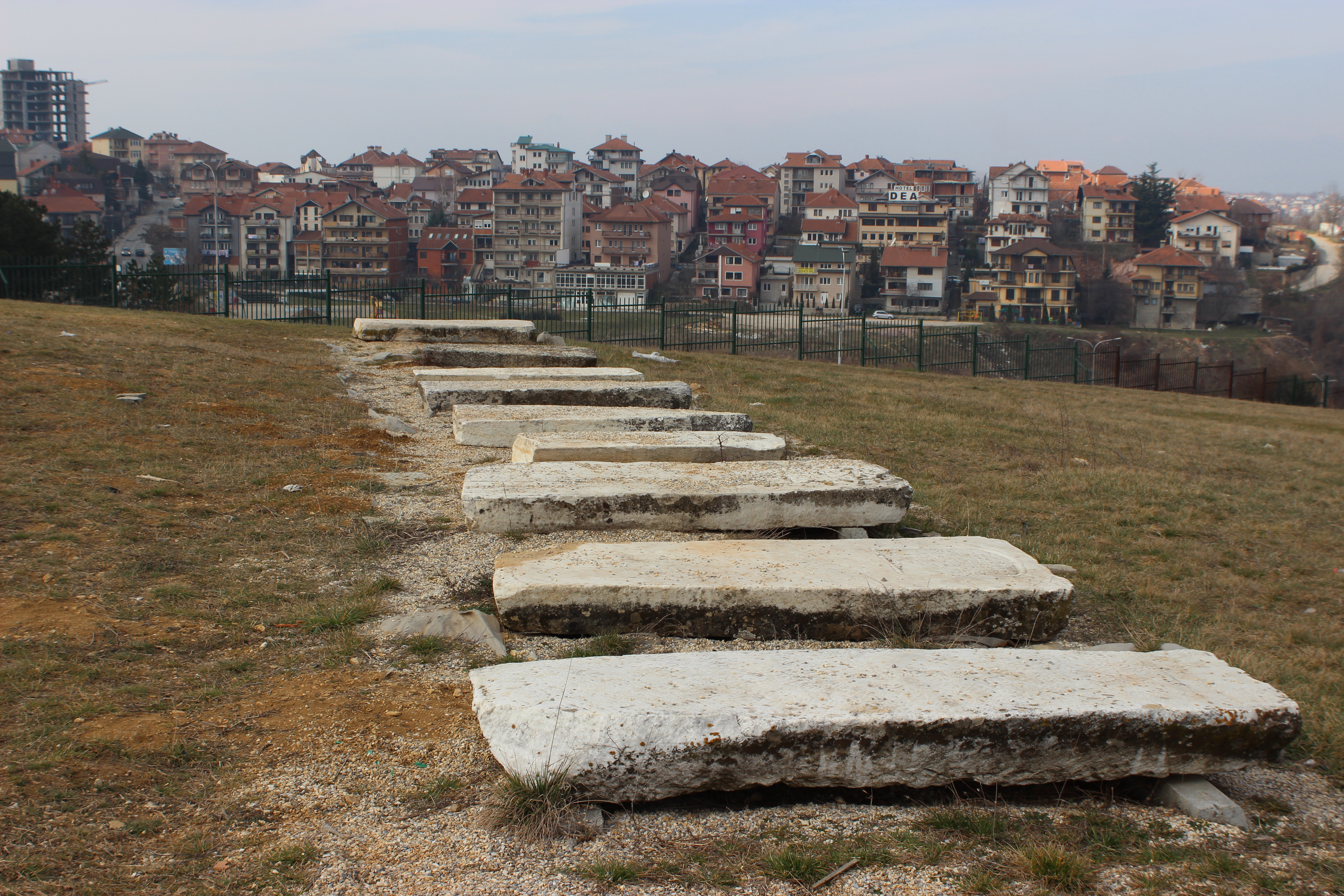
Jewish cemetery

==== Jewish cemetery ====
The Jewish cemetery, which dates back to the 19th century, is a burial site in the outskirts of Pristina consisting of 57 tombstones. The city was once home to a Jewish community numbering over 1,500 people, who settled in the Balkans during the late 15th century from Spain after escaping the Reconquista. Up until 2011, the cemetery was in a devastating condition due to neglect; it was then restored by a team of international and Kosovan university students, but it was afterwards vandalized by unknown subjects. This attack was condemned by several local and international institutions.

==== Tjerrtorja ====
Tjerrtorja was a Neolithic settlement which was identified accidentally in the 1950s somewhere around the outskirts of Pristina. The Neolithic site was named after the discovery place, where a factory was started to be built known as the cotton and textile production plant Tjerrtorja. The area was believed to have had an abundant collection of terracotta figurines, human shaped statues and baked clay anthropomorphic artifacts. One of the most impressive terracotta figurines which has been discovered after some continuous excavation within this area was called “The Goddess on Throne”.

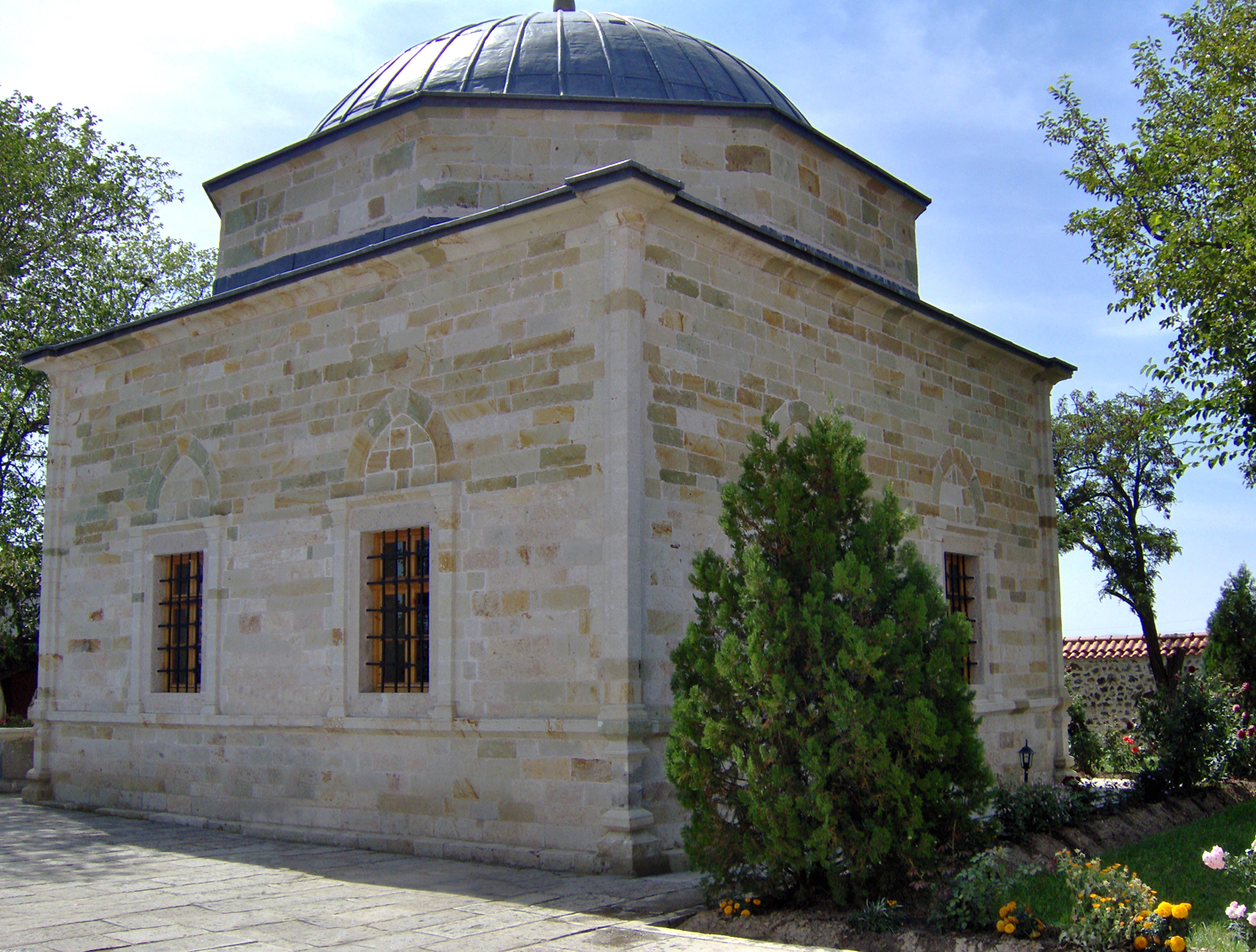
Mausoleum of Sultan Murat I

==== Mausoleum of Sultan Murat I ====
The Mausoleum of Sultan Murat I, also known as Bajraktari Türbe, is a religious object built in honour of Sultan Murat I, who was killed in the Battle of Kosovo in 1389. The building constructed in 1850, does not actually contain the remains of Sultan Murat since they have been moved to the imperial museum in Bursa, Turkey. It is currently in a bad state since it was heavily damaged during the Kosovo War. In addition to a garden, there is little to see inside of the building; an important feature of the garden is a 700‑year‑old mulberry tree which survived from the war. A small group of people from Pristina who follow the Sadije Dervish order, of which Sultan Murat's standard- bearer is believed to have been a member, try to look after and to keep the building protected from the further decay.

== Transformed monuments ==
=== Former Hotel Union building ===
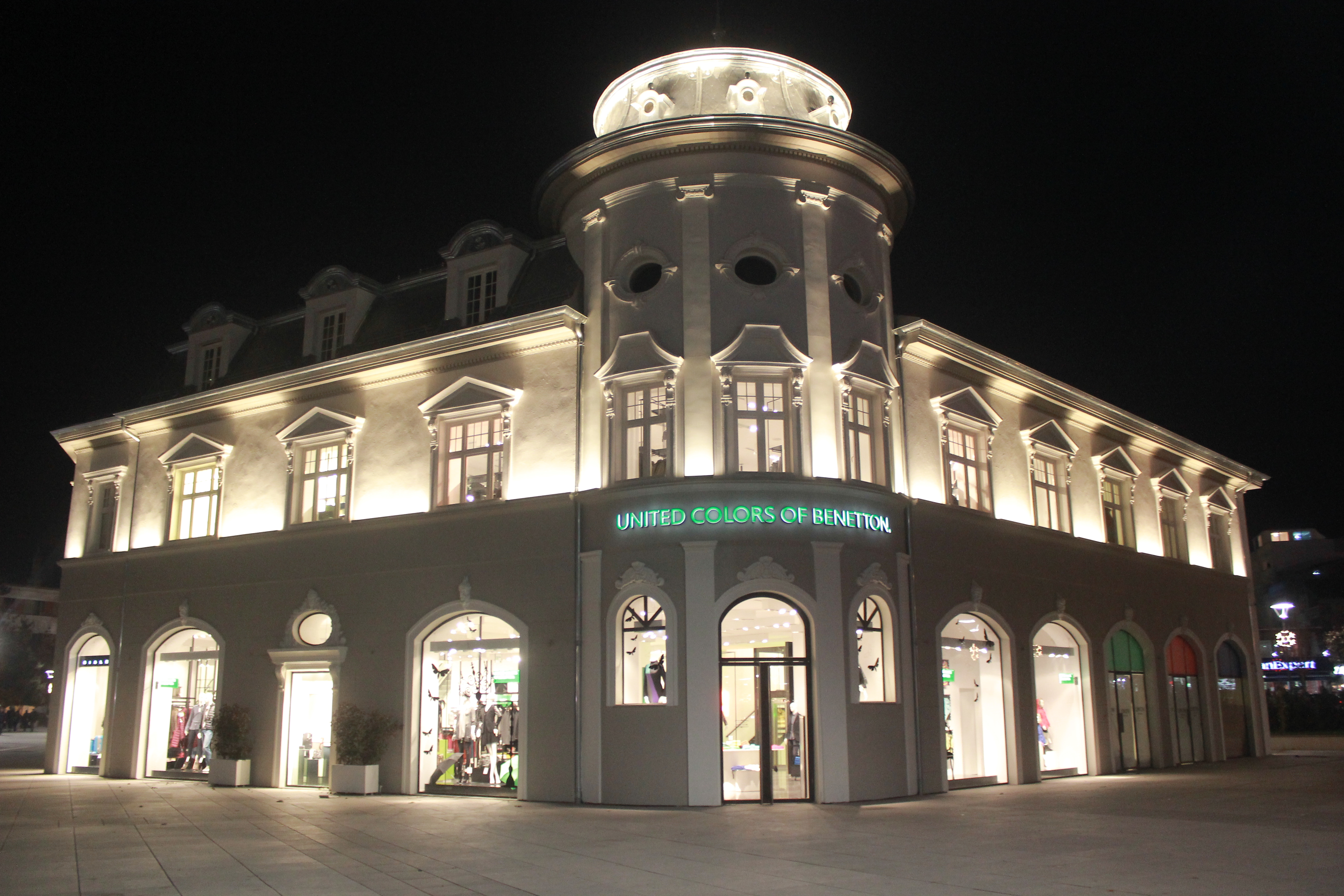
The restored Hotel Union

The building of the former “Hotel Union” was built in 1927 under the supervision of the Austrian architect, Andrija Kremer. It combined elements of neo-Renaissance, neo-baroque and Art Nouveau and was one of the few buildings in Pristina with European-architecture influence. During the first few decades of its existence, it was named “Hotel Skënderbeu” after the 15th century Albanian resistance leader, Skanderbeg and this was witnessed by his ingrained icons on the building. After World War II, the building was nationalized by the government and was renamed as “Hotel Union”. The discussions for the future of the building sparked in 2008 when the Municipality of Pristina announced its intentions of flattening the building of the former “Hotel Union”, under the pretense that it did not possess any noteworthy architectural value and that it should make way for the new boulevard “Ibrahim Rugova” that was to be built. This was confirmed by some experts who assessed that about 80% of the historical values had been irreversibly damaged. This was met with objections by groups who advocated for its restoration to its original state. Also, the Institute for the Protection of Monuments of Kosovo voiced its recommendation for the immediate restoration on a publication. The condition of the building was further worsened when it was set on fire in 2009. A homeless man was shortly after arrested under the suspicion of committing this crime. The confusion appeared to be finally solved in 2010, when the Council of Kosovo for Cultural Heritage announced its agreement with the Italian fashion retailer The United Colors of Benetton to restore the building to a near-original state. After the restoration works were completed in 2013, The United Colors of Benetton inaugurated a 2,000 square meters store in the premises of the renovated building of former “Hotel Union”.

=== Monuments no longer existing ===
==== Old Hammam ====
The Old Hammam belongs to those cultural monuments that have been collapsed throughout times but are still remembered as objects with tremendous impacts in a country's historical culture. According to some sources, the hammam was built in the 15th century around the same time as the Great Hammam. Currently, there is nothing left from it and even its ruins that were discovered closed to today's government building, have been covered rapidly by former town planners.

==== Carshi ====
The old bazaar belongs to the old unsustainable structures which were demolished during war conflicts. The bazaar, which was ravaged in 1953, was situated in the heart of the old city of Pristina. It had more than 300 shops as well as other objects such as: the mosque, the main Christian church, the old Ottoman hammam, a synagogue and a huge number of houses belonging to the old Ottoman architecture.

== Current state ==
=== Restoration ===
Several of the historical monuments in Pristina have undergone through an irregular restoration process, whose aim was to preserve the cultural and historical heritage of the city. Among these, the Sultan Mehmet Fatih Mosque, the Carshi Mosque, the Saint Nicholas Church, the clock tower, the Jewish cemetery all underwent through separate processes of renovation and revitalization throughout their years of existence. The restoration was conducted throughout different periods and by different institutions or individuals. In this regard, the Sultan Mehmet Fatih Mosque was restored by Sultan Mehmet IV in the late 17th century, the Saint Nicholas Church with financial means of the European Union and the Jewish cemetery by university students. In addition, the renovation of the Carshi Mosque was conducted by the Municipality of Pristina and its investment reached figures as high as half a million euros.

=== Great Hammam ===
The process of the restoration of the Great Hammam initially began in 2007 and was initiated by the Municipality of Pristina and the Cultural Heritage without Borders office in Kosovo. The total investment made in the restoration process is estimated to have been in the region of 700 thousand euros and this was divided into three phases. These consisted of investigation and assessment, structural restoration and attempts for re-functioning. The Great Hammam was inaugurated in October 2013, despite the fact that restoration was still undergoing at that time. There were attempts to open a museum showcasing neolithic artifacts from Pristina and the region and an arts gallery inside the hammam. However, the restoration process was met with controversy by some officials and governmental institutions of Kosovo. In this sense, the Ministry of Culture of Kosovo put a halt to the renovation process in February 2013 due to their questioning of the construction material used. The works were restarted in May 2013 after a commission recommended that the material be replaced with a mixture that was closer to the authentic one. Moreover, officials of the Kosovo Council for Cultural Heritage criticized the restoration by noting that the renovations during the period of 2009–2013 had damaged the monument. Gjejlane Hoxha, the executive director of this institution stated that the monument was in an improper situation and that its integrity and authenticity were threatened by the aftermaths of the uncontrolled activities of the restoration process and its conversion into a museum of Pristina. Moreover, she stated that if no specific action was to be undertaken to improve the image of this object, she would direct her concern to the Prosecution of Kosovo. She channeled her concern to the Ministry of Culture, Youth and Sports of Kosovo through a written statement, in which she expressed her unsettlement for the conservation process. Furthermore, the entire restoration process was delayed several times; the entire process took over six years to be completed.

== Legislation ==
The boundaries of the old town of Pristina were judicially regulated by the Detailed Urban Plan in 1978 by the Institute of Urban Planning of the Municipality of Pristina. This covered an area of 8,2 ha and according to it, this was the only area in the city which consisted of culturally significant buildings and landmarks. However, the area suffered from illegal constructions that sprang up after the period of the conflict in Kosovo and in order to address this issue, the authorities for urban planning of Pristina approved a strategic plan in 2004. Relying on the Law for Spatial Planning (no. 2003/4) and the Regulation on the Self-Governance of Kosovo Municipalities (no. 2000/45), in 2006 the Municipal Assembly of Pristina initiated a regulatory plan which defined boundaries that comprised an area of 26 ha. This was amended in 2009 by further adding new zones which came up to 42 ha. Moreover, the regulatory plan is expected to be further expanded and improved, as witnessed on the 2012 strategic plan of the Municipality of Pristina.

On the other hand, individual monuments have been protected by law with various decisions and regulations, which were mostly approved in the 1950s and 1960s. The following table indicates the year of the adaptation of judicial means to preserve some of the historical monuments of Pristina:

Name of the monument	Year of approval of the respective protection law
Sultan Mehmet Fatih Mosque	1953
Pirinaz Mosque	1967
Carshi Mosque	1967
Jashar Pasha Mosque	1967
Iconostasis of Saint Nicholas Church and two houses of the Archbishop	1956 and 1961, respectively
Clock tower	1967
Shadërvani	1967
Jewish cemetery	1967
Remains of the foundation of the old hammam	1959
Great Hammam	1985
Tjerrtorja	1955
Museum of Kosovo	1967
Kosovo Institute for the Preservation of Cultural Monuments (Kocandishi house)	1957
Emin Gjiku Complex	1955
“Hivzi Sylejmani” library	1967
Former “Hotel Union” building	1996

== See also ==
- Monuments of Kosovo
- Cultural heritage of Kosovo
- Ottoman architecture

== Bibliography ==
- Warrander, Gail, and Verena Knaus. Kosovo. Chalfont St. Peter, Bucks: Bradt Travel Guides, 2010. Print.
- Drançolli, Fejaz. Monumentet E Prishtines. Prishtinë: Oferta Suksesi, 2004. Print.
- Balla, Shefqet. Kosova Guide. Prishtinë: Abs, n.d. Print.
- Luzhnica, Donika and Jonas König (eds.). Prishtina in 53 Buildings. Munich: Sorry Press, 2022.
