= Çarshi Mosque =

Mosque in Pristina, Kosovo

- Xhamia e Çarshisë
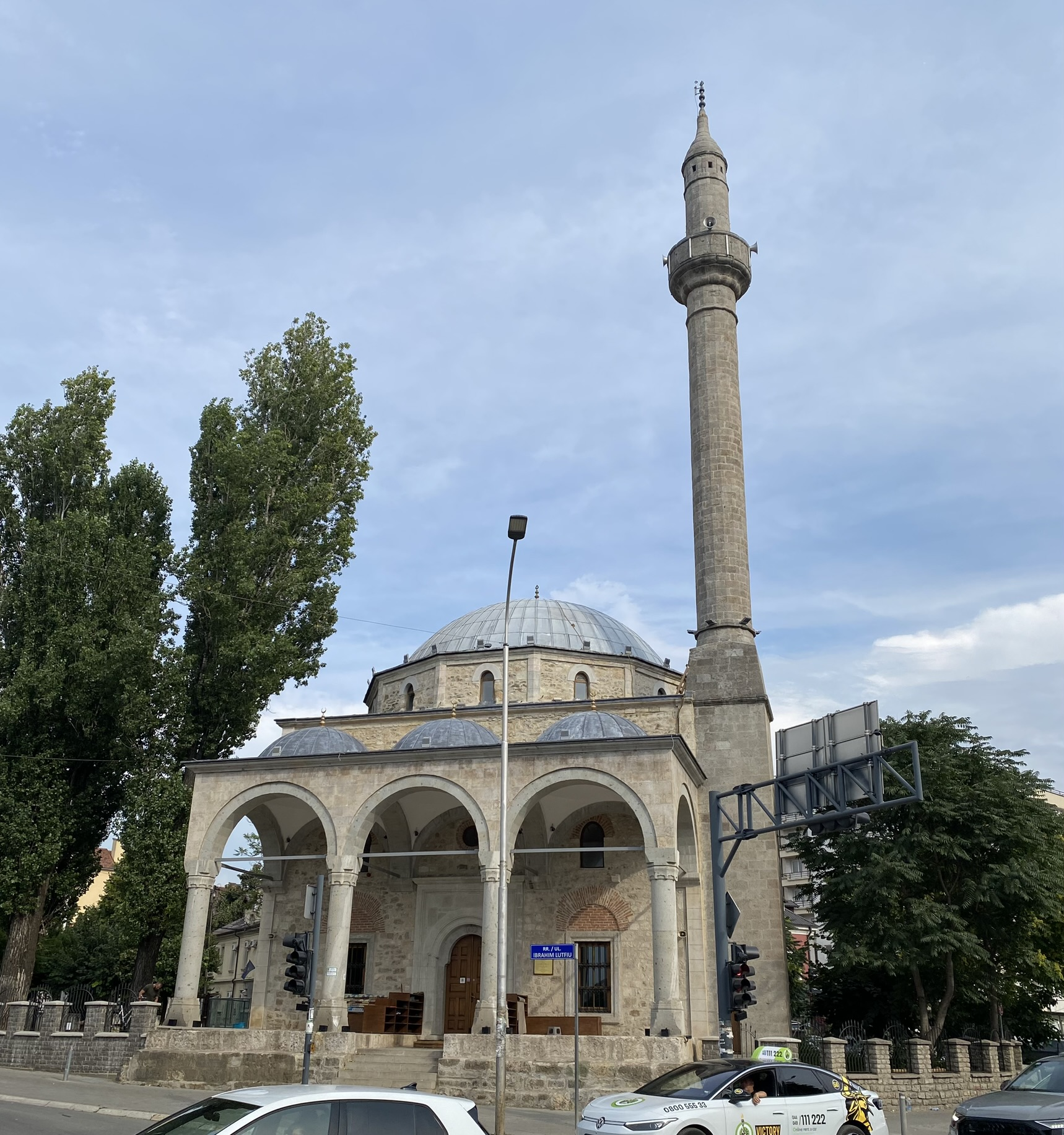

Religion
- Affiliation: Sunni Islam

Location
- Location: Pristina
- Country: Kosovo
- Interactive map of Çarshi Mosque
- Coordinates: 42°39′55″N 21°9′55″E

Architecture
- Type: Mosque
- Style: Ottoman
- Completed: 1389; 637 years ago
- Cultural Heritage under Permanent Protection
- Official name: Xhamia e Çarshisë
- Type: Architectural Heritage: Monument/Ensemble
- Reference no.: 2782

The Çarshi Mosque, also known as the Bazaar Mosque and the Taş Mosque (literally, the Stone Mosque) (Albanian: Xhamia e Çarshisë), is the oldest building in Pristina, Kosovo, and it marks the beginning of the old town. The foundation of this mosque was laid out in 1389 during the rule of the Ottoman Sultan Bayezid I and its construction was continued during the reign of Sultan Murad II in the 15th century. The Çarshi Mosque was built to celebrate the Ottoman victory of 1389 in the Battle of Kosovo. Over the years, the mosque has undergone through several restorations. However, its stone-topped minaret has survived for over six centuries (hence, it is often referred to as the Taş Mosque, or the Stone Mosque).

== Architecture and design ==
The Çarshi Mosque is a prime example of early Ottoman imperial architecture in Kosovo. It features a classical square plan consisting of three main elements: a central prayer hall, a portico, and a minaret. The prayer hall is crowned by a dome that rests on pendentives, creating the mosque's distinctive silhouette. The building is illuminated through a carefully designed system of windows arranged in three tiers: quadratic windows in the first row, arched windows in the second row and drum, and an oculus on each side of the structure. This arrangement allows natural light to filter into the prayer space throughout the day.

Following a 2011 restoration, the mosque's formerly enclosed two-story portico (previously covered with three hip roofs) was transformed into an open portico crowned by three smaller domes. This modification restored elements of its original Ottoman architectural character.

The minaret, positioned on the right side of the mosque, is particularly known for its construction technique. It features a slim, polygonal design with regular rectangular stones used consistently from its base to its spire—a distinctive feature that earned the building its "Stone Mosque" nickname. The minaret's components include a footing, pulpit, transition segment, shaft, balcony, upper shaft, and spire topped with an ornamental finial.

== Interior features ==
The interior of the Çarshi Mosque is characterized by rich decorative elements that reflect traditional Ottoman sacred art. The mihrab (prayer niche indicating the direction of Mecca) is the most elaborately decorated element, featuring a colourful niche adorned with muqarnas (honeycomb or stalactite-like decorative elements).

Other interior features include:

- A stone minbar (pulpit) positioned to the right of the mihrab
- A conic-shaped kursi (chair or platform) attached to the corner of the prayer hall
- A muezzin mahfil (a dikka, or platform for the prayer caller) located in front of the mihrab on a slightly raised platform
- A women's gallery supported by four wooden pillars positioned above the muezzin mahfil

The prayer hall is further enhanced with fresco secco decorations featuring arabesques, geometric patterns, and floral motifs painted in light tones of blue, green, purple, and ocher against a light blue background. These decorations are concentrated around the windows, pendentives, drum, and central rosette in the dome—a decorative scheme typical of Ottoman mosques in Kosovo.

== Historical significance ==
The Çarshi Mosque holds particular historical importance as one of three imperial mosques commissioned by Mehmed II the Conqueror in Kosovo, alongside the Fatih Mosque in Pristina and the Bajrakli Mosque in Peja. As the first imperial Ottoman building in Kosovo, it represents the introduction of Islamic architectural traditions to the region and served as a model for subsequent religious structures. The mosque functioned as a nucleus for urban development during the Ottoman period, helping to shape the growth and character of old Pristina around it.

== See also ==
- Architecture of Kosovo
- Islam in Kosovo
- Religion in Kosovo
