= Gazi Mehmet Pasha's Mosque =

Mosque in Prizren, Kosovo

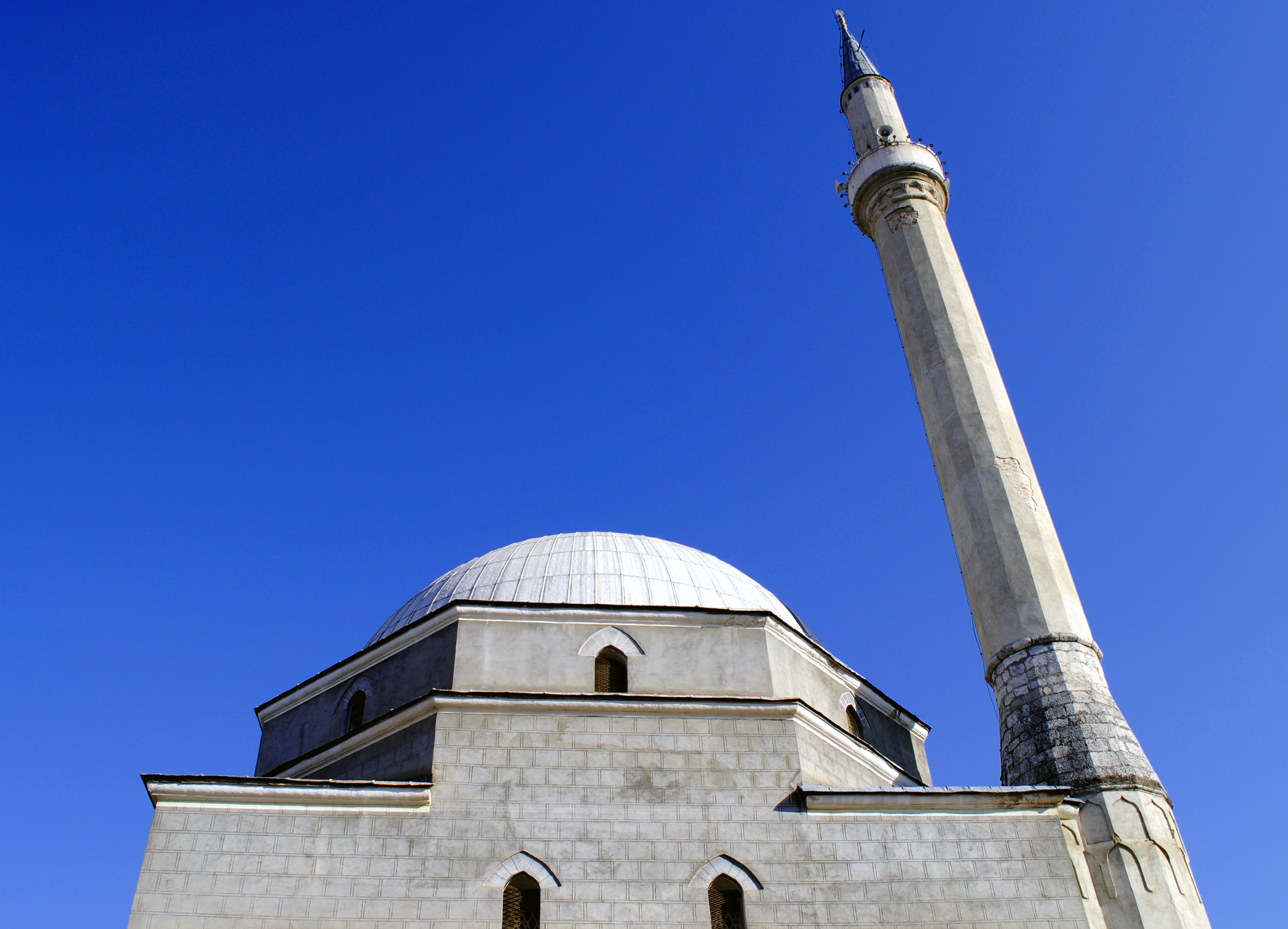

Religion
- Affiliation: Islam

Location
- Municipality: Prizren
- Country: Kosovo
- Interactive map of Gazi Mehmet Pasha's Mosque
- Coordinates: 42.2063°N 20.7309°E

Architecture
- Type: Ottoman
- Completed: 1573; 453 years ago
- Materials: stone

Gazi Mehmet Pasha's Mosque (Albanian: Xhamia e Gazi Mehmet Pashës) also known as the Bajrakli Mosque (Albanian: Xhamia e Bajraklisë) is a mosque in the city of Prizren. It is one of the oldest Islamic religious sites in Kosovo. Building started in 1561 and finished in 1573. Its building is part of a complex which included the mosque, a library, a maktab and madrasa, public baths, housing and other buildings in a radius of about 150m. The present-day League of Prizren museum was one of its buildings. The complex stands on the other side of the Lumbardhi i Prizrenit river opposite to the Prizren Fortress. The mosque has a square base and numerous windows, while the main mihrab and the mimber are made of marble.

It was built by the waqf of Dukaginzade Gazi Mehmet Pasha, great-grandson of Dukaginzade Ahmed Pasha. His future mausoleum was built in the courtyard of the mosque, but it was never used as he died ca. 1594–96 in Hungary.

== See also ==
- List of monuments in Prizren
- Islam in Kosovo

== Bibliography ==
- Katic, Tatjana (2019). "Osmanizovanje srednjovekovnog grada: Urbani i demografski razvoj Prizrena od polovine XV do kraja XVI veka". Istorijski časopis. 20.
