= Monumental Complex of the Albanian League of Prizren =

Cultural heritage monument of Prizren, Kosovo

- Kompleksi Monumental i Lidhjes Shqiptare të Prizrenit
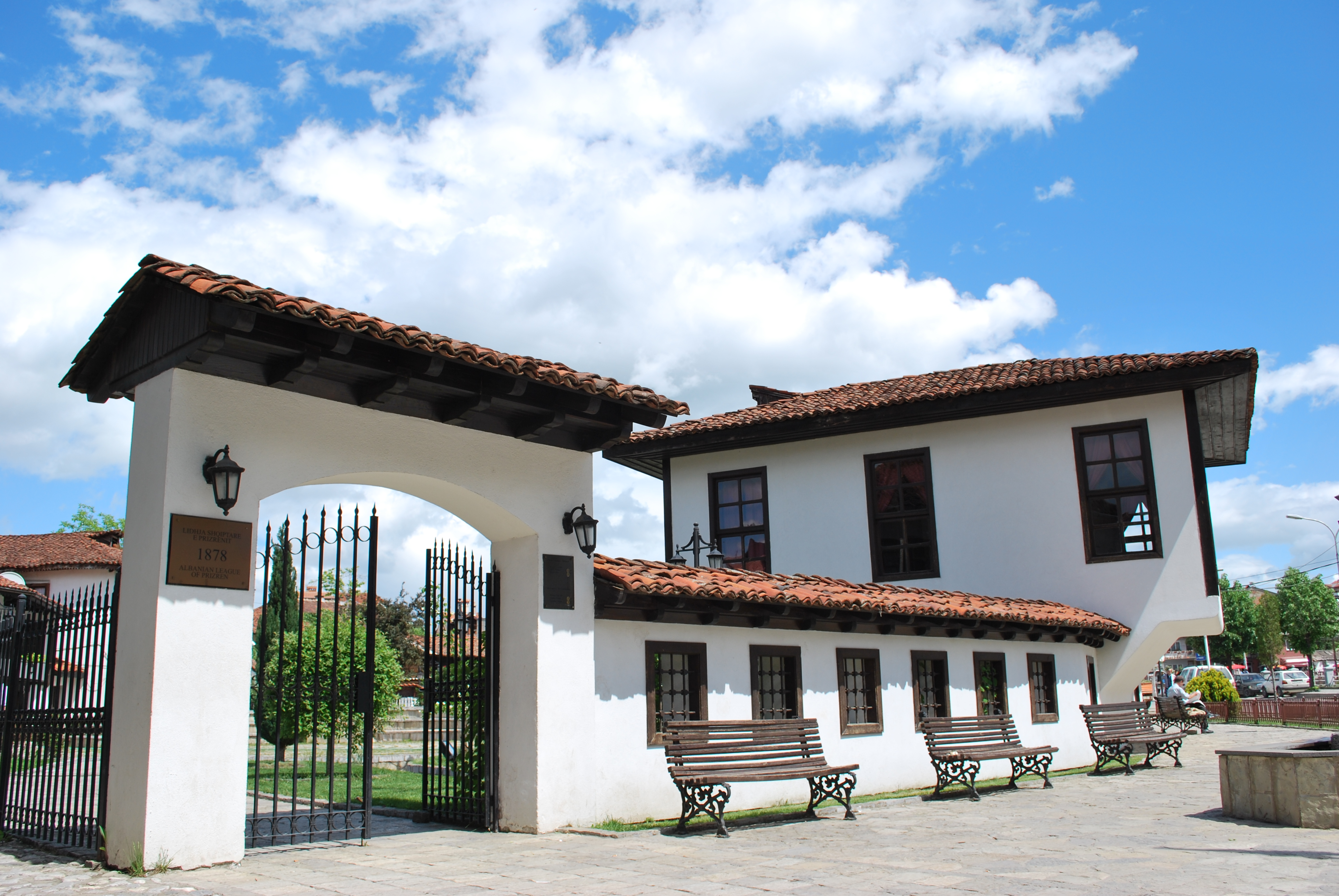
- Established: 1977; 49 years ago
- Location: Prizren, Kosovo
- Coordinates: 42.211467°N 20.743825°E
- Type: Architectural

Cultural Heritage under Permanent Protection
- Official name: Kompleksi Monumental i Lidhjës Shqiptare të Prizrenit
- Type: Architectural Heritage: Monument/Ensemble
- Reference no.: 468

The Monumental Complex of the Albanian League of Prizren is a museum complex and cultural heritage monument located in the historic city of Prizren, Kosovo. This monument belongs to the "architectural" category, approved with number 414/77 and is under state protection. The complex is now home to photographs, documents, objects, clothing and other cultural artifacts that date from the time of the League of Prizren.

== History ==
The Monumental Complex of the Albanian League of Prizren is an urbanistic and architectural ensemble, geographically located in the old city centre, with special cultural, historical, societal and environmental values. The complex was shaped with the construction of the Gazi Mehmet Pasha's Mosque, and around it, other buildings were developed, such as the League Building, the Medrese (School), Library, Turbe and residential buildings, which are mainly spread through the south-western area of the Gazi Mehmed Pasha's Complex, within which we have the Memorial Complex of the Prizren League. These folk architecture buildings are found individually and in series. By the end of the 19th century, and the early 20th century, restoration and reconstruction works in residential buildings clearly feature European Baroque styles, with a hint of Neo-Classicism, which provides a specific image to these buildings.

After the 1950s, mass demolitions were made, in the name of road expansion, and the Lumbardh River was reshaped for “modernizing” the city. From this complex, only a few preserved buildings remain, while some parts of the Medrese (School) were also destroyed. In 1968, due to the road construction, several buildings along the river were demolished, while the residential building of the Albanian League of Prizren was relocated for several meters west. Again, in 1976-’78, major interventions were made, thereby demolishing several buildings in the area of Memorial Complex of the Albanian Prizren League, with aim to reconstruct the Museum of the Prizren League, for its 100th anniversary. During the 1999 war, the League Building was entirely demolished due to fire, and was reconstructed by June 2000.

Now, the Museum Complex of the Prizren League is made of three sectors:

1. The Albanian League of Prizren Residence, a historical sector, with the history of the League, featuring written documents, old weapons and paintings of historical and political figures of the League;
2. The Medrese (School), with an ethnographic sector in its ground floor, characteristic adornments from Albanian-inhabited areas; and
3. The upper floor of Medrese, with the Art Gallery, featuring paintings of the personalities of the Albanian League of Prizren.
