= Medieval Monuments in Kosovo =

UNESCO World Heritage Site in Kosovo

UNESCO World Heritage Site
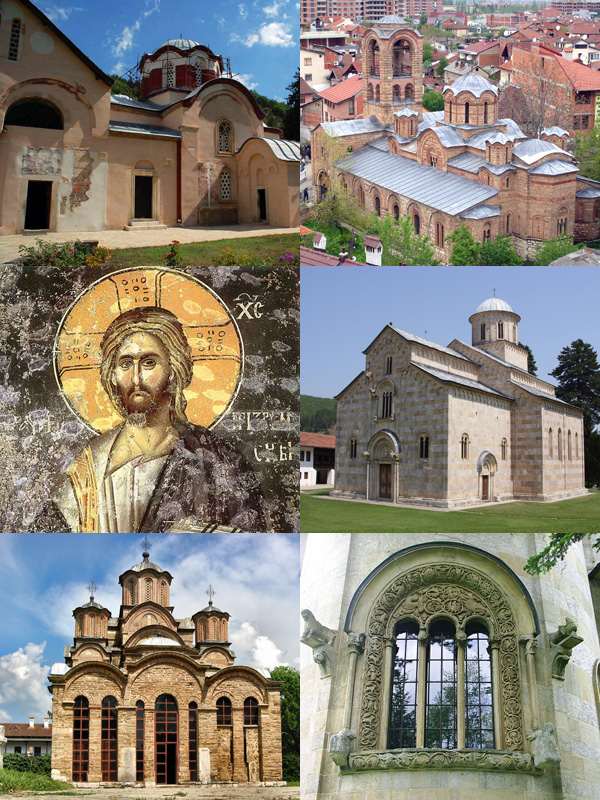
- Clockwise from top left: Church of Patriarchal Monastery of Peć, Our Lady of Ljeviš, Church of Visoki Dečani, a window at Visoki Dečani, Church of Gračanica, fresco of Christ at Our Lady of Ljeviš
- Interactive map of Medieval Monuments in Kosovo
- Location: Kosovo
- Includes: 1. Visoki Dečani Monastery; 2. Patriarchate of Peć Monastery; 3. Our Lady of Ljeviš; 4. Gračanica Monastery
- Reference: 724bis

The Medieval Monuments in Kosovo (Serbian: Средњовековни споменици на Косову, Srednjovekovni spomenici na Kosovu, Albanian: Monumentet Mesjetare në Kosovë) are a World Heritage Site consisting of four Serbian Orthodox Christian churches and monasteries which represent the fusion of the eastern Orthodox Byzantine and the western Romanesque ecclesiastical architecture to form the Palaiologian Renaissance style. The construction was founded by members of Nemanjić dynasty, the most important dynasty of Serbia in the Middle Ages. The sites are located in Kosovo.

In 2004, UNESCO recognized the Dečani Monastery for its outstanding universal value. Two years later, the site of patrimony was extended as a serial nomination, to include three other religious monuments: Patriarchate of Peć Monastery, Our Lady of Ljeviš and Gračanica Monastery.

In 2006 the property was inscribed on the list of World Heritage in Danger due to difficulties in its management and conservation stemming from the region's political instability.

== UNESCO controversy ==
There is an ongoing controversy over Kosovo's bid to join UNESCO, which would result in the sites being listed as part of Kosovo and not Serbia. These monuments have come under attack, especially during the ethnic violence in 2004, during Kosovo's UNMIK rule, when the Our Lady of Ljeviš was heavily damaged. In October 2015 Kosovo was recommended for membership by the UNESCO Executive Board. The bid for membership was voted at the UNESCO General Conference in November 2015.

UNESCO has not accepted Kosovo as a member, the proposal failed to gain a two-thirds majority at the organization's General Conference in Paris on November 9, 2015. One of primary reasons for this rejection of Albanian request is 2004 unrest in Kosovo, when 35 Orthodox churches were desecrated, damaged or destroyed, including Our Lady of Ljeviš which is a World Heritage Site. The church is subject to constant looting, even of its construction material, with valuable lead having repeatedly been stolen from the roof.

== Gallery ==
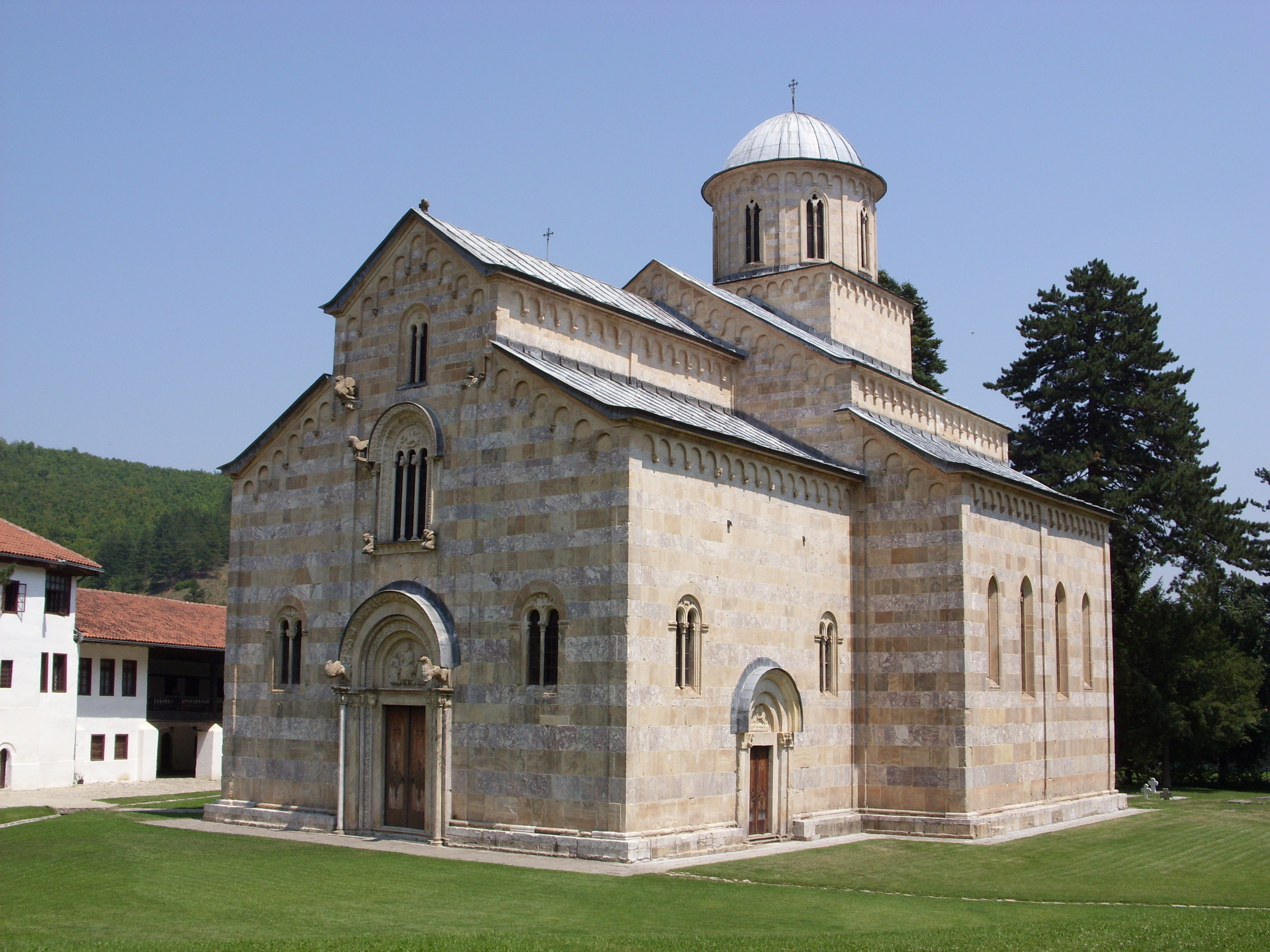
Visoki Dečani

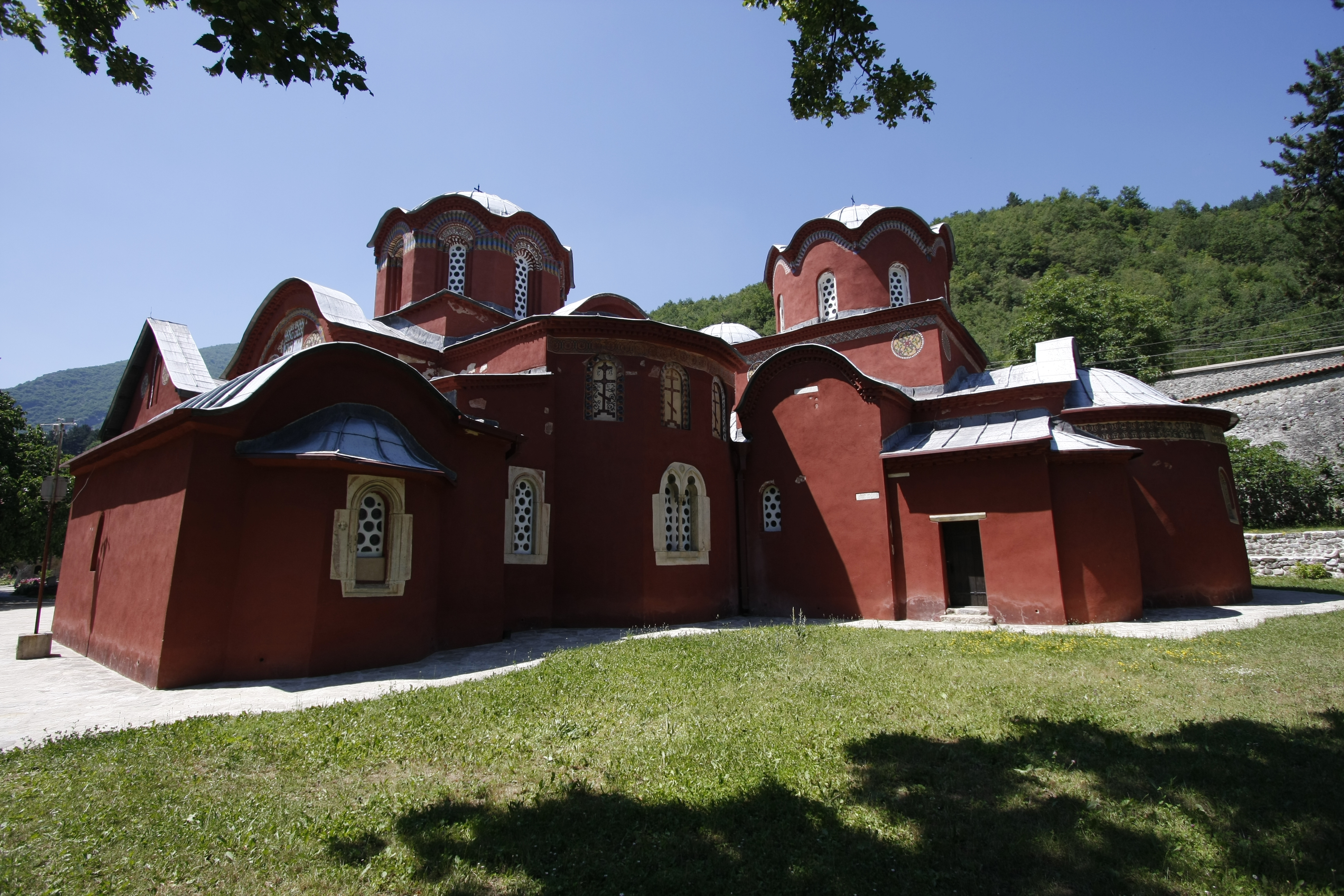
Patriarchal Monastery of Peć

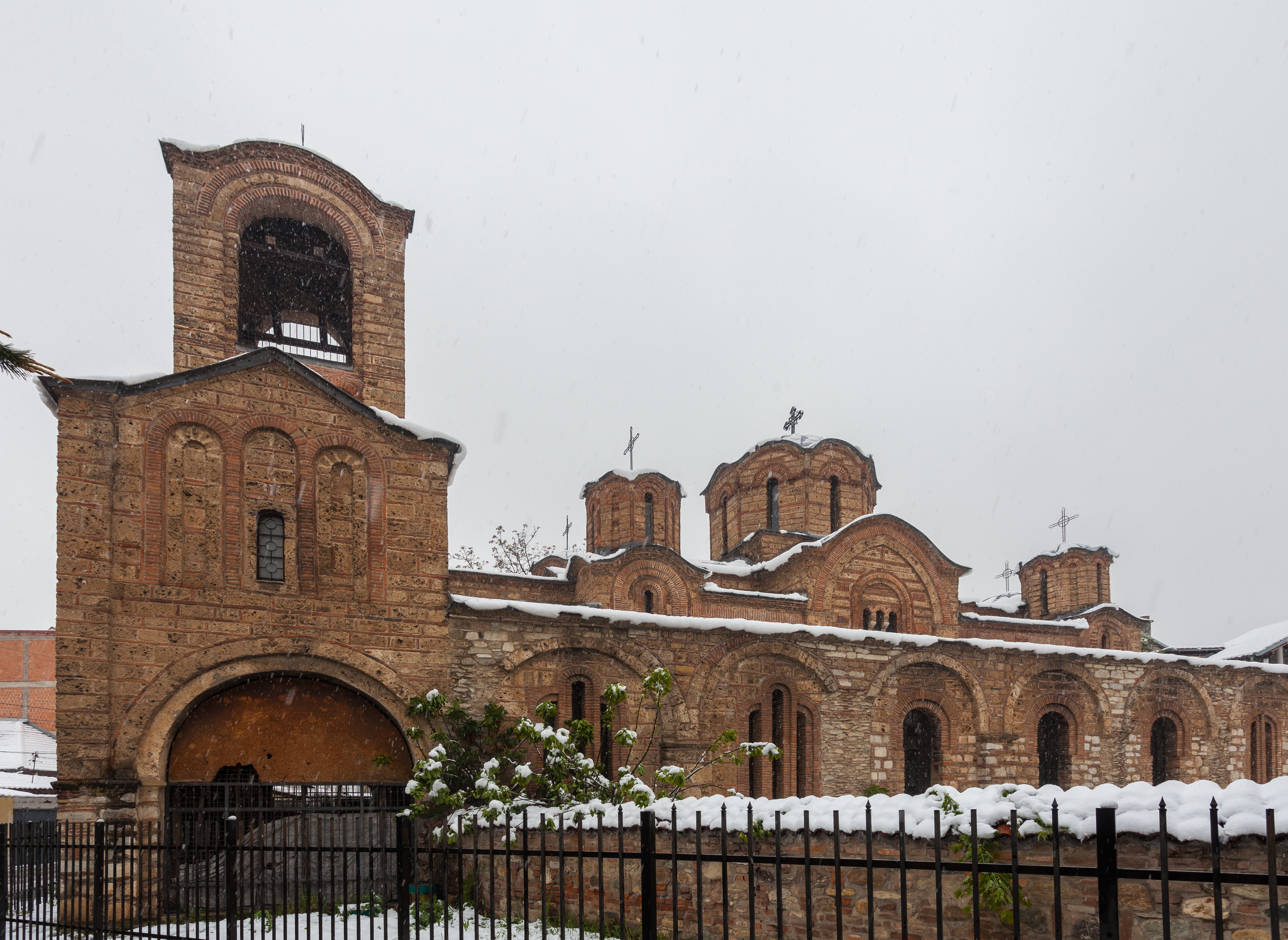
Our Lady of Ljeviš

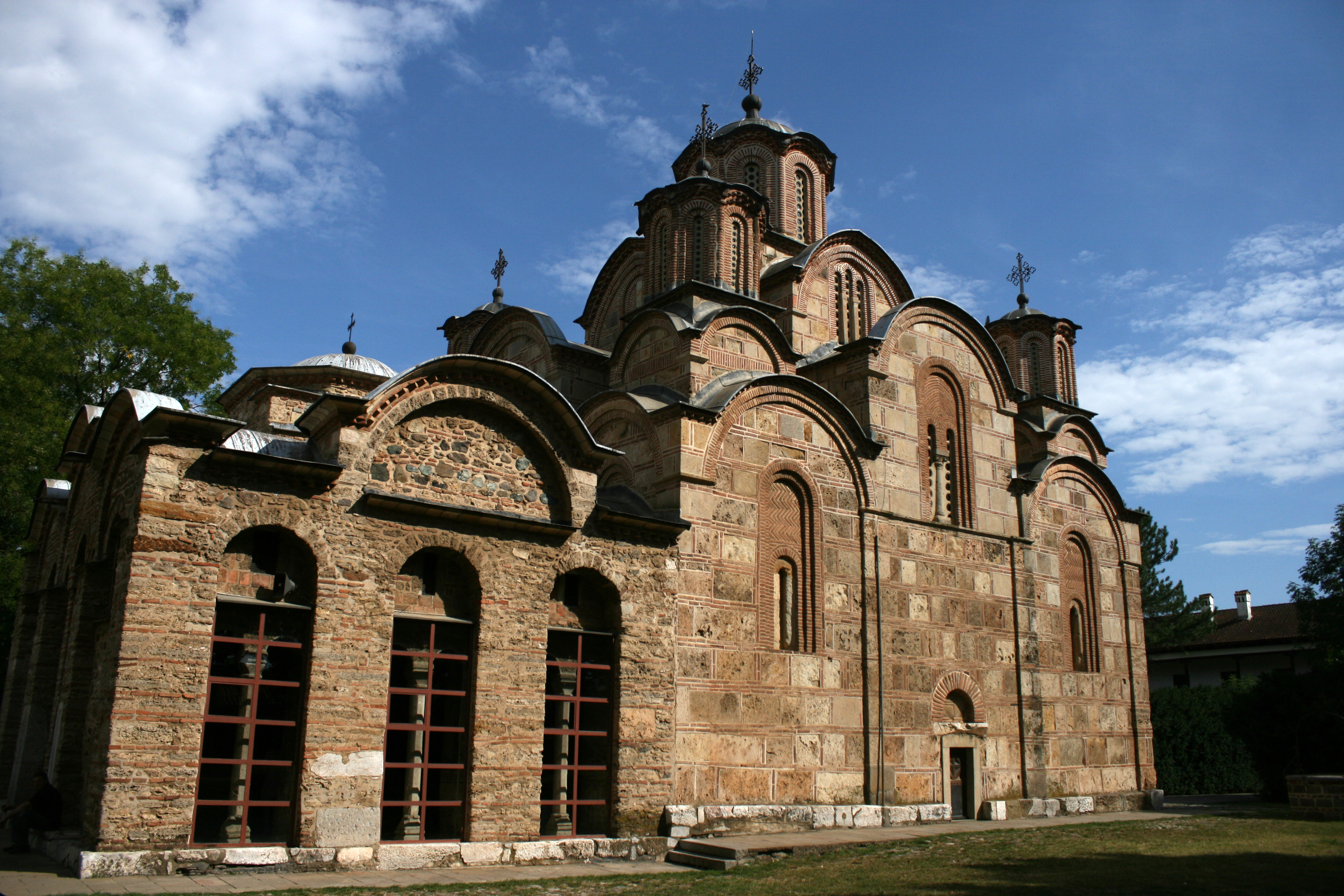
Gračanica

== See also ==
- Kosovo: A Moment in Civilization
- Destruction of Albanian heritage in Kosovo
- Destruction of Serbian heritage in Kosovo
