= Our Lady of Ljeviš =

Serbian Orthodox church in Prizren, Kosovo

- Our Lady of Ljeviš
- 42°12′41″N 20°44′09″E
- Location: Prizren
- Country: Kosovo
- Denomination: Serbian Orthodox

History
- Status: Church
- Founded: 1306–1307
- Founder: Stephen Milutin
- Dedication: Dormition of the Mother of God

Architecture
- Functional status: Semi-active
- Style: Serbo-Byzantine style

Administration
- Diocese: Eparchy of Raška and Prizren

UNESCO World Heritage Site
- Part of: Medieval Monuments in Kosovo
- Criteria: Cultural: ii, iii, iv
- Reference: 724
- Inscription: 2006 (30th Session)
- Endangered: 2006–

Cultural Heritage of Serbia
- Official name: Crkva Bogorodice Ljeviške
- Type: Monument of Culture of Exceptional Importance
- Designated: 11 March 1948
- Reference no.: SK 1369

Cultural Heritage under Permanent Protection
- Official name: Kisha e Levishës - Kisha e Shën Premtës
- Type: Monument/Ensemble
- Criteria: 69/2016 - Special Protection Zone (SPZ)
- Reference no.: 1974

Our Lady of Ljeviš (Serbian: Богородица Љевишка, romanized: Bogorodica Ljeviška; Albanian: Kisha e Shën Premtës) is a 14th-century Serbian Orthodox church in Prizren, Kosovo. Since 2006, the church is part of the UNESCO World Heritage Site named Medieval Monuments in Kosovo.

The church was built in the beginning of the 14th century on the orders of Stefan Milutin, King of Serbia, on the site of a former Byzantine church. The rebuilt church featured frescoes by Byzantine painters, Michael and Eutychios Astrapas. After the Ottomans completed its annexation of the region in the 15th century, a minaret was erected and the complex was converted into a mosque. In 1912, when the Serbian army annexed Kosovo, the status of the church was restored. After World War II, it saw extensive restoration and reconstruction and functioned as a museum. The site was heavily damaged during the 2004 unrest in Kosovo and has been going through several phases of restoration since then.

== Name ==
Bogorodica Ljeviška was the official name in Milutin's era although the church was popularly known as the Church of St. Paraskeva. This is the name by which it is known by both Albanians as Shën Premte and Serbs as Sveta Petka. Consequently, when it became a mosque it was known Cuma Cami (Albanian: Xhuma Xhami, Serbian: Џума-џамија, Džuma-džamija), the Friday Mosque, although it was officially known as Fatih Cami, Mehmed Fatih's mosque.

"Ljeviška" (of Ljeviš) is a Serbianized version of the Greek word "Eleusa" (Ελεούσα), meaning "merciful", a type of depiction of the Virgin Mary in icons in which the infant Jesus Christ is nestled against her cheek.

== History ==
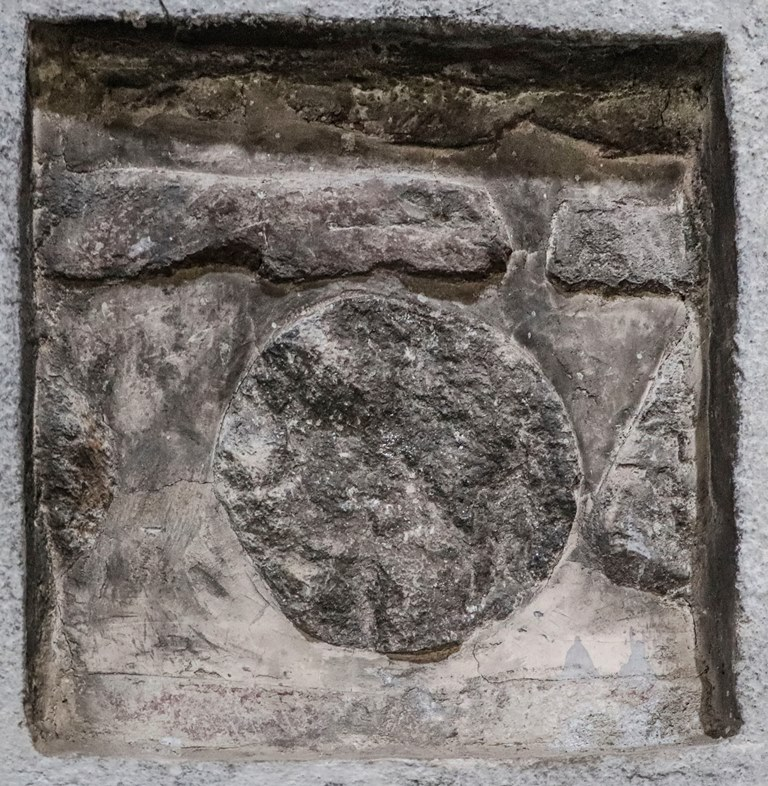
Stone slab depicting a laurel wreath

The site has been used as a religious and burial site since antiquity. Remains of an altar of the Roman era have been found in the outer walls of the later church. A stone slab which depicts a laurel wreath has also been found within the walls of the church. It may have been part of a public building of the same era in the region of Prizren. These findings are common of medieval times, as parts of older buildings were frequently used as building materials (spolia). They highlight valuable information about the city of Prizren in the Roman period and indicate that it may have been a settlement bigger than a village at that time.

Stefan Milutin, King of Serbia, commissioned its rebuilding and expansion in 1306/7 on the site of a Byzantine basilica of the 11th century. The church was built by master builder Nicholas, according to an inscription in the exonarthex. The previous Byzantine church had three naves to which Milutin added two more. The architecture of the rebuilt church utilized Late Byzantine architecture through the use of five domes, monumental inscriptions in its exterior and the Byzantine belfry. Milutin chose to utilize these elements as a symbol in order to highlight his own partially Byzantine origin and relation to the imperial family. Another aspect of the frescoes of Bogorodica is their depiction of Orthodox councils as a symbol that referred to the challenges the Orthodox Church faced against the Catholic Church, a situation common in the borderlands between Catholicism and Orthodoxy in the Balkans.

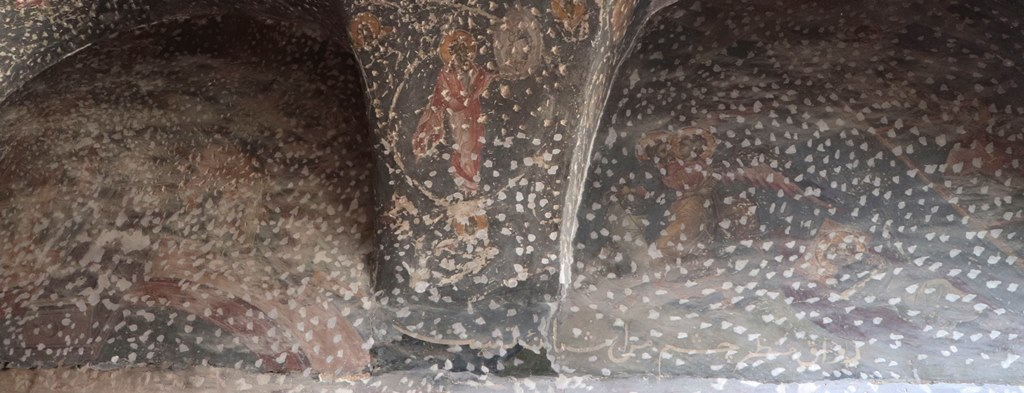
Verse by poet Hafez

The church has an inscription, written in Persian language and incised in Arabic script over the fresco, of a verse composed by the Persian poet Hafez.

In the 15th century, Prizren became part of the expanding Ottoman Empire. In 1455, Sultan Mehmed the Conqueror (Fatih Mehmet) visited Prizren, which at the time had eight Orthodox and two Catholic churches. Sultan Mehmed chose Bogorodica to become a mosque. An inscription in the church describes the event of the conversion. The conversion into a mosque saw the erection of a minaret, which was removed in 1923 after Serbia had annexed Kosovo. In this period, it was formally called Fatih camisi, while popularly it was known as Cuma Cami, which is how the site is known to the local inhabitants. The archival records of the mosque are a valuable source for the history of Ottoman Prizren. In the Great Turkish War, the Austrian army held Prizren briefly. As a plague erupted, imperial general Silvio Piccolomini visited Prizren to meet Catholic Archbishop Pjetër Bogdani. There, a few days later he died as he had contracted the plague and was buried in the graveyard of the church.

In 1948, it was recognized by the Yugoslav government as a protected cultural site and in 1950–52 a large-scale reconstruction and restoration project began. When it was completed, the site was turned into a museum. Further restoration work was done in the 1970s and 1980s. In 1990, Serbia designated it a Monument of Culture of Exceptional Importance. After the Kosovo War, the complex was guarded by KFOR. It was heavily damaged during the 2004 unrest in Kosovo when it was burnt along with other Serbian Orthodox sites. On 13 July 2006, it was placed on UNESCO's World Heritage List as an extension of the Visoki Dečani site (named Medieval Monuments in Kosovo), which, as a whole, was placed on the List of World Heritage in Danger. In 2005–2008, it was restored by the Commission for Implementation of Reconstruction for Serbian Orthodox Church monuments in Kosovo of the European Union. The site is part of the protected cultural heritage of the Kosovo under its Ministry of Culture. In 2020, conservation and restoration of the exterior and churchyard was carried out, under finance of the Serbian Ministry of Culture and Information.

== Gallery ==
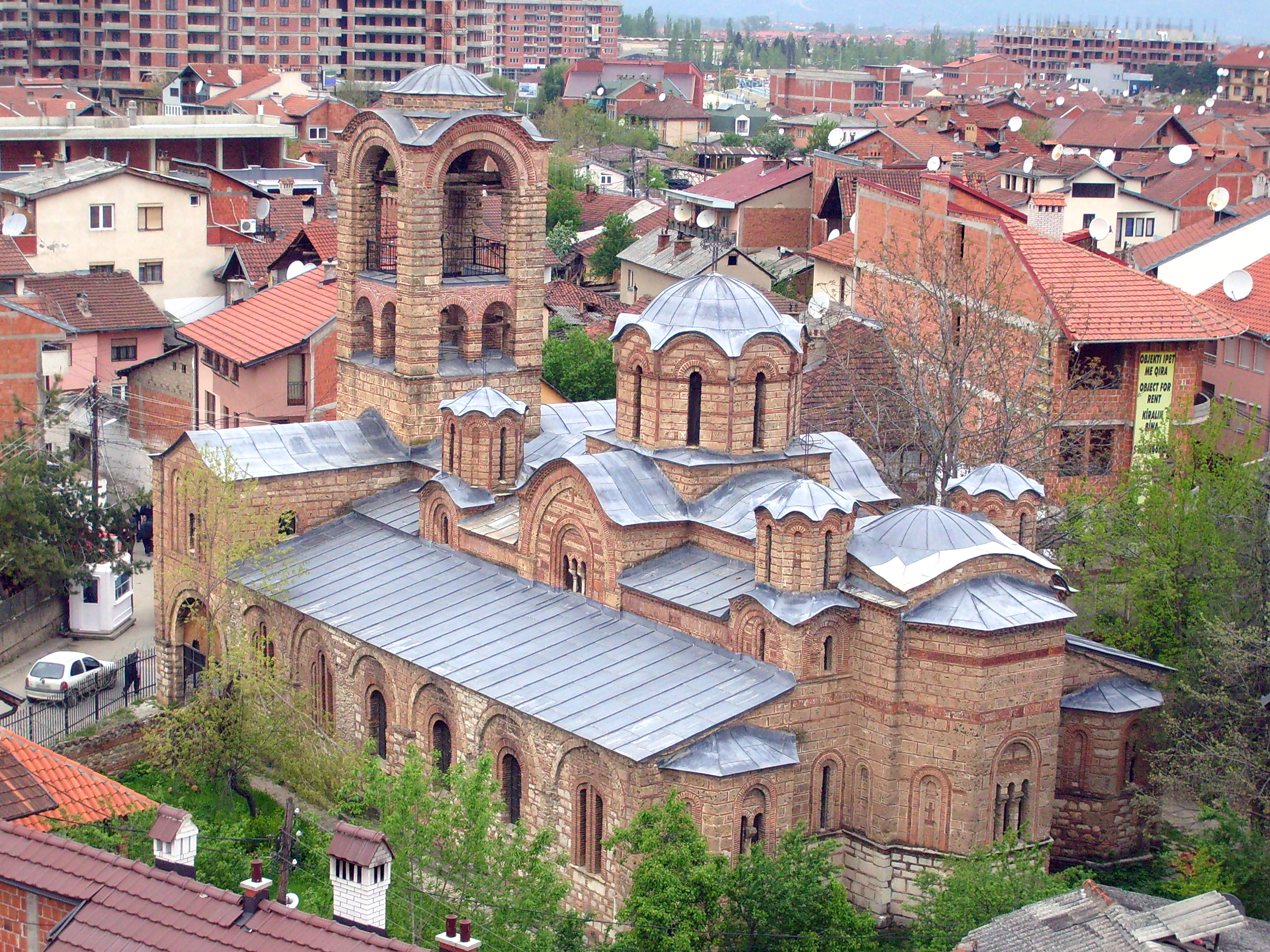
View of the church

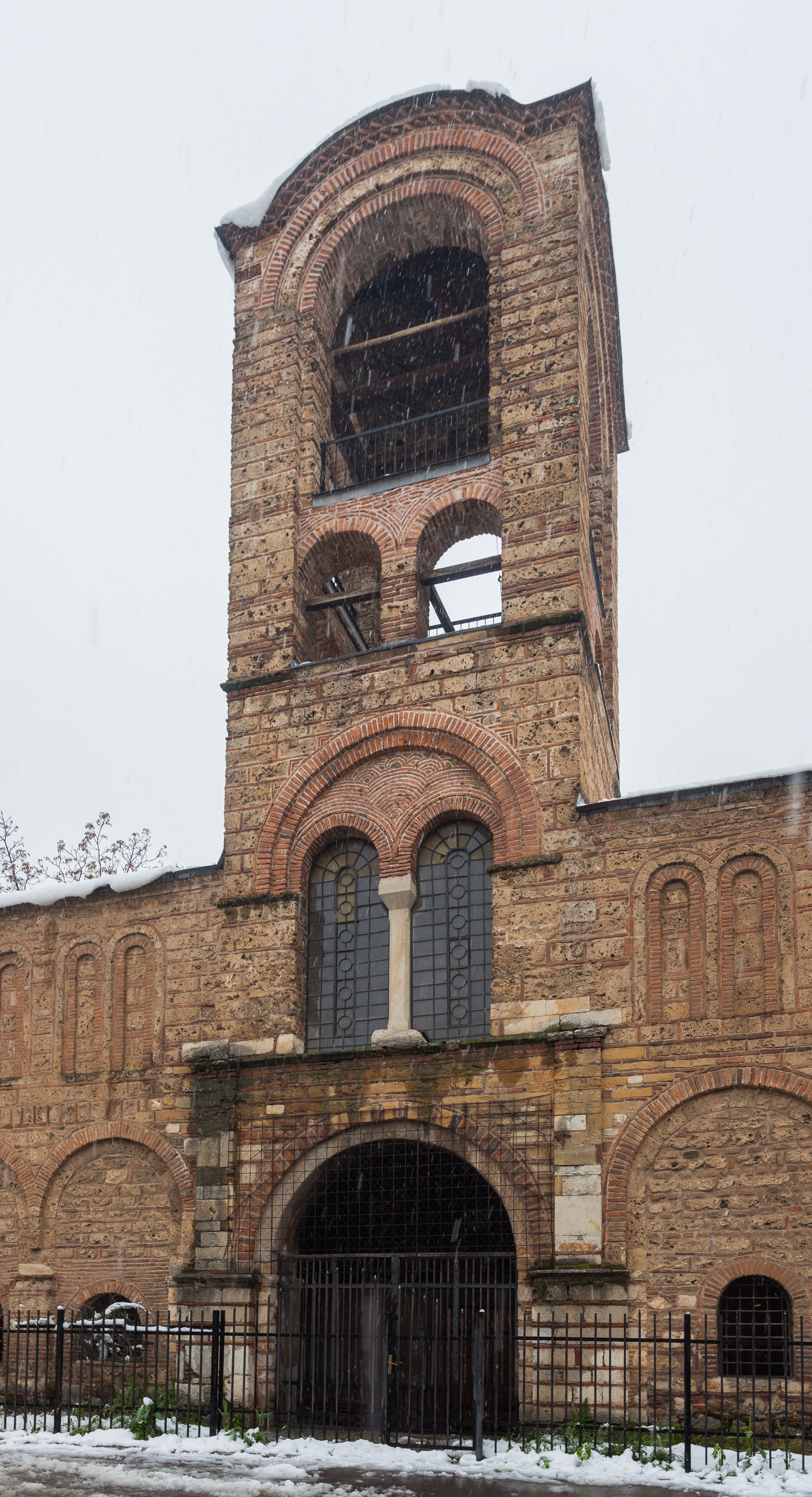
Bell tower

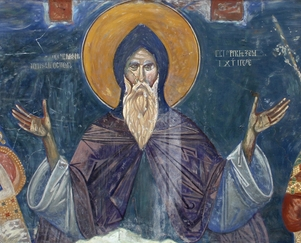
Fresco of Stefan Nemanja

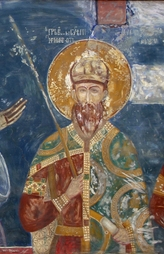
Fresco of Stefan the First-Crowned, beginning of the 14th century (1307–1309)

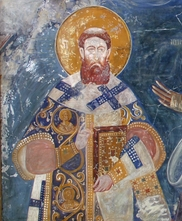
Fresco of Saint Sava, beginning of the 14th century (1307–1309)

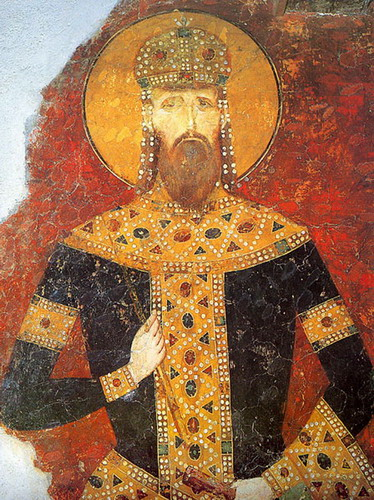
Fresco of King Stefan Milutin

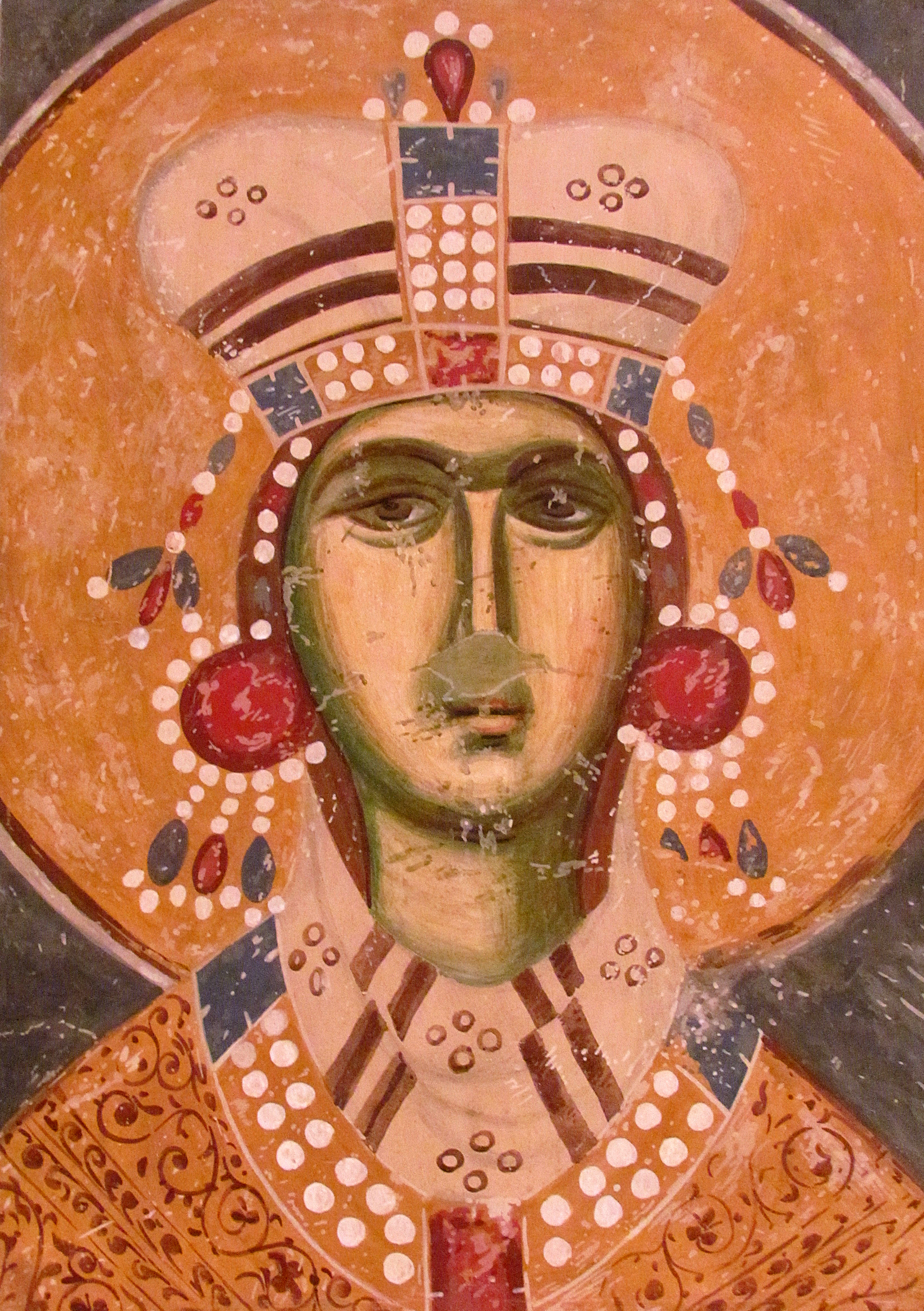
Fresco of Saint Barbara

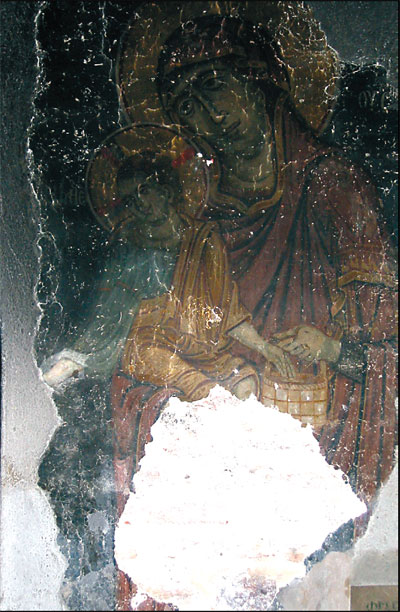
Fresco Bathing of the Christ, destroyed during the 2004 unrest in Kosovo

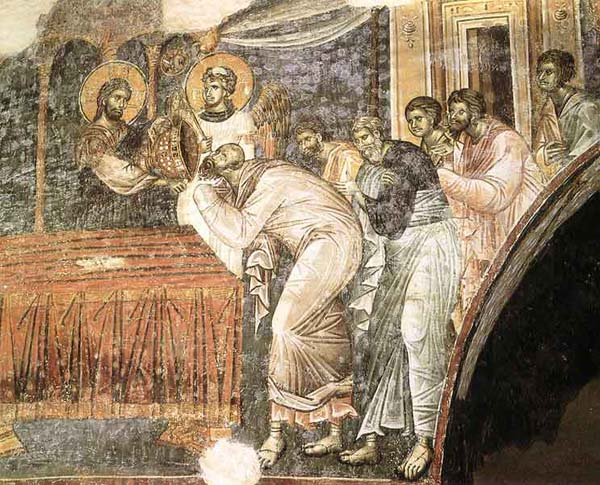
Fresco Communion of Apostles

== See also ==
- Eparchy of Raška and Prizren
- Destruction of Serbian heritage in Kosovo

== Sources ==
=== Bibliography ===
- Boeck, Elena (2015). Imagining the Byzantine Past: The Perception of History in the Illustrated Manuscripts of Skylitzes and Manasses. Cambridge University Press. ISBN 978-1107085817.
- Ferrari, Silvio; Benzo, Andrea (2014). Between Cultural Diversity and Common Heritage: Legal and Religious Perspectives on the Sacred Places of the Mediterranean. London & New York: Routledge. ISBN 9781317175032.
- Todić, Branislav (1999). Serbian Medieval Painting: The Age of King Milutin. Belgrade: Draganić. ISBN 9788644102717.
- Brugmann, Birte (2006). "An archeological map of the historic zone of Prizren" (PDF). CHWB. Archived from the original (PDF) on 2020-06-25.
- Kaleshi, Hasan (1987). "The Oldest Vakuf Charter in Yugoslavia". Revue de philologie orientale. 36.
- Ćurčić, Slobodan (2004). Byzantium: Faith and Power (1261-1557). Metropolitan Museum of Art of New York. ISBN 1588391132.
- Ćurčić, Slobodan (2005). Judson J. Emerick (ed.). "Renewed from the Very Foundations": The Question of the Genesis of the Bogorodica Ljeviska in Prizren. Archaeology in architecture: studies in honor of Cecil L. Striker. von Zabern. ISBN 9783805334921.
- Nenadović, Slobodan (1963). Bogorodica Ljevis̆ka: njen postanak i njeno mesto u arhitekturi Milutinovog vremena. Narodna knjiga.
- İğciler, Ahmet (2004). Prizren'de yok olan Osmanlı izleri. Kosova Türk Araştırmacılar Derneği.
