= Hamam of Peja =

Cultural heritage monument in Peja, Kosovo

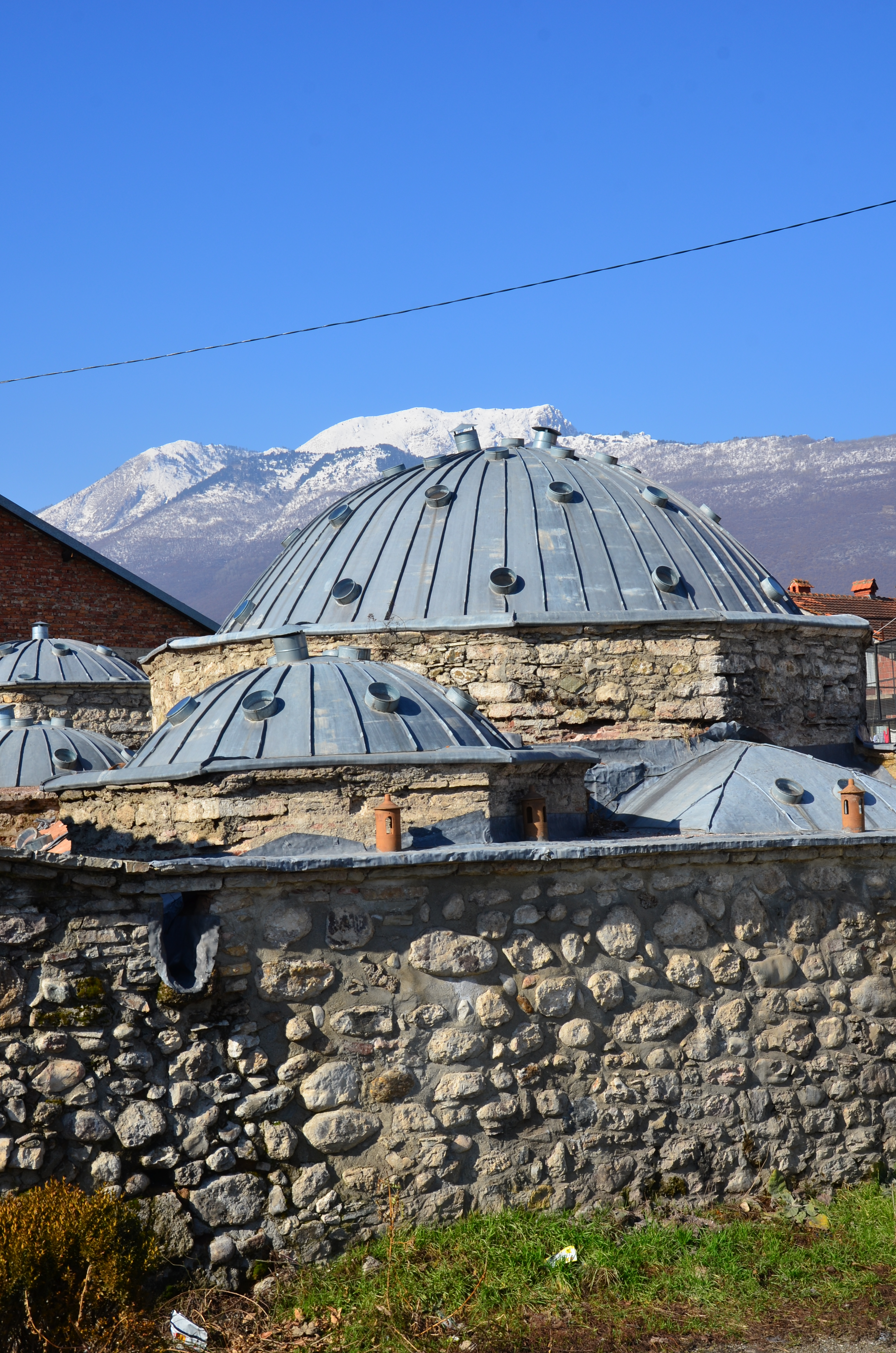
- Location: Peja, Kosovo
- Built: 15th century

The Hamam of Peja (Albanian: Hamami i Pejës) or Old Bath is an Ottoman bath in Peja, Kosovo, built in the second half of the 15th century. The building consists of an asymmetric "double" bath. According to some sources the bath was reconstructed in 1861 for unknown reasons. The bath was damaged during war and was reconstructed after. Today, the hammam serves as an exhibition hall for different art shows and more.

== See also ==
- Bajrakli Mosque
