= School for the visually impaired in Peja =

Special education school in Peja

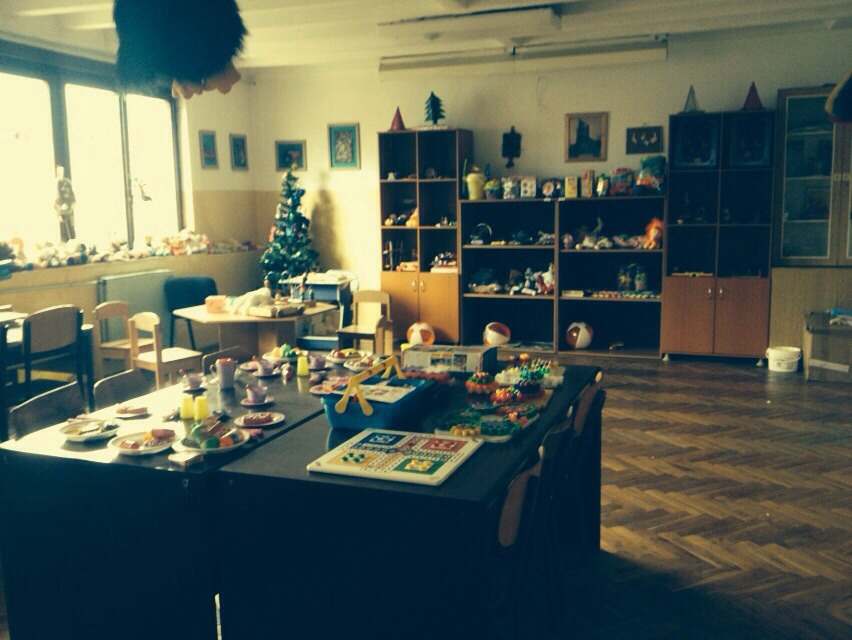
The Special School for the Blind and Visually Impaired

The Special School for the Blind and Visually Impaired (Albanian: Shkolla speciale për të verbër) is located in Peja.

== Details ==
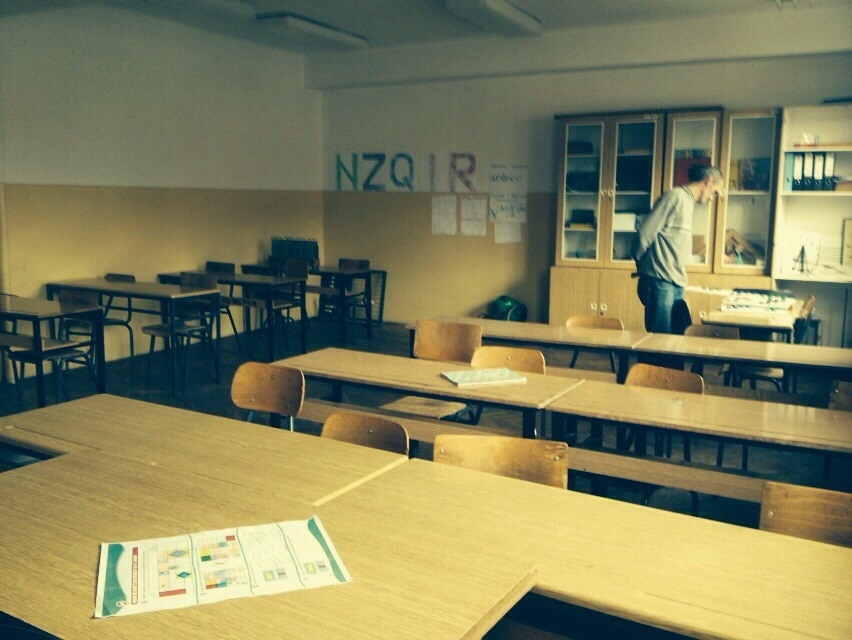
The Special School for the Blind and Visually Impaired

The Special School for the Blind and Visually Impaired dates back to 1982. The school offers grades from the preschool to high school levels. The Well-being Center for the blind in Peja offers services for regular schools that have integrated students in special education. The institution is the only school in Kosovo which offers education for students with special needs.

The services offered are:

- Enlarged books,
- Trainings for teachers and parents,
- Moveable tables,
- Magnifying glasses
- Audiobook CD and cassettes.

This school is also equipped with cabinets of different types:

- Biology,
- Chemistry,
- History,
- Arts,
- Geography,
- IT cabinet
- Braille printing house.

== Teaching process ==
The school covers about 3,000 m^{2}, and contains the dormitory that houses 37 students of other municipalities, including students belonging to minorities. The school has a total of 50 students starting from preschool, through the elementary, and high school levels. The high school level students attend two professional course directions related to administration and information technology.

== Braille printing house ==
The department for printing books in Braille is a printing house which covers the needs of visually impaired students for textbooks. It has a capacity of 600 pages per hour. This division was used for printing more than 50 schoolbooks and novels for students of this institution. It has also printed the Constitution of Kosovo, the law on lower and middle level education, and other materials.
