= Bajrakli Mosque, Peja =

Mosque in Peja, Kosovo

Coordinates: 42.6531°N 20.2938°E

Bajrakli Mosque
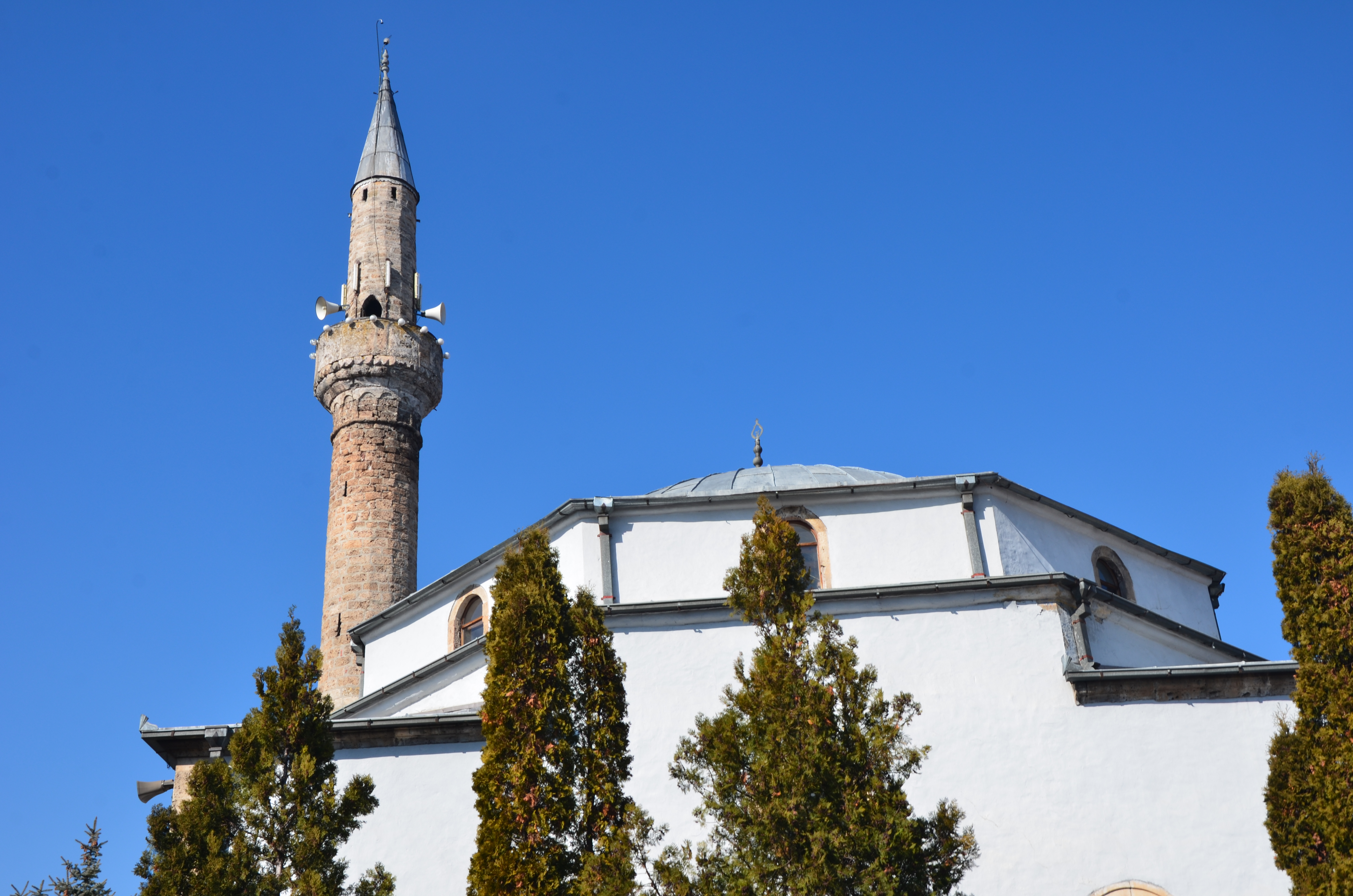

Religion
- Affiliation: Islam

Location
- Location: Peja
- Country: Kosovo
- Interactive map of Bajrakli Mosque

Architecture
- Type: mosque
- Style: Ottoman
- Completed: 1471; 555 years ago
- Minaret: 1

Cultural Heritage under Permanent Protection
- Official name: Xhamia e Bajraklive
- Type: Architectural Heritage: Monument/Ensemble
- Reference no.: 354

The Bajrakli Mosque (Albanian: Bajrakli Xhamia, Bosnian: Bajrakli džamija, Serbian: Бајракли џамија), also known as the Bazaar Mosque (Albanian: Çarshi Xhamia, Bosnian: Pazar džamija), is the main mosque situated in the centre of the Bazaar of Peja, Kosovo. It was built in 1471 by Sultan Mehmed II and is an Ottoman-style single-domed mosque with the oldest and highest dome in the city. The mosque was burned twice once during World War II in 1943 by Italian forces when the Bazaar of Peja was completely burned down, and the second time by the Serbian military during the 1999 Kosovo War.

== Architecture and design ==
The Bajrak Mosque (also known as Çarshi Mosque of Peja) exemplifies classical Ottoman imperial architecture in Kosovo. Built between 1462 and 1472 by Sultan Mehmed II, it stands as the largest mosque in Peja and follows the typical compositional plan of imperial Ottoman mosques with three primary elements: a central prayer hall covered by a dome, an open portico, and a minaret positioned on the right side.

Unlike the other imperial mosques in Kosovo, the Bajrak Mosque's dome rests on squinches rather than pendentives. The mosque was constructed using a combination of brick and stone, although the exterior façade is currently covered with plaster. The interior is illuminated through three rows of windows: quadratic windows in the first row and arched windows in the second and third rows, with an additional oculus positioned at the top of the mihrab wall.

The portico features an open design covered by three smaller domes. The minaret follows the polygonal style typical of Ottoman mosque architecture, containing the standard elements found in other imperial mosques of the period: footing, pulpit, transition segment, shaft, balcony, upper shaft, and spire.

== Interior features ==
The Bajrak Mosque is distinguished by its exceptionally rich and colourful interior decoration, making it considerably more ornate than other contemporary mosques in Kosovo. The prayer hall features an extensive program of painted decoration including arabesques, geometric patterns, medallions, and floral, architectural, and naturalistic motifs.

The mihrab (prayer niche) is particularly noteworthy, featuring an elaborate painting depicting paradise, decorative muqarnas, and two rosettes executed in low relief. The stone minbar (pulpit) and a gallery supported by ten stone pillars also display intricate decorative elements combining painted surfaces and carved relief.

The colour palette employed throughout the interior includes various shades of blue, green, yellow, and red applied against a white background. The decorative program extends beyond painting to include carved stone elements, with stars, rosettes, and geometric patterns adorning the mihrab, minbar, squinches, and the pedestals and capitals of the columns in both the portico and gallery.

== Historical significance ==
The Bajrak Mosque is the third imperial mosque commissioned by Mehmed II in Kosovo, following the Çarshi Mosque and Fatih Mosque in Pristina. As part of the early wave of Ottoman religious architecture in the region, it helped establish Islamic architectural traditions in Kosovo while incorporating local building practices.

Like other imperial mosques, the Bajrak Mosque served as an important centre for urban development in Peja during the Ottoman period, functioning as a focal point around which markets and other civic structures were organized. Its construction and endowment by Sultan Mehmed II represents an example of the strategic importance the Ottoman Empire placed on establishing cultural and religious institutions in newly conquered territories.

== Structural characteristics and preservation ==
The Bajrakli Mosque building features a rectangular plan measuring 18.87 m in length and 13.95 m in width, with a total area of 263.24 m^{2}. The mosque consists of three main architectural elements: a central prayer hall covered by a large dome, an entrance hall covered by three smaller domes, and a minaret reaching approximately 28 mm in height. The prayer hall occupies most of the mosque's area (194.47 mm^{2}), while the entrance hall comprises the remaining 68.77 mm^{2}. The main dome stands on squinches rather than pendentives (a distinction from other imperial mosques in Kosovo), and the mosque is illuminated through three rows of windows: quadratic windows in the first row, arched windows in the second row and drum, and an oculus at the top of the mihrab wall. The structure is built primarily of brick and stone, with the façade currently covered in plaster.

The mosque has faced various structural challenges throughout its history, including damage during the 1998–1999 Kosovo War when it was burned by Serbian forces, necessitating subsequent restoration. Modern structural analysis has identified several vulnerabilities in the building, including stress concentrations in the small domes of the entrance hall, pendentives, arches, and around openings in the main dome. Under simulated earthquake conditions, the maximum displacement was found to be 7.1–8.0 mm, with areas exceeding allowable tensile and compressive stresses, particularly in the roof system. Visual inspections have revealed cracks in the domes, pendentives, arches, and load-bearing walls, often near openings, which correlate with the highest stress concentration areas identified through finite element analysis. As one of Kosovo's most significant Ottoman architectural monuments, the Bajrakli Mosque represents both historical and cultural heritage that requires ongoing conservation efforts to ensure its preservation.

== See also ==
- Islam in Kosovo
- Religion in Kosovo
