= Peja =

Fifth largest city of Kosovo

Peja: Peja or Pejë (Albanian) Peć or Пећ (Serbian)
- City and municipality
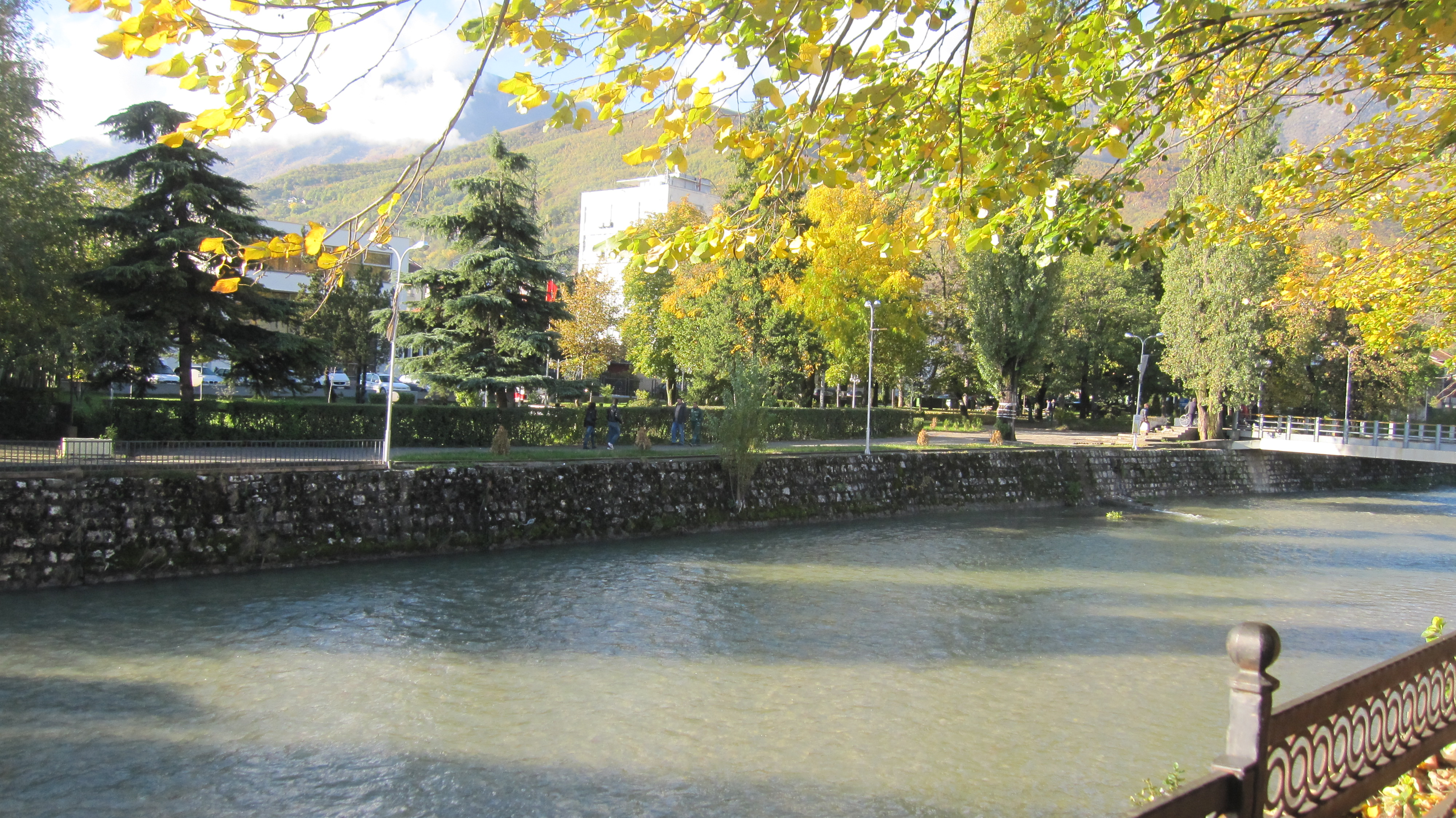
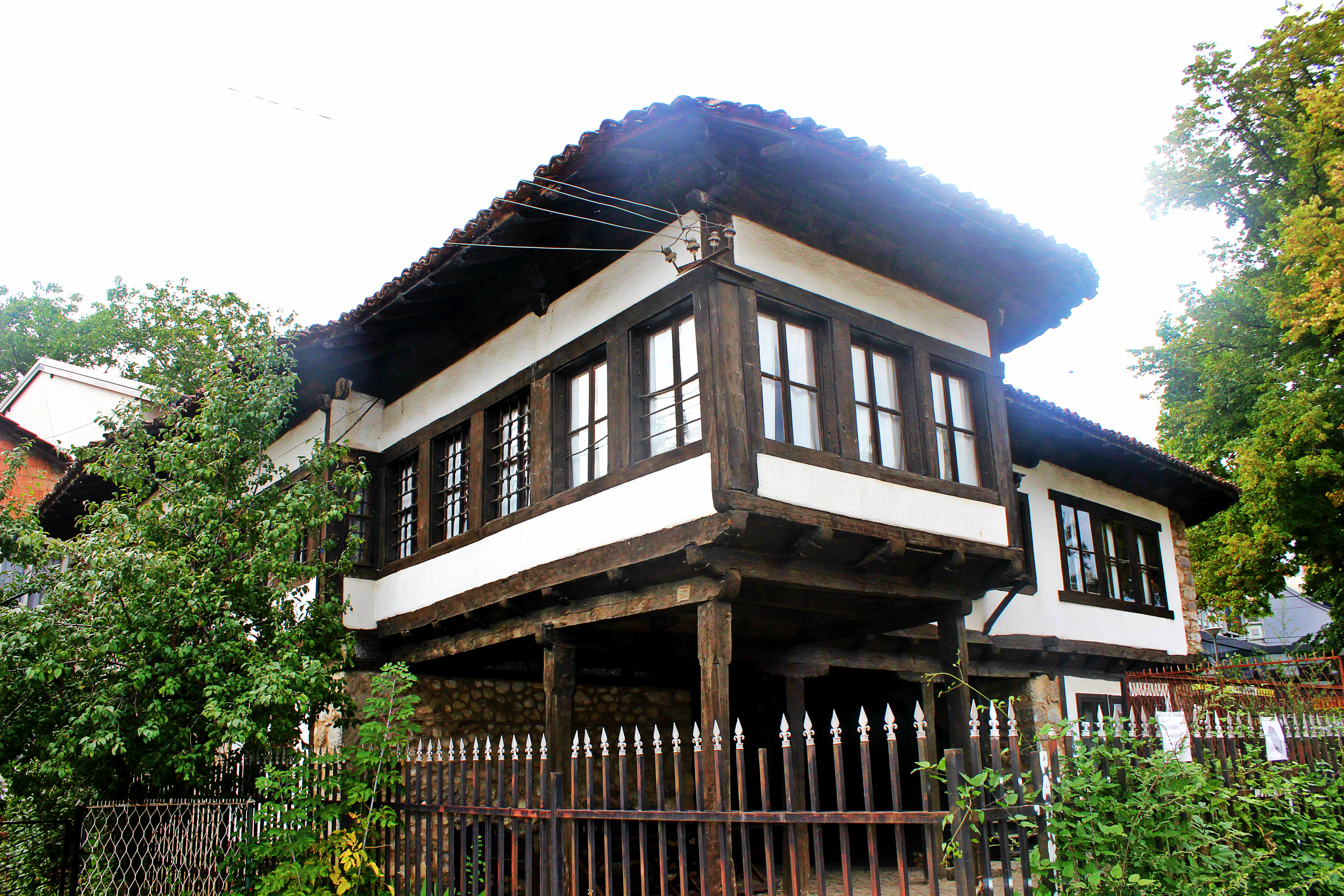
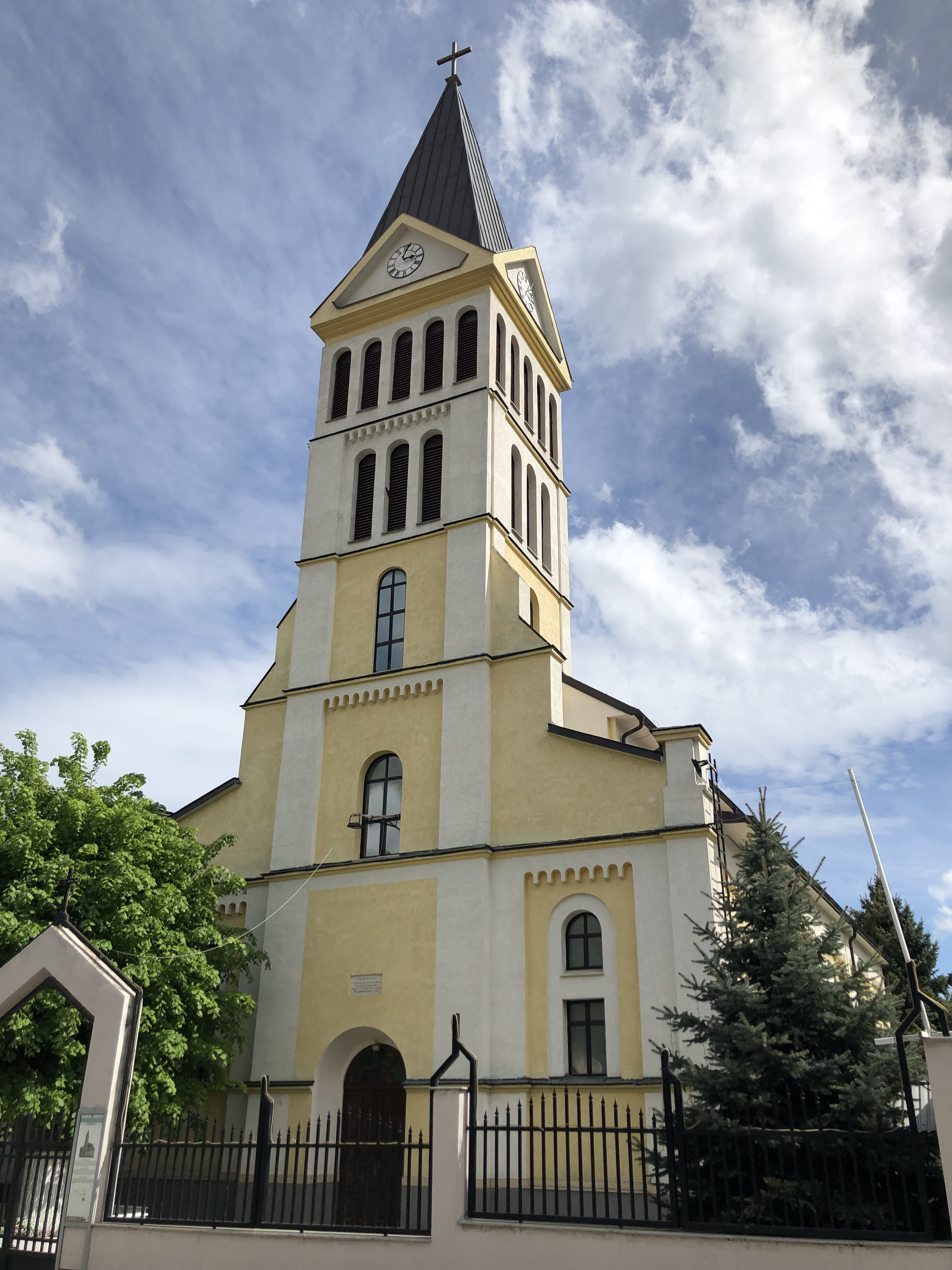
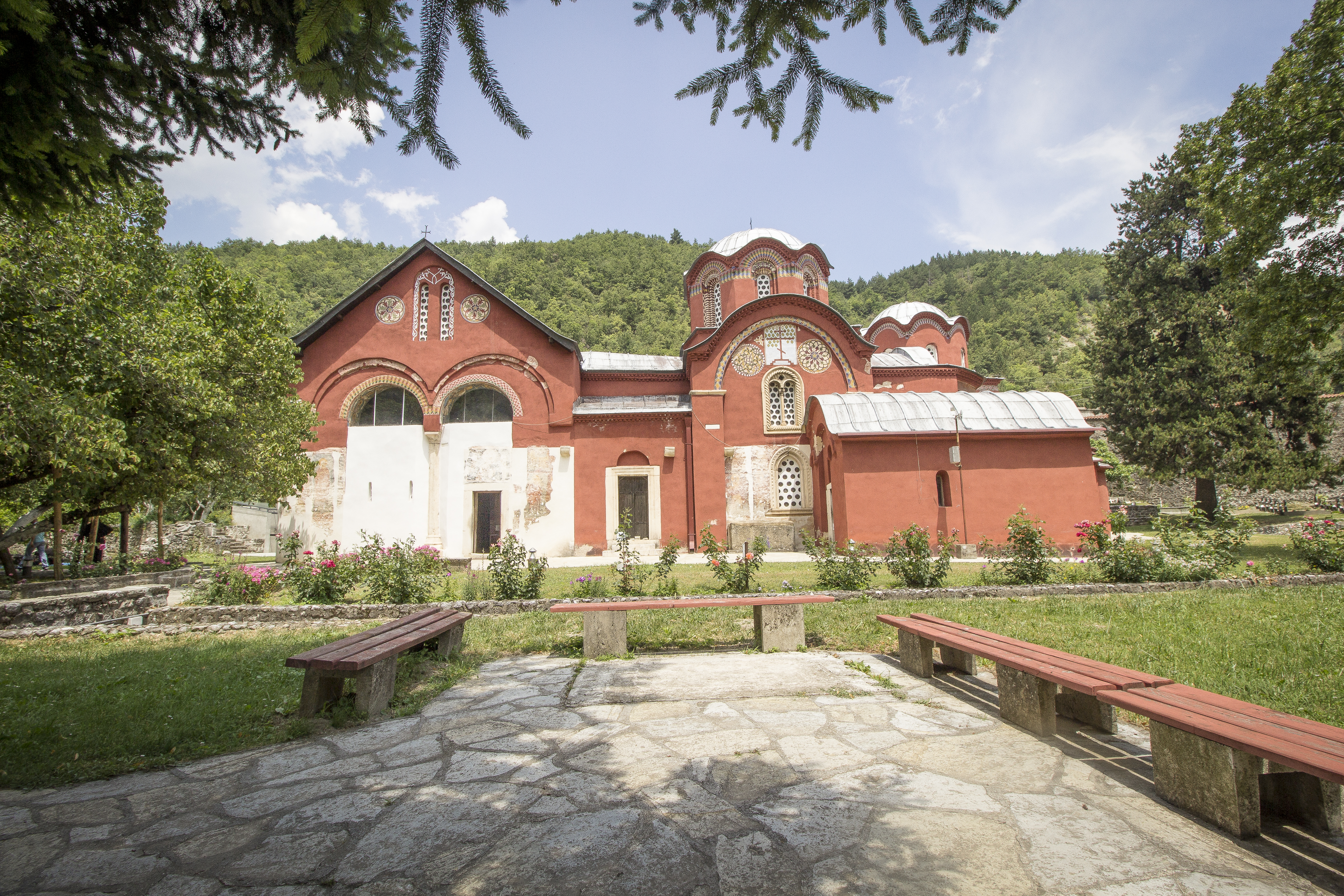
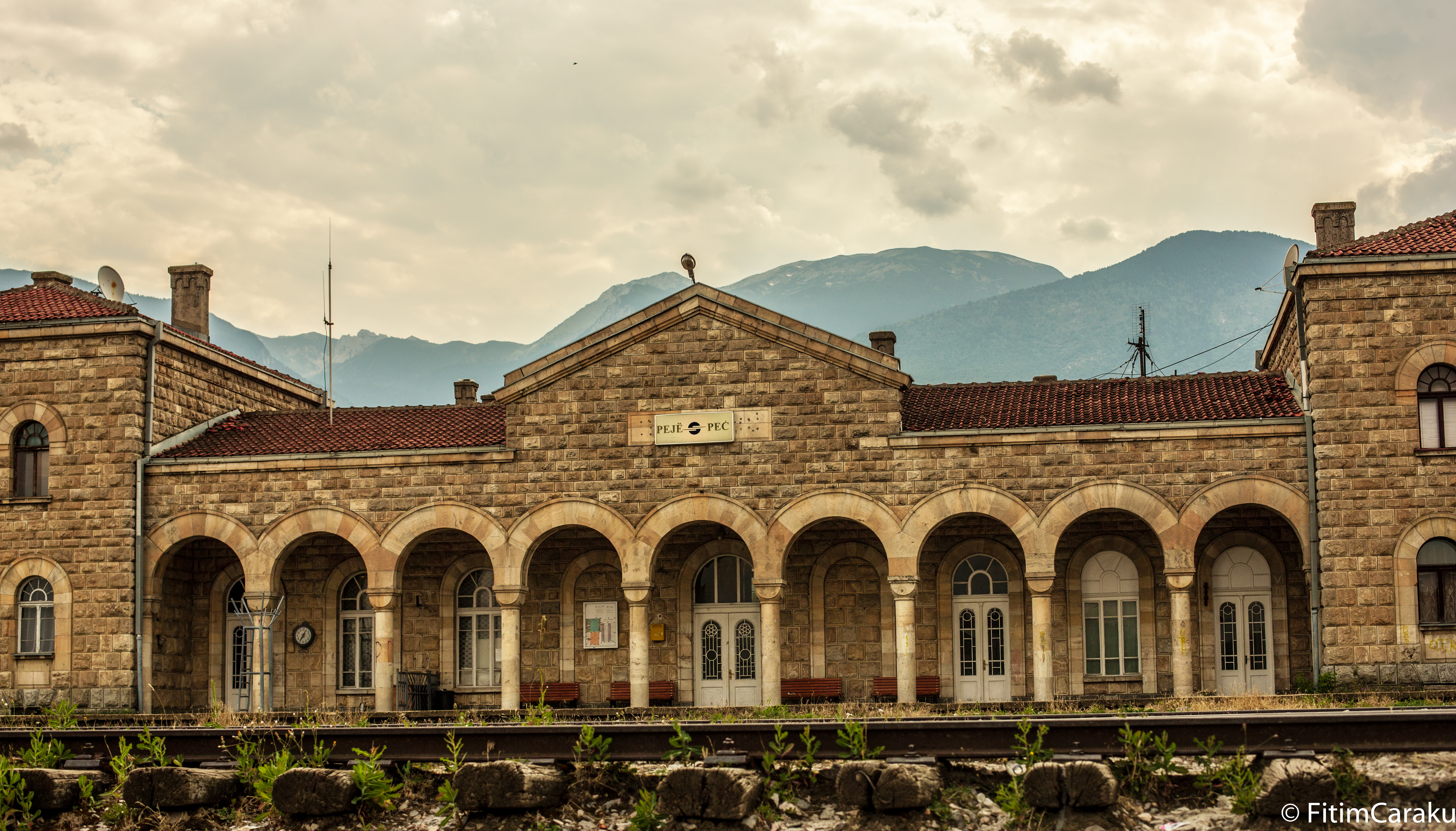
- Main Square Lumbardhi River Ethnographic Museum St. Catherine Church Bajrakli Mosque Clock Tower Patriarchate of Peć Peja Train Station

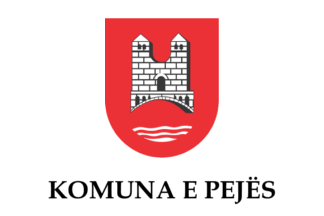
- Flag Seal
- Interactive map of Peja
- Location within Kosovo
- Coordinates: 42°39′37″N 20°17′30″E
- Country: Kosovo
- District: Peja
- Municipality: Peja

Government
  - Type: Mayor–council
  - Mayor: Gazmend Muhaxheri (LDK)
  - Council: Peja Municipal Council

Area
  - Municipality: 602.63 km^{2} (232.68 sq mi)
  - Rank: 3rd in Kosovo
- Elevation: 516 m (1,693 ft)

Population (2024)
  - Municipality: 82,661
  - Rank: 5th in Kosovo
  - Density: 137.17/km^{2} (355.26/sq mi)
  - Urban: 41,171
  - Ethnicity: 91.22% Albanians; 8.78% Other
- Demonym(s): Albanian: Pejan (m), Pejane (f)
- Time zone: UTC+1 (CET)
  - Summer (DST): UTC+2 (CEST)
- Postal code: 30000
- Area code: +383 (0) 39
- Vehicle registration: 03
- Website: kk.rks-gov.net/peje/

Peja (Albanian indefinite form: Pejë, pronounced [ˈpɛj]) or Peć (Serbian Cyrillic: Пећ, pronounced [pêːtɕ]), is the fifth most populous city in Kosovo and serves as the seat of the Peja Municipality and the District of Peja. It is located in the Rugova region on the eastern section of the Accursed Mountains along the Peja's Lumbardh in the western part of Kosovo.

In medieval times, the city was under Byzantine, Bulgarian and Serbian rule. After its integration into Serbian territory, it became the seat of the Serbian Orthodox Church in 1346. The Patriarchal monastery of Peć is a UNESCO World Heritage Site as part of the Medieval Monuments in Kosovo. Under Ottoman rule the city became a district capital with mosques and civil architecture. From the end of the nineteenth century until today, the city has been the site of nationalist aspirations and claims for both ethnic Albanians and Serbs, often resulting in tense inter-ethnic relations and conflict.

According to the 2024 census, the municipality of Peja has 82,745 inhabitants. The municipality covers an area of 602 km^{2} (232 sq mi), including the city of Peja and 95 villages; it is divided into 28 territorial communities.

== Etymology ==
The Albanian name's definite form is Peja and the indefinite Pejë. The Serbian name for the city is Peć. The etymology of the city's name in Serbian is derived from the South Slavic word for cave, Pećina. The connection is in reference to nearby caves to the city.

During the period of Ottoman rule, it was known as Ottoman Turkish İpek (ايپك). Other names of the city include Latin Pescium and Greek Episkion (Επισκιον) meaning "Episcopal City". It was also known as Siparant.

== History ==
=== Ancient History ===
The city is located in a strategic position on Peja's Lumbardh, a tributary of the White Drin to the east of the Accursed Mountains. The medieval city was possibly built on the ruins of Siparant(um), a Roman municipium (town or city). The area has the most unearthed stelae in all of Kosovo.

Archeological studies have concluded that settlements in the Peja region have existed since the Paleolithic and Mezolithic periods. Several ancient ruins in Peja and in its surrounding villages have been declared as UNESCO heritage monuments, including the ancient fortifications of Gradina and Gjyteti, as well as the archeological sites of Doberdol, Kryshec, Vranoc, Tuma and Peja (archeological site located inside the city), together with the Roman archeological site of Stanica in Gllogjan.

Several caves in the area, such as the Bukuroshja e Fjetur Cave in Radac, where the remains of a 6,000 year old skeleton were found, the Dema cave, the Karamakazi cave and the Shpella e Mbretëreshes (Queens cave) were inhabited by ancient humans in the early Stone Age according to archeological findings.

According to historiographer Reshat Nurboja, the earliest known name for Peja is "Peion", a Dardanian city built around 231 BC. He states that it was made by the Dardanians as a city to house groups of Pannonians who migrated to the region during the multiple Dardanian-Macedonian conflicts. The name "Peion" could derive from the then Pannonian king Drypeion. Nurboja also places the age of Peja at around 2,300 years old. The city of "Peiscium" mentioned by the Romans in the 4rth-3rd century BC is also thought to have been in the area of the Peja.

=== Medieval development ===
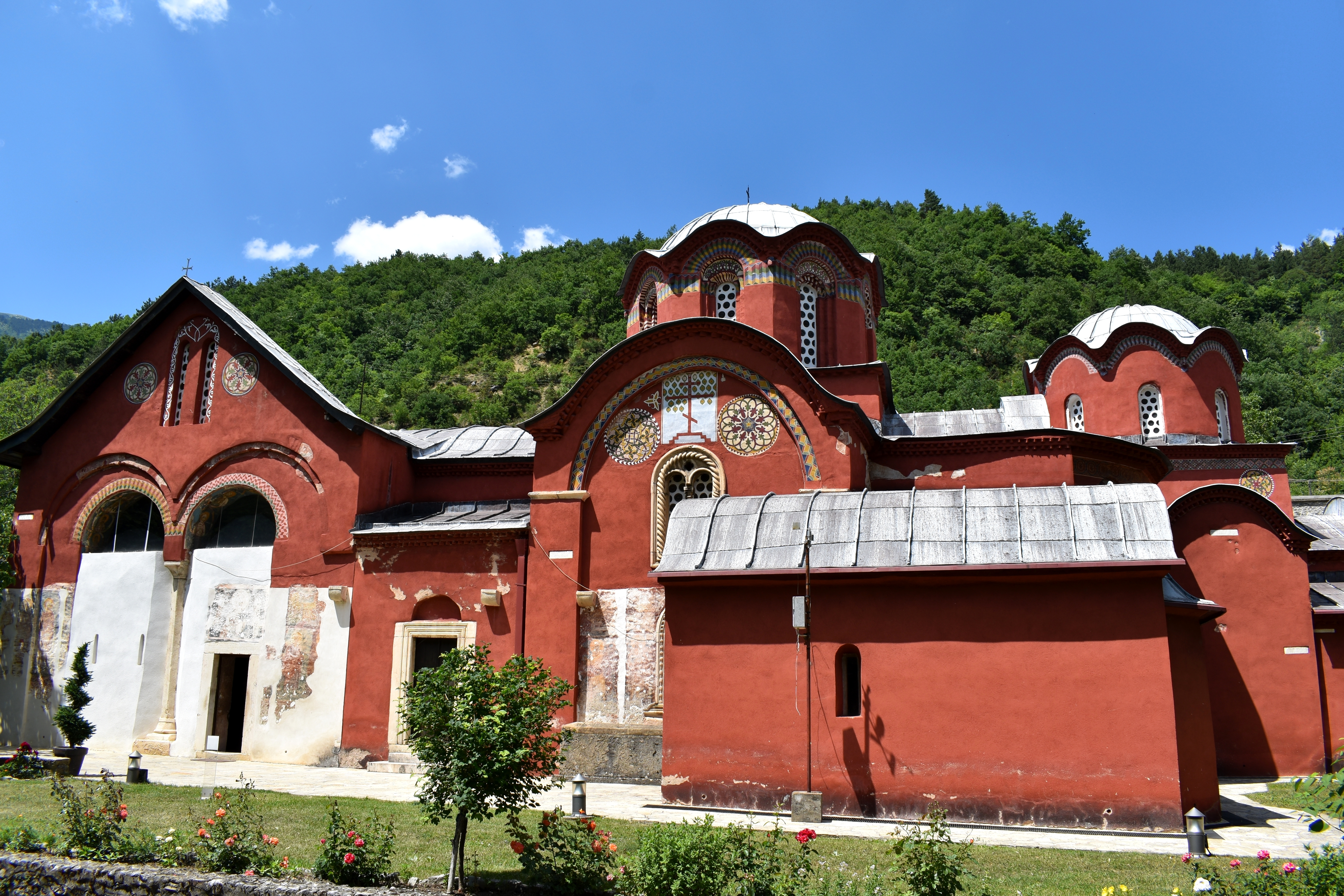
The Patriarchal Monastery of Peć was the seat of the Serbian Orthodox Church from the 14th century, when its status was upgraded into a patriarchate.

Following Slavic settlements in the 6th century, the Byzantine Empire and the First Bulgarian Empire fought for control of the area until it finally fell under full Serbian rule. Between 1180 and 1190, Serbian Grand Prince Stefan Nemanja annexed Peja with its surrounding župa (district) of Hvosno from the Byzantine Empire, thus establishing Serbian rule over the city of Peja for next 300 years. The newly-founded monastery of Žiča was the seat of a Serbian archbishop, and Peja came under direct rule of Serbian archbishops and later patriarchs who built their residences and numerous churches in the city, starting with the church of Holy Apostles built by archbishop Saint Arsenije I Sremac. After the Žiča monastery was burned by the Cumans in the 1290s, the seat of Serbian archbishop was transferred to a more secure location, the Patriarchal Monastery of Peć. The city became a major religious center of medieval Serbia under the Serbian Emperor Stefan Dušan, who made it the seat of the Serbian Orthodox Church in 1346. It remained the seat of the Serbian Orthodox Church until the abolition of the Serbian Patriarchate of Peć in 1766. Peja was also shortly a part of the Principality of Dukagjini in the late 14th century or early 15th and was its northernmost territory.

=== Ottoman Empire ===
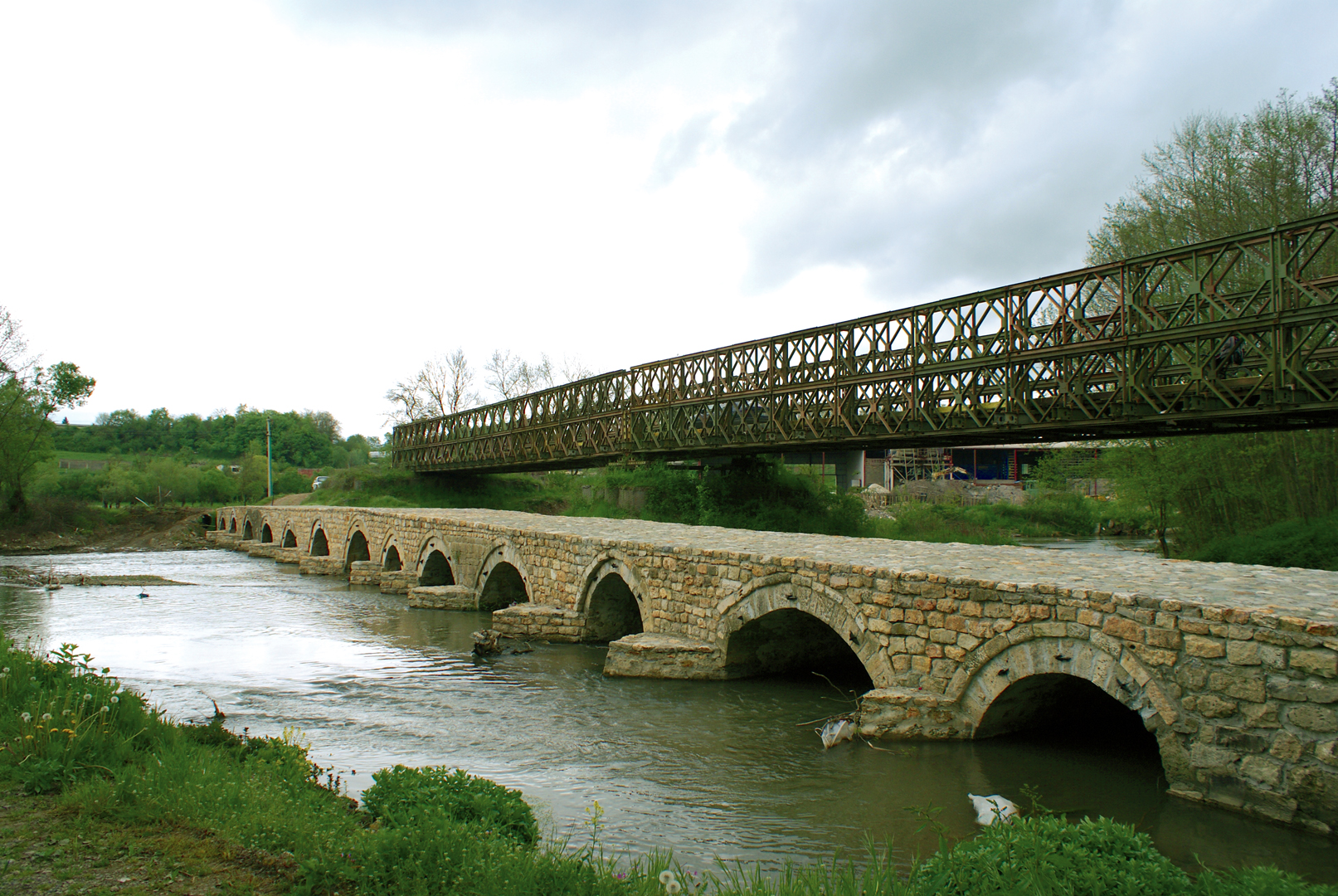
Zallç Bridge from the Ottoman era

The town passed under Ottoman rule after its capture in 1455. In Turkish, the town was known as İpek. The town became the center of the Sanjak of İpek, governed by the Albanian Mahmud Pasha Dukagjini as its first sanjakbey (local ruler). The Sanjak of Dukagjin had four kazas: Peja, Gjakova, Gusinje and Berane.

During the 15th and 16th centuries, Orthodox Albanians formed the majority of the region's population whereas South Slavs formed a minority. The Slavs had arrived during the period of Serbian rule in Kosovo through the Middle Ages from the regions north of Kosovo or as a stratum of the ruling class. In the Ottoman defters of the time, there existed a designation for new arrivals to the region; in the region of Peja and Suhogërla, new arrivals existed within about a third of the villages, with their anthroponomy indicating that only 4 of these new 180 arrivals had Albanian names, whereas the rest had characteristically Slavic names. This suggests that an arrival of a Slavic element to the northeast of the Sanjak of Shkodra occurred during the 15th-16th centuries, and the absence of this trend in the rest of the Sanjak of Shkodra indicates that these Slav populations hailed from Slavic-inhabited regions outside of Peja itself.

In 1582, Ottoman cadastral records indicated that 23 villages in the nahiya of İpek were inhabited by an Albanian majority due to the dominance of Albanian anthroponomy amongst its inhabitants; 85 villages had mixed Albanian-Slavic anthroponomy, and the rest contained almost exclusively Slavic anthroponomy.

The villages with a certain Albanian majority were Osak (Usak), Kramor, Ljepovaç, Trakagjin, Strelec, Romaniça, Sredna Çirna Goi, Nivokas, Temshenica, Trepova pole, Novasel, Dobri Lipari, Boshanica, Brestovac, Baç (Beç), Tokina pole, Novasel (another Novasel), Dujak, Dobroshi i Madh, Vraniq, Mraç or Çirna Potok, Dolina Çirna Goi and Preloniça. The documentation of Albanians in Peja at the end of the 15th centuries, which coincides with the very beginning of Ottoman rule in Kosovo, presupposes that the Albanians of Peja were early inhabitants of the region.

By the 1582 defter, the city had been significantly Islamised. Several cases exist where Muslim inhabitants have a blend of Islamic and Albanian anthroponomy (such as the widespread Deda family: Rizvan Deda, Haxhi Deda, Ali Deda). The Muslim neighbourhoods include Xhamia Sherif, Sinan Vojvoda, Piri bej, Ahmed Bej, Hysein, Hasan Çelebi, Mustafa bej, Mahmud Kadi, Orman, Kapishniça, Mesxhidi Haxhi Mahmud, Bali bej and Çeribash. The Christian neighbourhoods include Gjura Papuxhi, Nikolla (abandoned), Nikolla Vukman (abandoned), Andrija (abandoned) and Olivir. The inhabitants of the two Christian neighbourhoods Olivir and Gjura Papuxhi had a blend of characteristically Albanian and Slavic/Orthodox anthroponomy.

A revolt against the Ottomans was instigated in the area of Peja in 1560 by an Albanian named Pjeter Bogdani, possibly an ancestor of the Archbishop Pjeter Bogdani himself. Not much is known about the revolt other than that Bogdani robbed a caravan, killed some traders and was later captured and executed.

During this period the town of Peja had a majority Muslim population; the Ottoman tax register from 1582 lists 158 households with only 15 being Christian. Travelling Kosovo in the 1660s, Evliya Celebi wrote that the town and the mountains lay in Albania. According to a report from 1681 by Pjeter Bogdani, the town had a majority of 1,000 Muslim Albanian households, and 100 Christian Serb households.

In 1688, the city became the seat of the Pashalik of Peja under the governance of Mahmut Pasha of Begolli. The Pashalik included most of the Dukagjin region. The Begolli continued to govern the region until the Pashalik was disbanded between 1821–1831.

Joseph Muller noted the town in the 1830s had a majority Muslim population of 2000 households and only 130 Orthodox households.

In 1835 the Albanian population supported by other Albanian rebels from Shkodra took over the town from the Ottomans.

The Albanian nationalist organization League of Peja established in 1899 was based in the city. The organization, led by Haxhi Zeka, adopted the character of the earlier League of Prizren to defend the rights of Ottoman Albanians and seek autonomous status within the empire. After an armed clash with Ottoman forces in 1900 the organization ended its operations.

=== Modern period ===
Ottoman rule came to an end in the First Balkan War of 1912–13, when Montenegro took control of the city on 28 October 1912. On 8 January 1916, during World War I, Austria-Hungary took the city. Peja was taken by Serbian forces under the command of Kosta Pećanac on 13 October 1918, taking approximately 2,000 Austro-Hungarian prisoners of war. After World War I, the city became part of Yugoslavia (at first officially called the Kingdom of Serbs, Croats and Slovenes). Between 1931 and 1941 the city was part of Zeta Banovina.

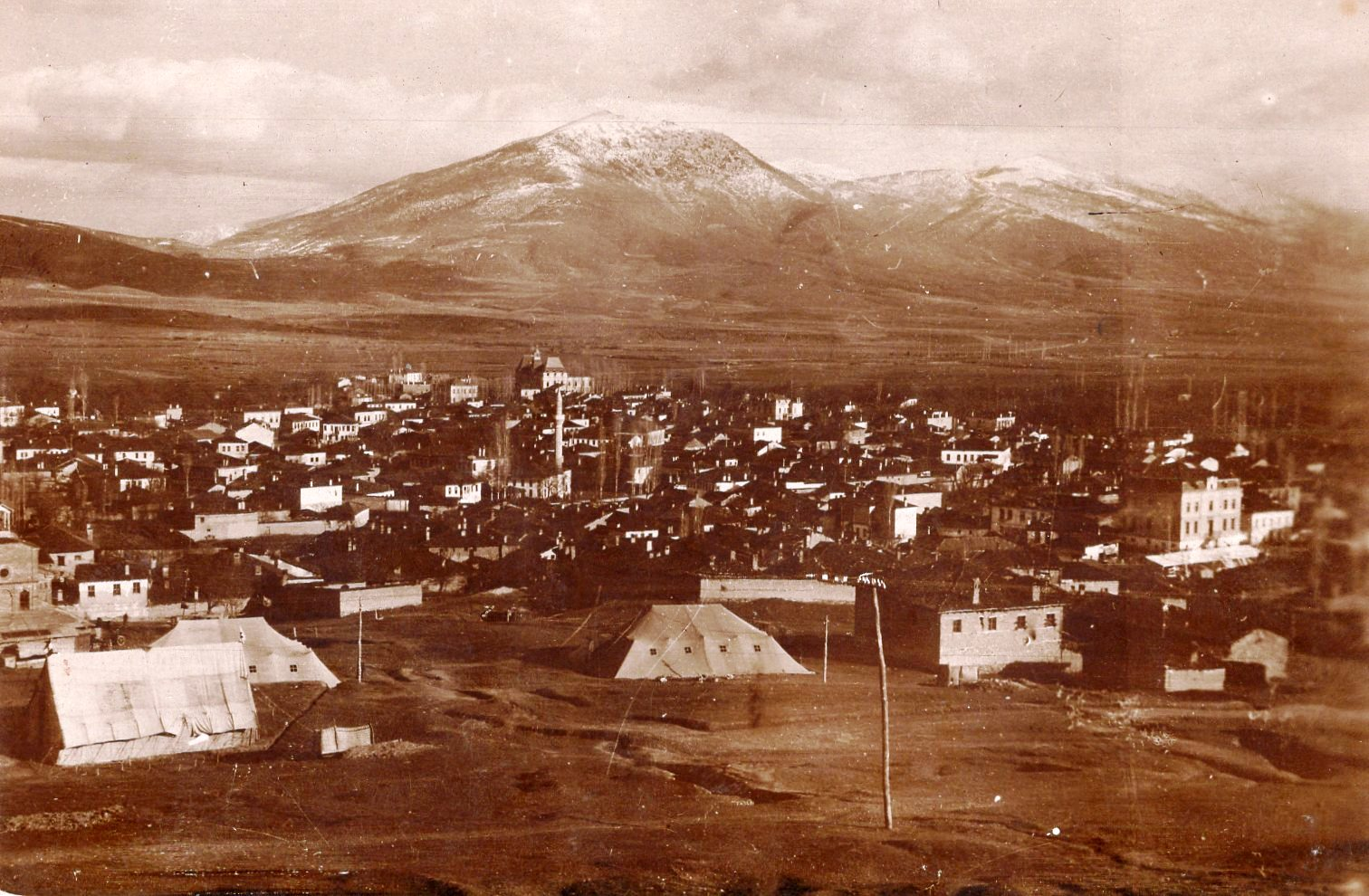
Peja in 1920

During World War II Peja was occupied by the Italian puppet state of Albania. Following Italy's capitulation in the last months of 1943, several hundred Serbs were massacred by Albanian paramilitaries in Peja and its vicinity. The city, together with Rugova were liberated by Albanian LANÇ forces in 1944 during the Kosovo operation. After the war, Peja again became part of Yugoslavia as part of the Autonomous Region of Kosovo and Metohija (1945–1963), an autonomous unit within the Socialist Republic of Serbia.

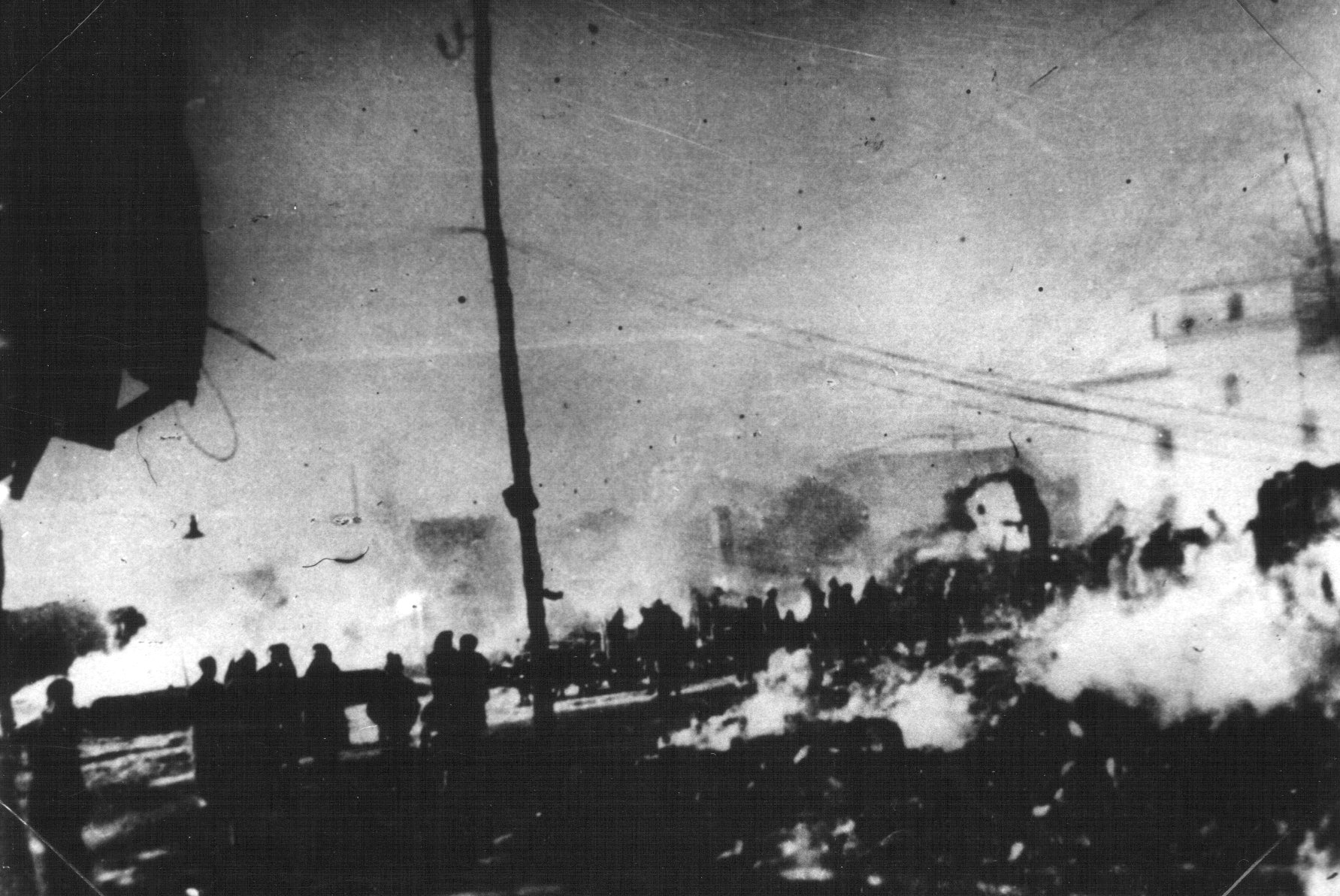
Italians burning the Peja Bazaar in 1943

Relations between Albanians and Serbs and were often tense during the 20th century. They came to a head in the Kosovo War, during which the city suffered heavy damage and mass killings. The Panda Bar massacre occurred in Peja in December 1998. Speculation that the crime may have been committed by the Serbian State Security Directorate had been put forward in the past, but the crime remained unsolved as no new evidence had come forward for a long time. More than 80 percent of the total 5280 houses in the city were heavily damaged (1590) or destroyed (2774) during the war. Peja suffered further damage in violent inter-ethnic unrest in 2004.

== Geography ==
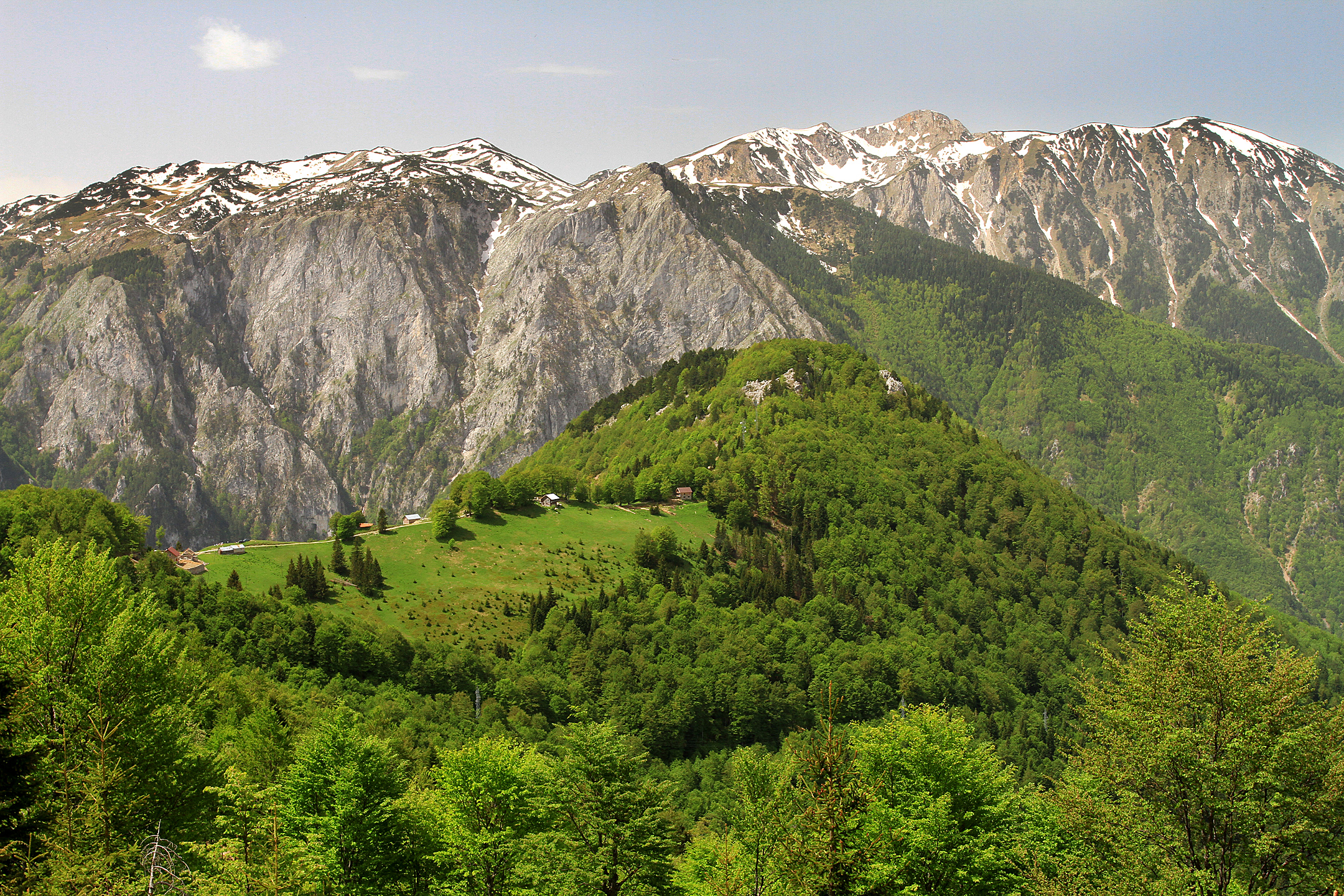
View of the Accursed Mountains near the city of Peja, in the region of Rugova

Peja is located in western Kosovo near the Rugova Canyon or Gorge. Rugova is a mountainous region entered through the north-west part of the city of Peja. It is the third region of Accursed Mountains. In 2013 it became a National Park. Rugova is known for its natural environment and access to the mountains. The city is located some 85 km (53 mi) west of Pristina, 250 km (155 mi) north of Tirana, Albania, 150 km (93 mi) north-west of Skopje, North Macedonia, and some 180 km (112 mi) east of Podgorica, Montenegro.

=== Hydrology ===
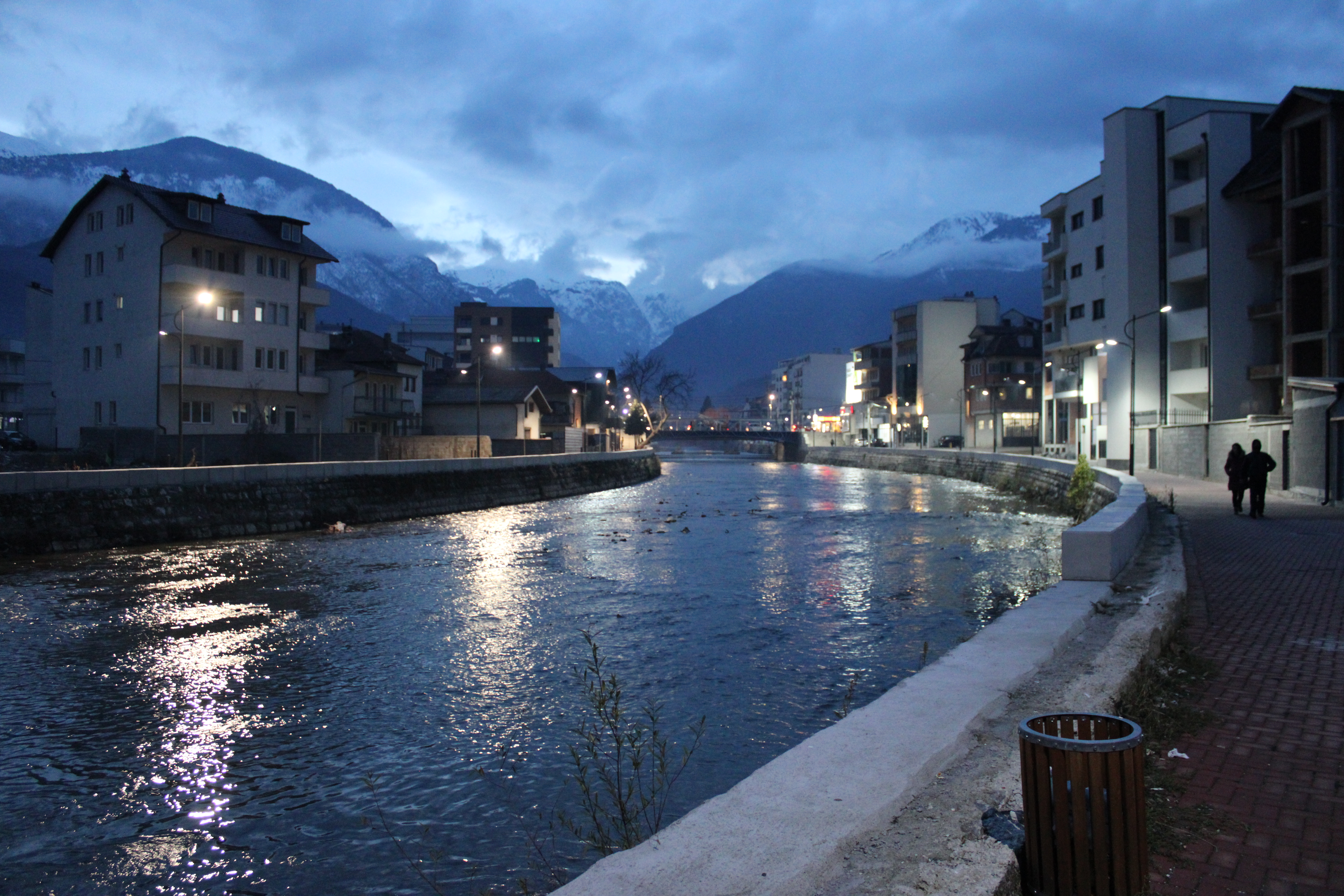
The Lumbardhi i Pejës River flows through the city.

The region of Peja is rich in water resources. The White Drin and Lumbardhi i Pejës rivers pass through the municipality of Peja.

=== Climate ===
Peja has an Oceanic climate (Cfb) as of the Köppen climate classification with an average annual temperature of 9.0 °C (48.2 °F). The warmest month in Peja is August with an average temperature of 19.7 °C (67.5 °F), while the coldest month is January with an average temperature of −1.9 °C (28.6 °F).

Climate data for Peja (1961–1990)
Month	Jan	Feb	Mar	Apr	May	Jun	Jul	Aug	Sep	Oct	Nov	Dec	Year
Record high °C (°F)	15.4 (59.7)	22.6 (72.7)	25.0 (77.0)	28.0 (82.4)	31.5 (88.7)	35.8 (96.4)	38.2 (100.8)	35.9 (96.6)	34.1 (93.4)	28.3 (82.9)	22.9 (73.2)	18.9 (66.0)	38.2 (100.8)
Mean daily maximum °C (°F)	2.8 (37.0)	6.0 (42.8)	10.9 (51.6)	16.1 (61.0)	20.9 (69.6)	24.1 (75.4)	26.5 (79.7)	26.4 (79.5)	22.7 (72.9)	16.9 (62.4)	10.1 (50.2)	4.5 (40.1)	15.7 (60.3)
Daily mean °C (°F)	−0.5 (31.1)	2.1 (35.8)	6.4 (43.5)	11.2 (52.2)	15.9 (60.6)	19.0 (66.2)	21.1 (70.0)	20.8 (69.4)	17.2 (63.0)	11.8 (53.2)	5.9 (42.6)	1.2 (34.2)	11.1 (52.0)
Mean daily minimum °C (°F)	−3.6 (25.5)	−1.5 (29.3)	2.0 (35.6)	6.1 (43.0)	10.3 (50.5)	13.3 (55.9)	15.0 (59.0)	14.8 (58.6)	11.5 (52.7)	6.8 (44.2)	2.3 (36.1)	−1.8 (28.8)	6.3 (43.3)
Record low °C (°F)	−24.8 (−12.6)	−19.3 (−2.7)	−13.6 (7.5)	−3.8 (25.2)	0.6 (33.1)	3.5 (38.3)	6.7 (44.1)	5.2 (41.4)	−1.2 (29.8)	−4.8 (23.4)	−15.3 (4.5)	−15.2 (4.6)	−24.8 (−12.6)
Average precipitation mm (inches)	85.9 (3.38)	71.5 (2.81)	65.2 (2.57)	67.2 (2.65)	68.2 (2.69)	53.0 (2.09)	54.7 (2.15)	48.0 (1.89)	52.1 (2.05)	75.3 (2.96)	118.2 (4.65)	91.4 (3.60)	850.7 (33.49)
Average precipitation days (≥ 0.1 mm)	12.0	12.3	11.3	11.5	13.0	13.2	9.9	8.7	8.1	9.5	12.3	13.3	135.1
Average snowy days	8.1	6.0	3.7	0.6	0.0	0.0	0.0	0.0	0.0	0.1	2.0	6.5	27.0
Average relative humidity (%)	81	75	68	63	64	64	60	60	67	73	81	83	70
Mean monthly sunshine hours	69.5	93.3	143.0	172.0	207.8	257.7	274.3	264.9	206.3	152.6	86.8	55.3	1,983.5
Source: Republic Hydrometeorological Service of Serbia

== Politics ==
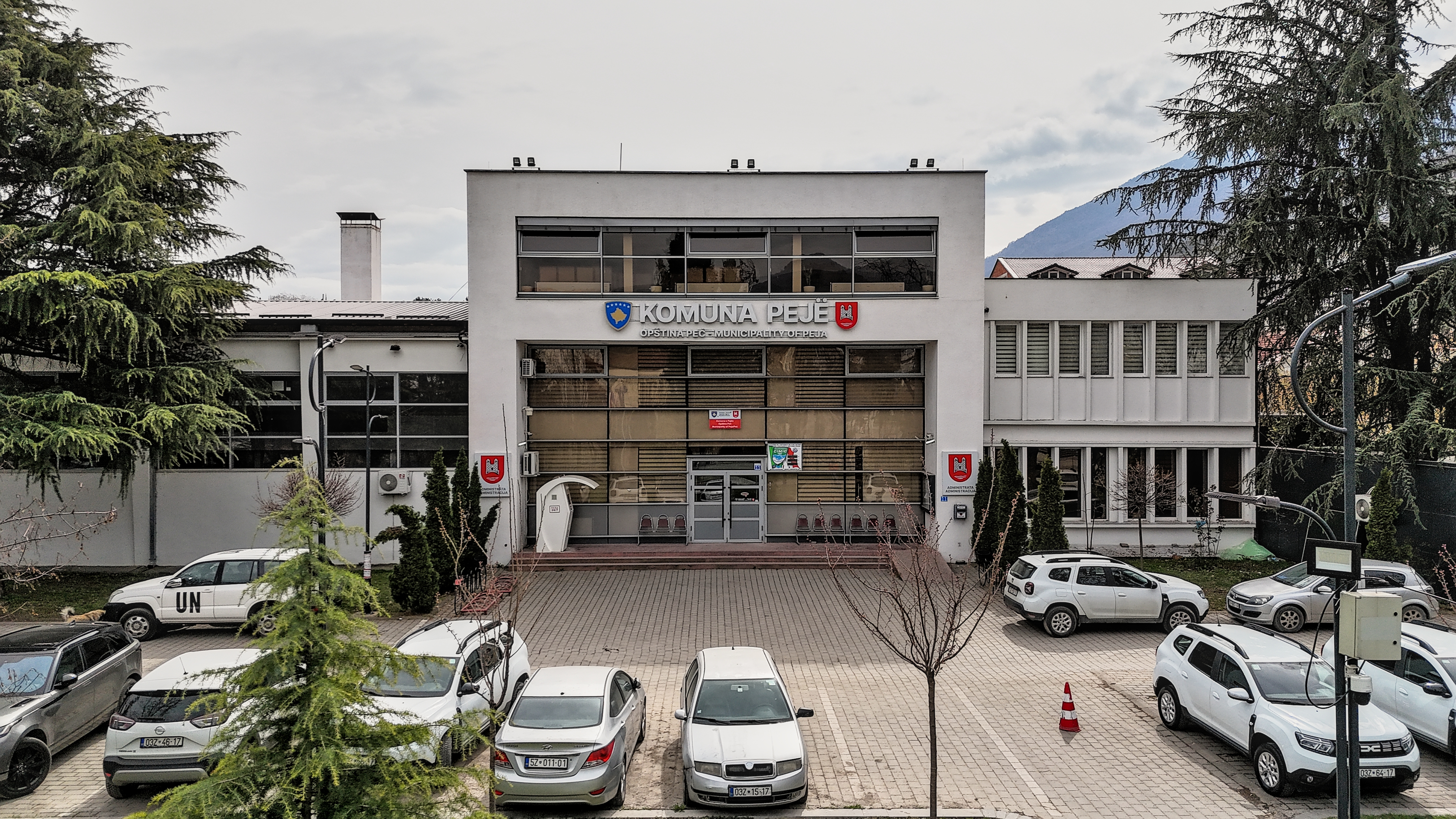
Municipality building of Peja

The municipality covers an area of 602 km^{2} (232 sq mi), including the city of Peja and 95 villages; it is divided into 28 territorial communities. As of 2011, the whole municipality has a population of approximately 95,723, of which ca. 48,962 live in the city of Peja.

== Economy ==
=== Tourism ===
Peja is a central hub for tourism in western Kosovo, offering a range of cultural, historical, and natural attractions. The city has developed a growing tourism infrastructure, including a tourist information center located on Mbretëresha Teutë Street. A notable offering is the "Trail of Cultural Monuments," a self-guided walking route through Peja's historical center, including a trail through the sites of the Bajrakli Mosque, the Hamam Mosque, Haxhi Zeka's Mill, the Peja Regional Museum located in the former Tahir Bey guesthouse, and several traditional Albanian kullas (tower houses).

Located just west of the city, Rugova Canyon (Gryka e Rugovës) is a prominent natural feature extending approximately 25 kilometers into the Accursed Mountains. The area offers a variety of outdoor activities, including hiking, climbing, and mountain biking. Several peaks exceeding 2,400 meters—such as Guri i Kuq, Hajla, and Çfërla—are accessible via marked trails. Adventure infrastructure in Rugova includes four Via Ferrata routes—Ari, Mat, Marimangat, and Shpella—constructed between 2013 and 2016 according to international safety standards. The Rugova Zip Line, at 700 meters in length, is currently the longest in Kosovo and is located within the canyon area.

Peja serves as one of the key entry points to the Peaks of the Balkans Trail, a 192-kilometer transnational hiking route that connects Kosovo, Albania, and Montenegro. The route, divided into 10 stages, typically requires 10 to 12 days to complete and includes alpine landscapes, remote villages, and high mountain passes. Skiing is available at the ski center in Bogë nearby.

Approximately 12 kilometers from Peja is the White Drin Waterfall, a protected natural monument located near the village of Radavc. Nearby is Bukuroshja e Fjetur Cave (Sleeping Beauty Cave), a karst cave formation situated in the Accursed Mountains, noted for its geological features.

Wellness tourism is also present in the region through the Banja of Peja (locally known as Ilixhe), located in the neighboring municipality of Istog. The spa area is known for its thermal mineral springs and facilities focused on therapeutic treatments and rehabilitation services.

Peja is home to several tour operators that offer services for both domestic and international tourists. Among these, Balkan Natural Adventure and Outdoor Kosovo are prominent agencies that provides guided treks, climbing activities, and multi-day tours across Kosovo and the wider Peaks of the Balkans region.

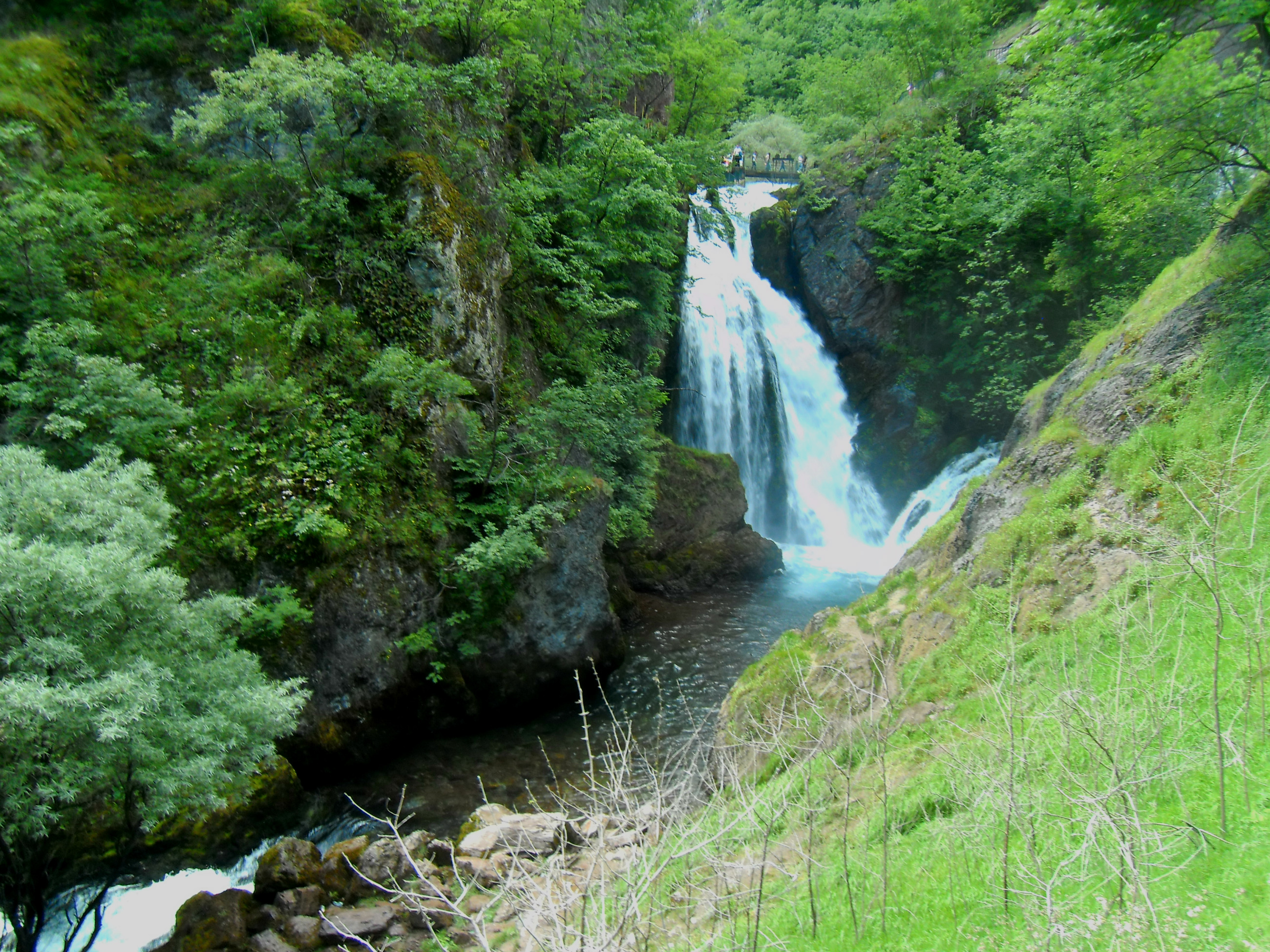
The White Drin Waterfall is considered to be the source of White Drin river.

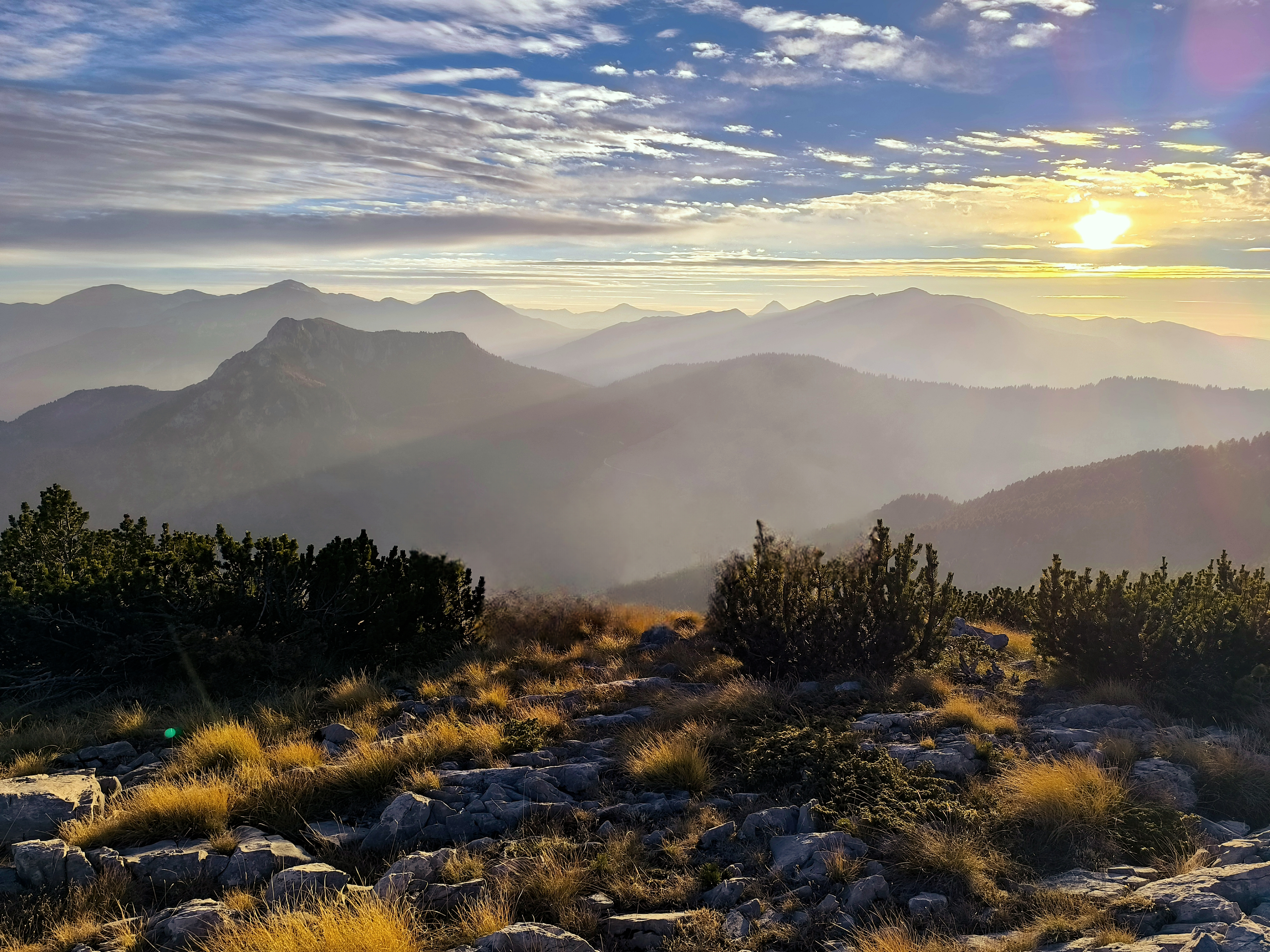
The landscape above the Rusolia summit

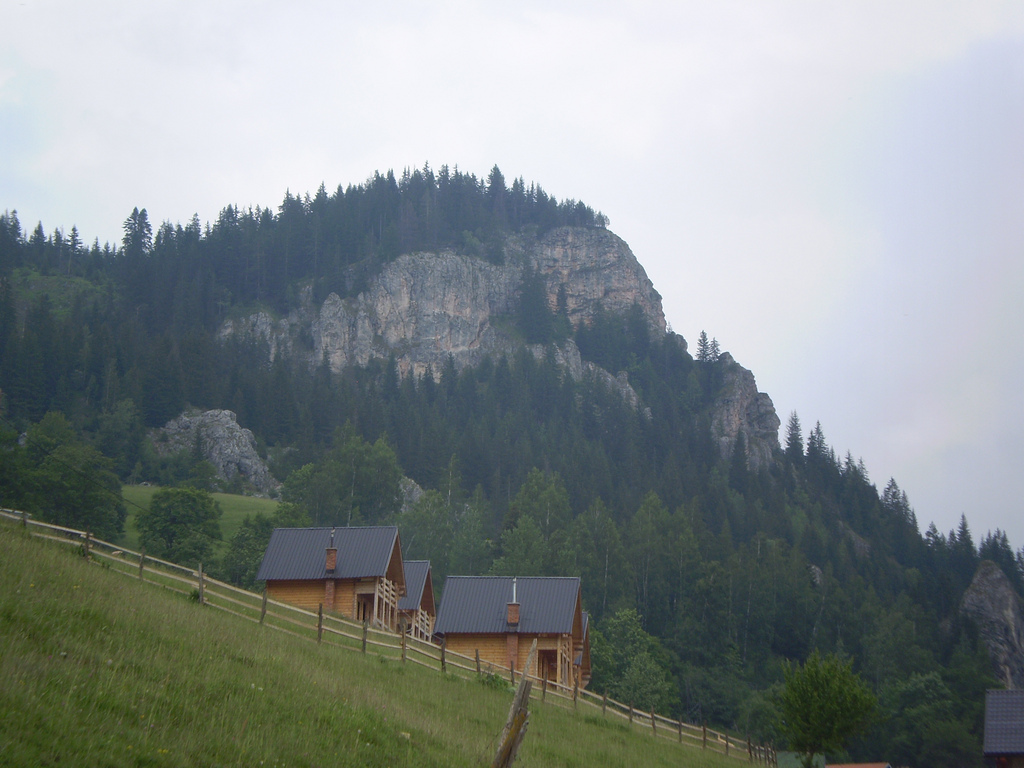
Ski center in Bogë, Rugova. The region of Rugova is well known for its ski resorts.

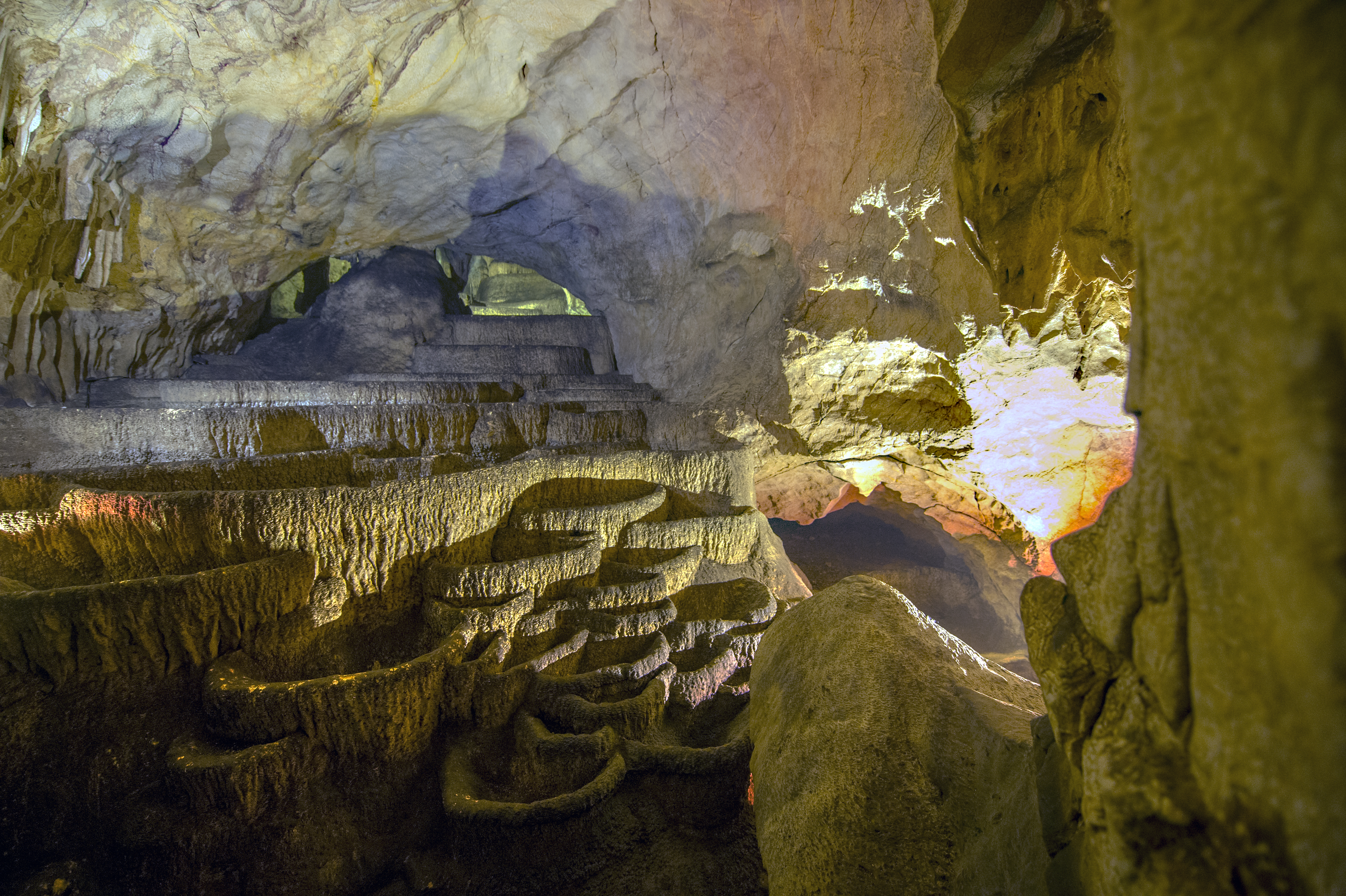
Bukuroshja e Fjetur Cave is one of the few caves in Kosovo.

== Infrastructure ==
=== Education ===
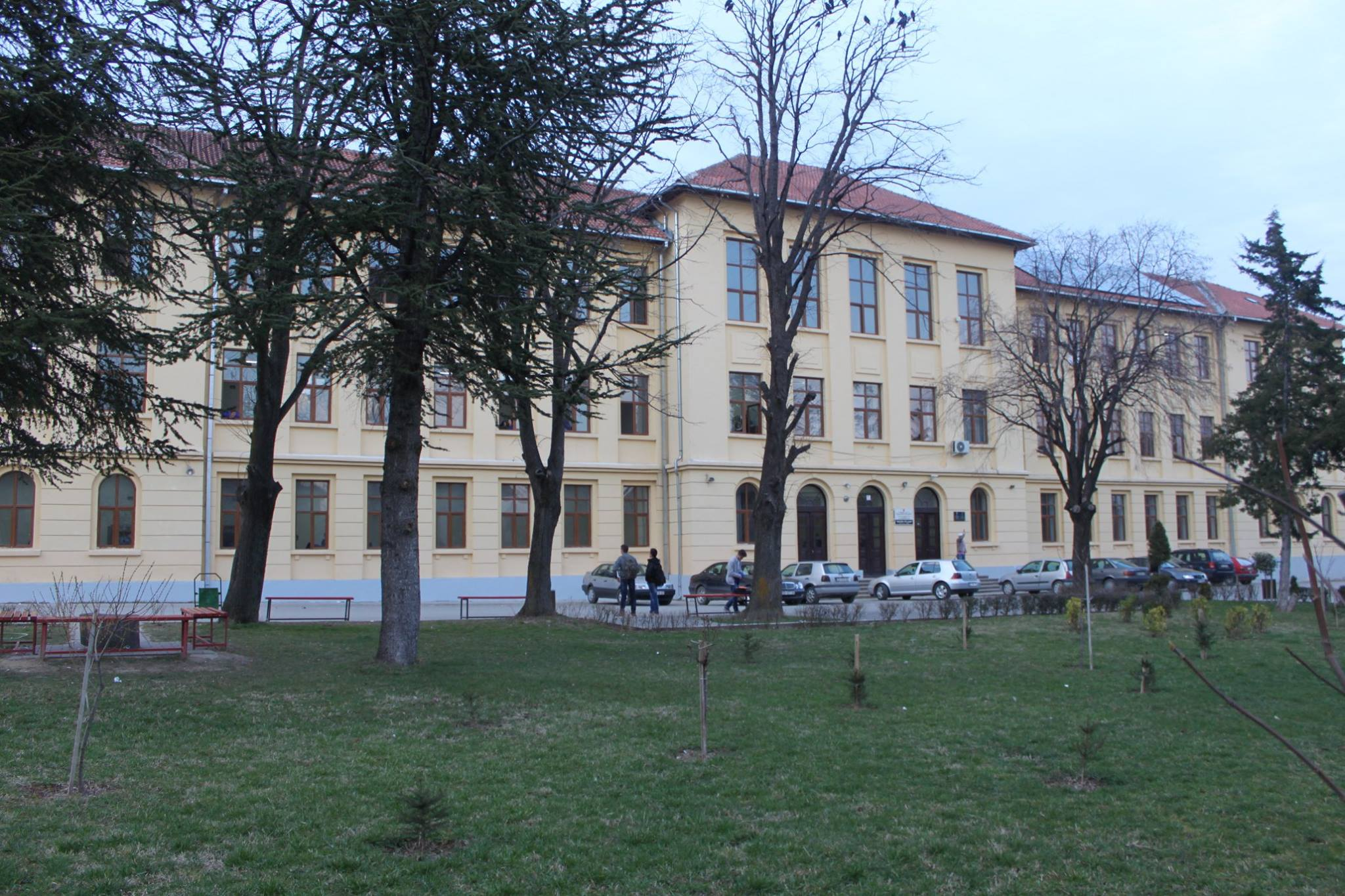
Bedri Pejani Gymnasium

Education in Peja is a system with no tuition or fees, mandatory for all children between the ages of 6–18. It consists of a nine-year basic comprehensive school (starting at age six and ending at the age of fifteen) secondary general and professional education commonly known as high school and higher education at Haxhi Zeka University. It also includes non-mandatory daycare programs for babies and toddlers and a one-year "preschool". The school year runs from early September to late June of the following year. Winter break runs from late December to early January, dividing the school year into two semesters. Peja is the only city in Kosovo that offers high school education in arts and there is also a school for the visually impaired.

=== Water supply and sewage ===
Peja has two main water sources, the White Drin and the "Ujë i bardhë" source. These two sources supply the entire city of Peja together with 18 villages with clean drinking water. The water is filtered in several stations located across the city, as well as disinfected with the use of chlorine. The capacity for the two water systems is 1,200 l/s, however during the summer nearly 70% of water is lost due to technical issues, illegal logging and old pipes, leading to issues for the people of Peja. Recent attempts have been made by the creation of organizations such as "GEUK" to fix the problems of water supplies and sewage systems in Peja however despite this many problems still remain. The sewage system of Peja was projected in 1976 and was built in the late 70s. It spans 73 km covering 63% of the urban population, however it is not present in most villages. The sewage system of the city has several issues, with it not covering parts of the urban and rural population, inadequate dimensions for the network and the usage of the Lumbardh of Peja as a disposal for sewage water. Water supplies and sewage waters are managed by the local company "Hidrodrini", while the sewage system is managed by the municipal government.

== Demography ==
Historical population
Year	Pop.	±% p.a.
1948	47,009	—
1953	53,548	+2.64%
1961	66,656	+2.77%
1971	90,124	+3.06%
1981	111,071	+2.11%
1991	127,796	+1.41%
2011	96,450	−1.40%
2024	82,745	−1.17%
Source: Division of Kosovo

According to the last census of 2024 conducted by Kosovo Agency of Statistics, the municipality of Peja has 82,745 inhabitants.

According to the 1981 census, the city urban area had a population of 54,497 inhabitants; according to the 1991 census it had grown to 68,163. According to the 2011 census, around 49,000 people live in the city of Peja.

The population is predominantly Albanian, comprising 91.22% of the residents. The largest minority group consists of Bosniaks, making up 3.59% of the population. Additionally, Egyptians account for 2.32%, Roma for 1.07%, and the remaining residents are Serbs, Ashkali and Gorani.

The ethnic composition of the municipality:

Ethnic Composition in the municipality
Year/Population	Albanians	%	Bosniaks	%	Roma (Ashkali, Egyptians)	%	Montenegrins	%	Serbs	%	Others	%	Total
1961 Census	41,532	62.35	1,397	2.1	728	1.09	12,701	19.05	8,852	13.28			66,656
1971 Census	63,193	70.12	5,203	5.77	433	0.48	11,306	12.54	9,298	10.31			90,124
1981 Census	79,965	71.99	8,739	7.86	3,844	3.46	9,796	8.82	7,995	7.2			111,071
1991 Census	96,441	75.5	9,875	7.72	4,442	3.5	6,960	5.44	7,815	6.11			127,796
January 1999	~104,600	~92	n/a	n/a	~3,500–4,000	~3.3	n/a	n/a	n/a	n/a	~4,000–4,200	~3.6	~113,000
2011 Census	87,975	91.2	3,786	3.9	3,836	3.9			332	0.4	521	0.5	96,450
2024 Census	75,479	91.2	2,974	3.59	3,114	3.76			813	0.98	365	0.44	82,745
Source: Yugoslav Population Censuses for data through 1991, OSCE estimates for data from 1999, 2011 and 2024 census from the Kosovo Agency of Statistics.

== Culture ==
=== Architecture ===
The architecture in Peja show different architectural styles, from the medieval Serbian, Ottoman, Yugoslav, and contemporary architecture. Because of this there are many churches, mosques, buildings which are attraction points in the city and were built by the aforementioned influences.

Notable architectural traits of Peja include:

- Home of Tahir Beg, dates back to the 18th century and is a monument of cultural heritage in Peja, Kosovo. The Ethnographic Museum of Peja is currently located in Tahir Beg's Mansion.
- Bajrakli Mosque, Ottoman-built mosque in the Bazaar of Peja. It was destroyed during World War II and then rebuilt.
- Hamam of Peja, Ottoman-era bath
- Bazaar of Peja, Ottoman-era market in the center of the city. It was destroyed during World War II and the Kosovo War. It has been fully rebuilt.
- Patriarchate of Peć, Medieval Serbian style monastery built in the 13th century.
- Soliteri, Brutalist style apartment complex considered as a "sky scraper".
- Peja train station, 1930s train station hailed as a cultural heritage site of Kosovo.

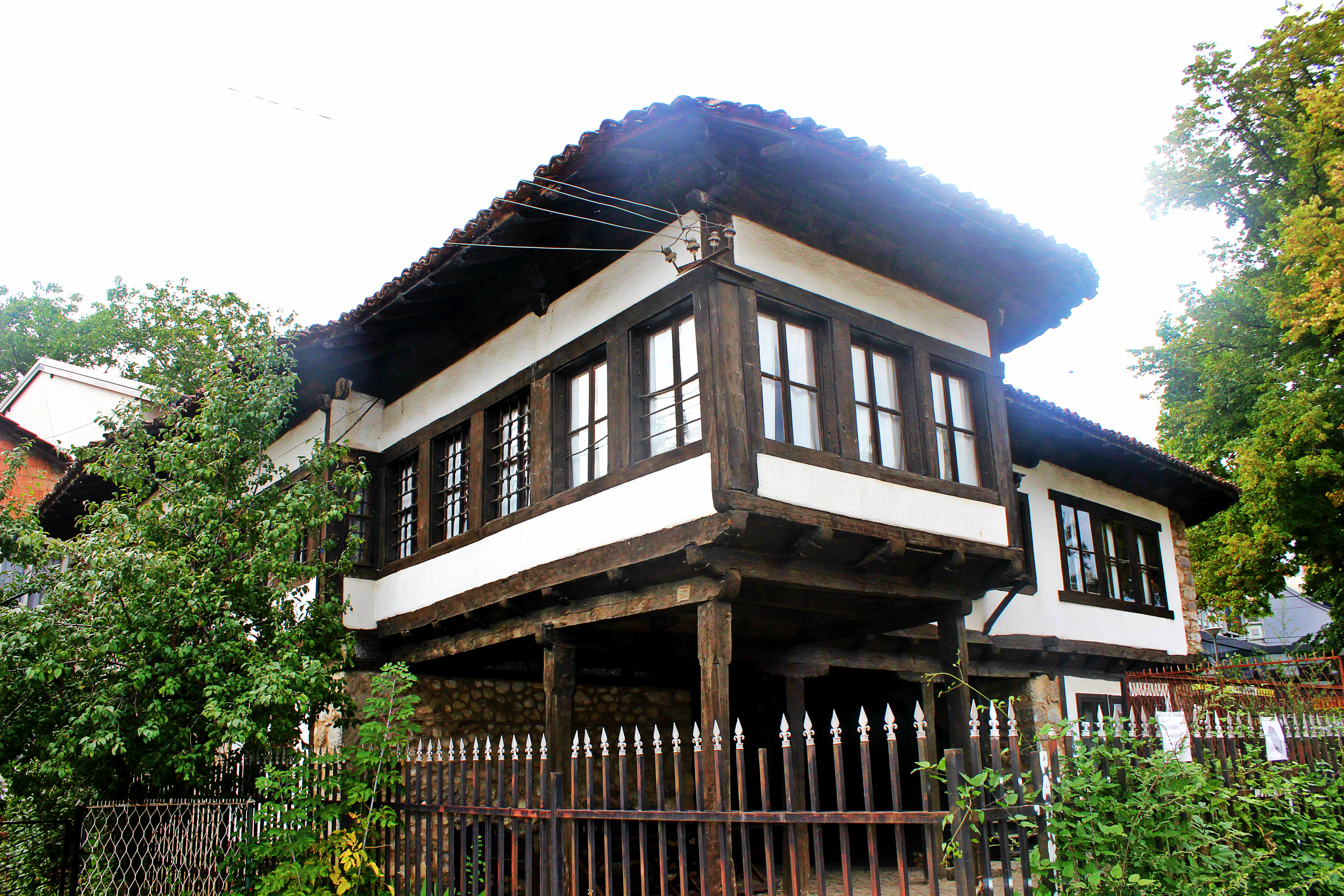
Home of Tahir Beg in Peja is today an ethnological museum.

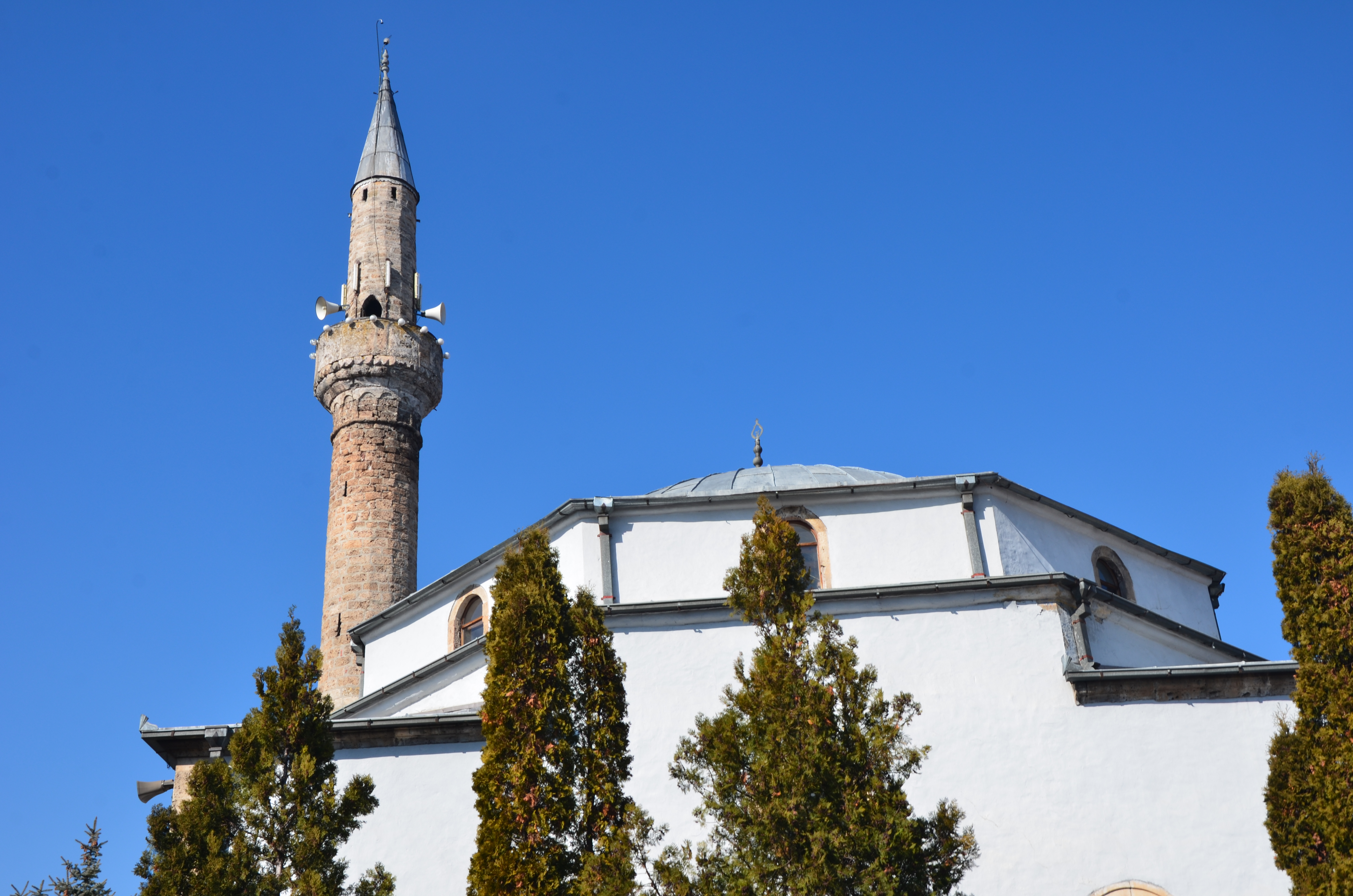
The Bajrakli Mosque is the main mosque situated in the center of the Bazaar of Peja and it was built in 1471.

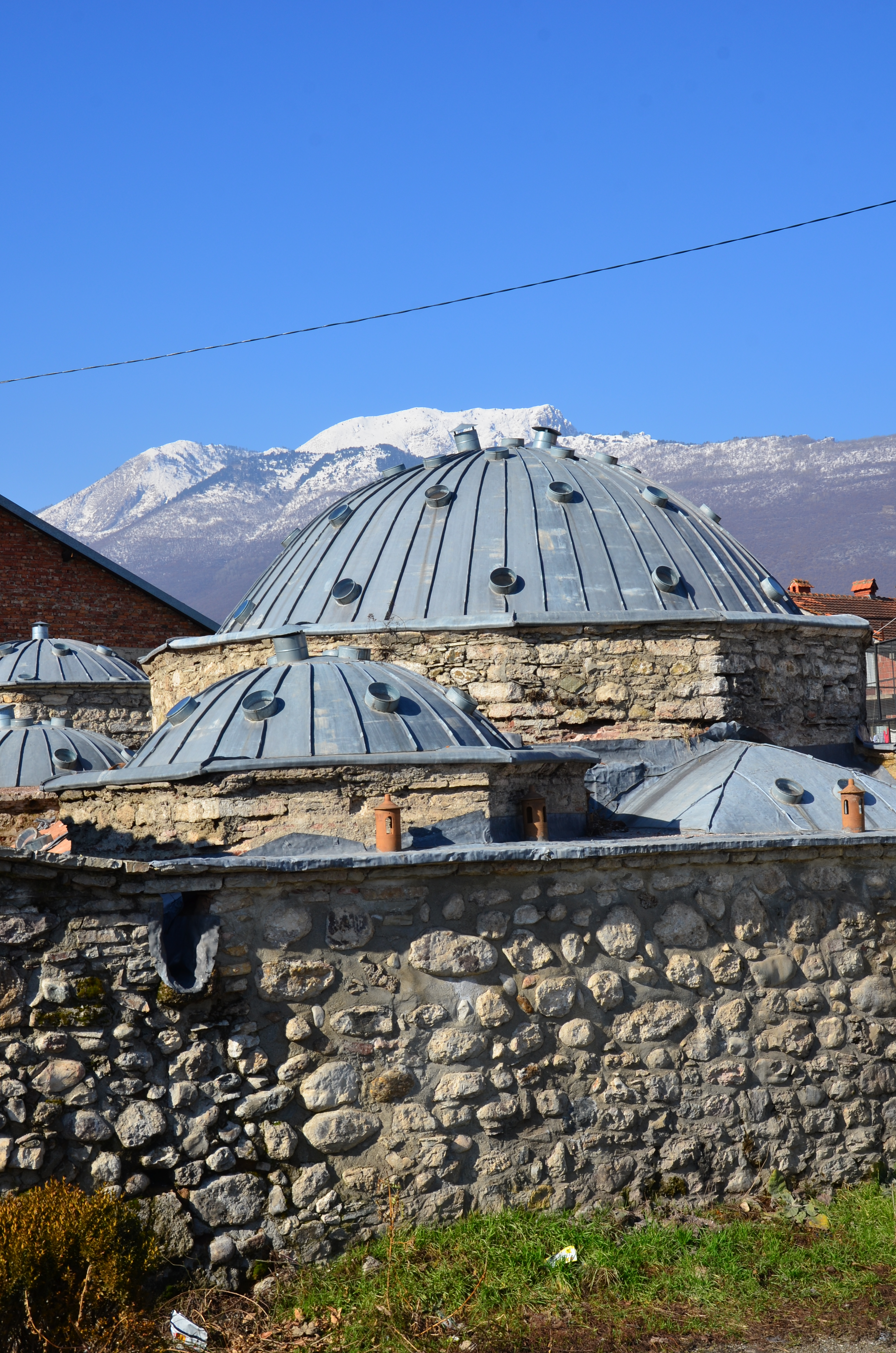
The Hamam of Peja is an Ottoman bath built in the 15th century.

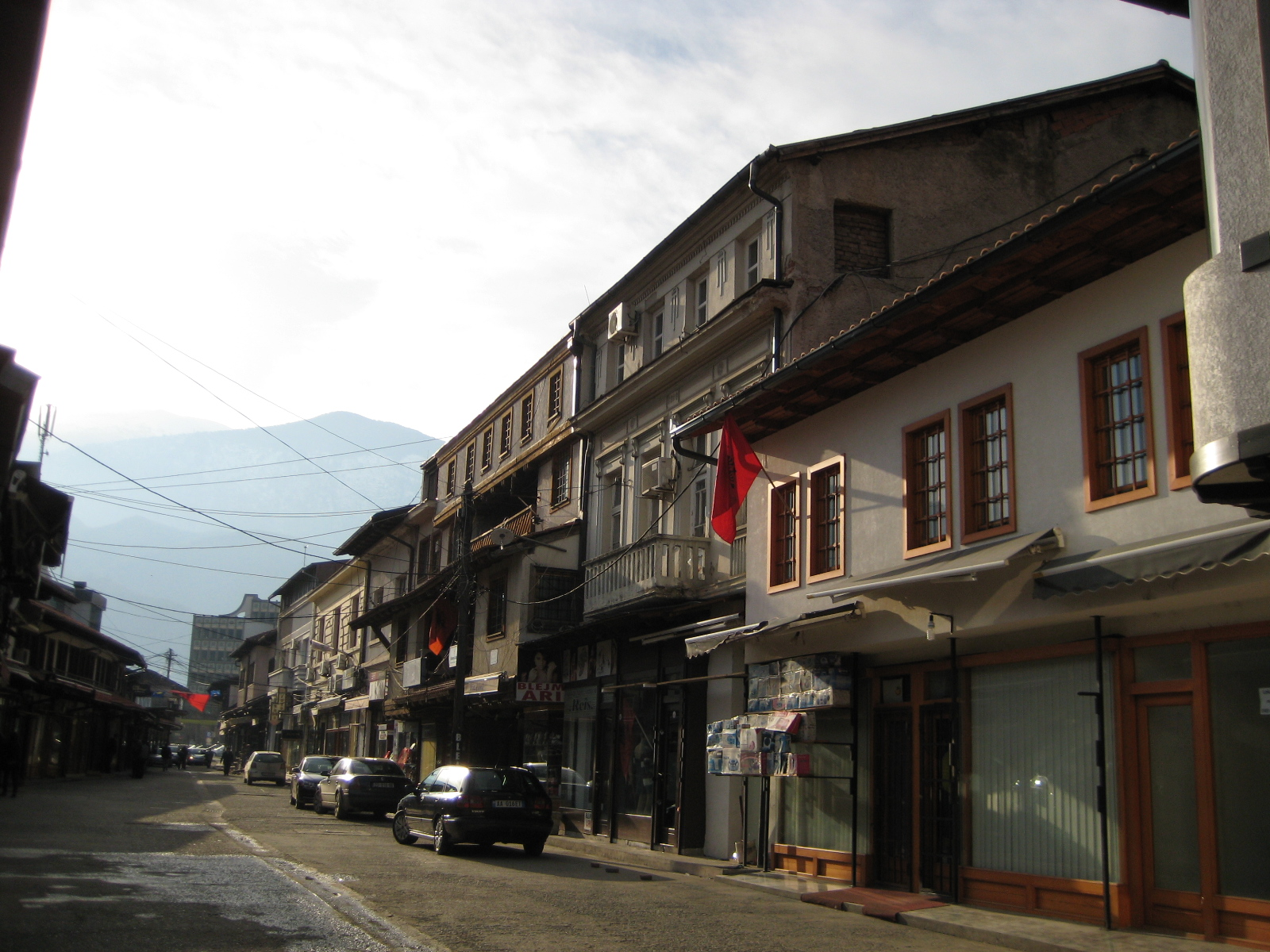
Bazaar of Peja is a market place in the center of the city of Peja.

=== Cinema ===
Peja has one local cinema, Kinema Jusuf Gërvalla, which also functions as a cultural center. It was built in 1955 with money of the Workers' Union. Back then, the cinema was called 'Kino Rad' ('Workers' Cinema'). Its goals were to provide a cultural space in the city of Peja. During the period 1955-1998 it served as a central point of joint cultural activities for the residents of Peja. Activities included screenings of the latest films, public discussions, music concerts, theatrical performances and children's programs. The cinema was closed down when the war started in 1998 and was heavily damaged in the years after, just like the rest of Peja. In 2000, the building was renovated and partly reconstructed. In 2001, the cinema was reopened, with its name changed to 'Kinema Jusuf Gërvalla' in 2002. However, activities became more sporadic, due to technical difficulties and lack of public interest.

In 2016, by a municipal decision, the cinema with all its assets was given to the non-governmental organization Anibar, which since 2010 organized the Anibar International Animation Festival in the cinema. The goal was to revitalize Kinema Jusuf Gërvalla. But later that year the Privatization Agency of Kosovo put the building on the list of buildings for privatization, which meant it would lose its public function. However, backlash emerged against the idea of taking this important historic and cultural site from the local community. The protests secured Kinema Jusuf Gërvalla a spot on the temporary list of protected cultural heritage buildings in Kosovo. Currently, Kinema Jusuf Gërvalla is functioning as a cultural center which hosts movie screenings, musical performances, poetry nights, board game nights, and more. It also offers guided tours, which introduces you to the rich history of the cinema.

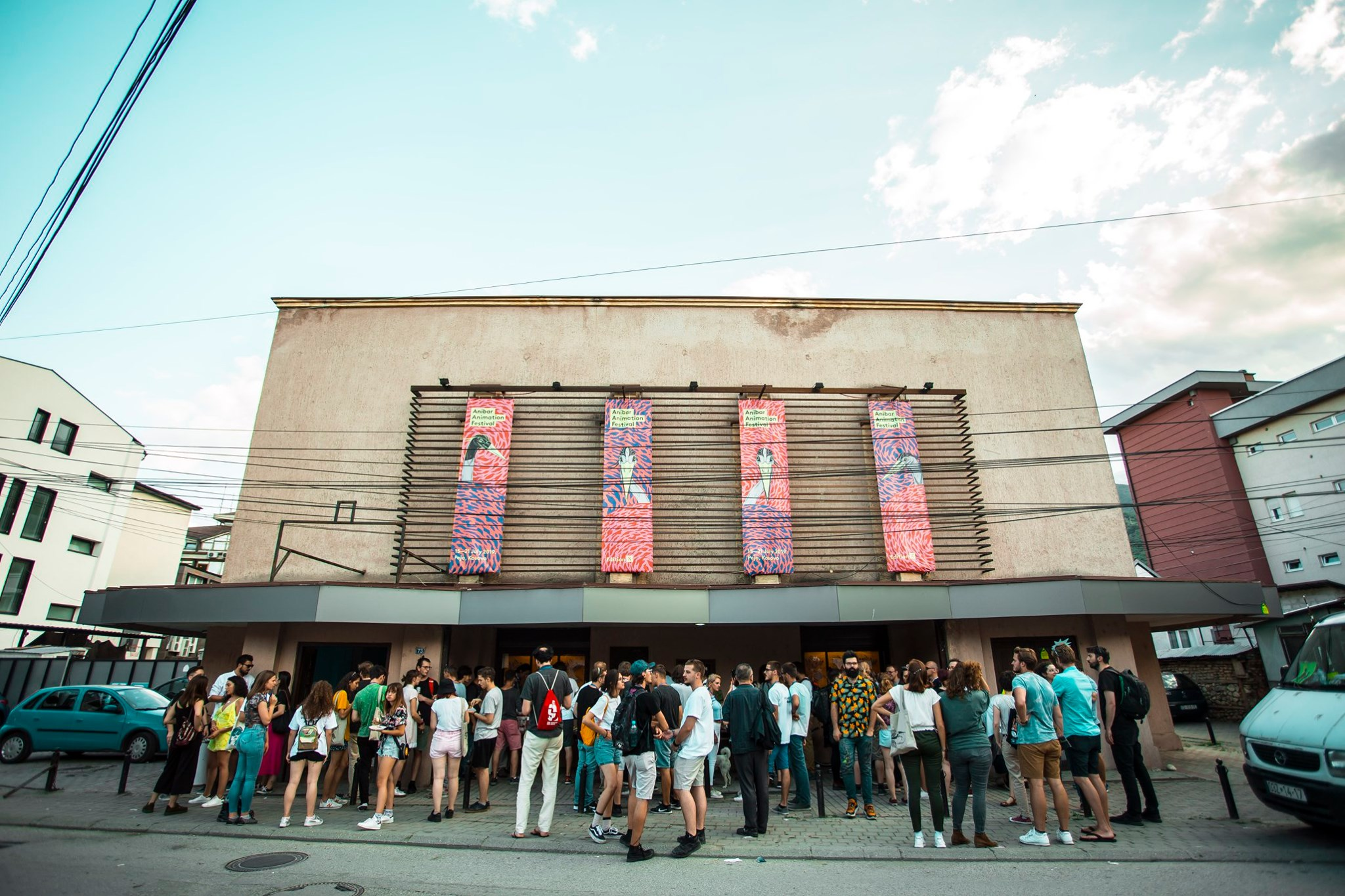
Kinema Jusuf Gërvalla

Several films have been shot and produced in Peja. One of which is the German adventure film, The Shoot (Der Schut), in 1964. "Uka of the Accursed Mountains" (Uka i Bjeshkëve të Nemura), released in 1968, also known as "The Love of the Accursed Mountains", which was shot and took place in Peja, was one of the most groundbreaking early Kosovar films. It starred Pejan actor Faruk Begolli.

=== Festivals ===
- Anibar International Animation Festival
- Into the Park
- Shqip film fest

=== Sport ===
Peja is one of the more successful cities in Kosovan sport. The city is home to the first Olympic Medal for Kosovo, won by Judoka Majlinda Kelmendi in Rio de Janeiro Games in 2016. Her team also has won numerous other medals including gold and bronze in the World and European championships.

The main football team of the city is FC Besa Pejë and its basketball teams is KB Peja. Additionally the city is host to a handball team, KH Besa Famiglia, a volleyball team KV Besa, a judo team Ippon, an athletic team Besa, as well as a women's basketball team KB Penza. Since June 2008 Peja has also a Taekwondo Team: Tae Kwon Do Club Peja (Klubi i Tae Kwon Do-së Peja).

Peja has its aeroclub called "Aeroklub Peja", which was founded in 1948. Last years this club is part of competitions in several countries. In June 2013 it was the organizer of "second Paragliding event" which included paragliders from Kosovo and Albania. In 2014 it was the organizer of an international contest called "Peja Open Paragliding Cup 2014".

=== Music ===
Many well-known and highly acclaimed musicians come from Peja. British-Kosovar singer Dua Lipa traces her family lineage back to the nearby village of Lipa. Albina Kelmendi, who represented Albania at the 2023 Eurovision Song Contest also hails from Peja. Other notable musicians include Memli Kelmendi, Arlind Bardhi, Xhevdet Bakraqi and many more.

Several music festivals also take place in the city, such as Peja Jazz and Ranch Fest 2025.

Peja also has a music school, the "Halit Kasapolli" school which offers education for ages 15-18.

The 1950s and 60s marked a significant rise in the popularity of Orchestras in the city. The most famous one was the "Mandolina" Orchestra, a female orchestra made up of 22 members. The conductor, Franjo Vaculini was formerly the conductor for the National Orchestra of King Zog.

== International relations ==
Peja is twinned with:

- Afyonkarahisar, Turkey
- Bağcılar, Turkey
- Berane, Montenegro
- Eger, Hungary
- Fier, Albania
- Gusinje, Montenegro
- Hörby, Sweden
- Johnston, United States
- Nilüfer, Turkey
- Stari Grad (Sarajevo), Bosnia and Herzegovina
- Yalova, Turkey

== See also ==
- List of people from Peja
