= Bazaar of Peja =

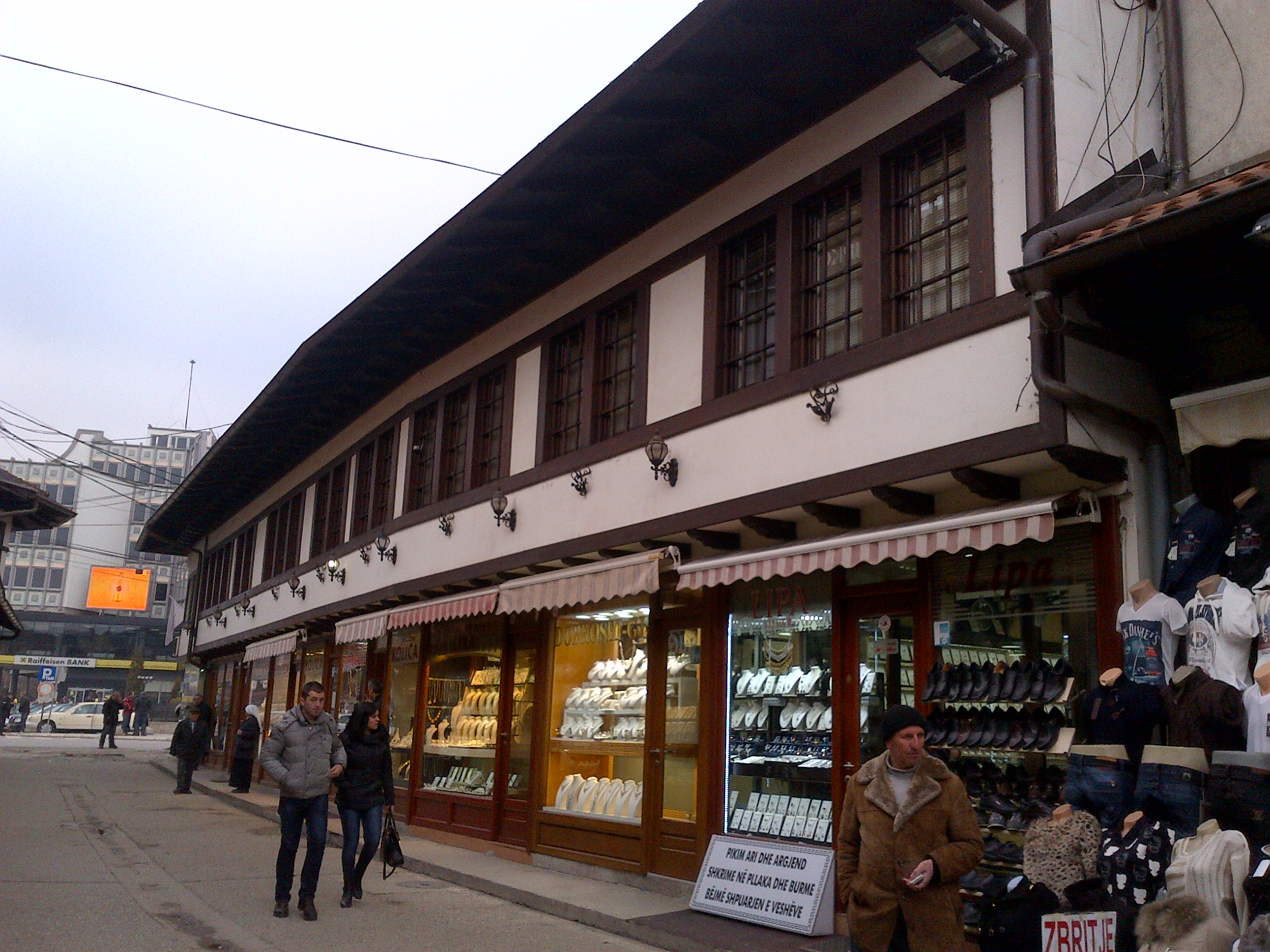
Bazaar of Peja serves as the main market for Gold shops

Bazaar of Peja (Albanian: Çarshia e Pejës; Serbian: Пазар у Пећи / Pazar u Peći) or Peja market is a market place in the center of the city of Peja, in Kosovo. It was established during Ottoman rule and is located near the Lumbardhi i Pejës river, between parallel residence zones. The market historically housed blacksmiths and carpenters but also facilitated the agricultural market. The market place was completely destroyed at least twice, once during the Italian occupation in 1943, and once during the Kosovo War (1998–99). The market was fully rebuilt after the Kosovo War, according to the historical Ottoman architecture, and serves as the main market in the city of Peja, and is one of the many monuments which are under protection by the Republic of Kosovo. The main street of the market is known in Albanian as Çarshia e Gjatë (English: Long Bazaar).

== Gallery ==
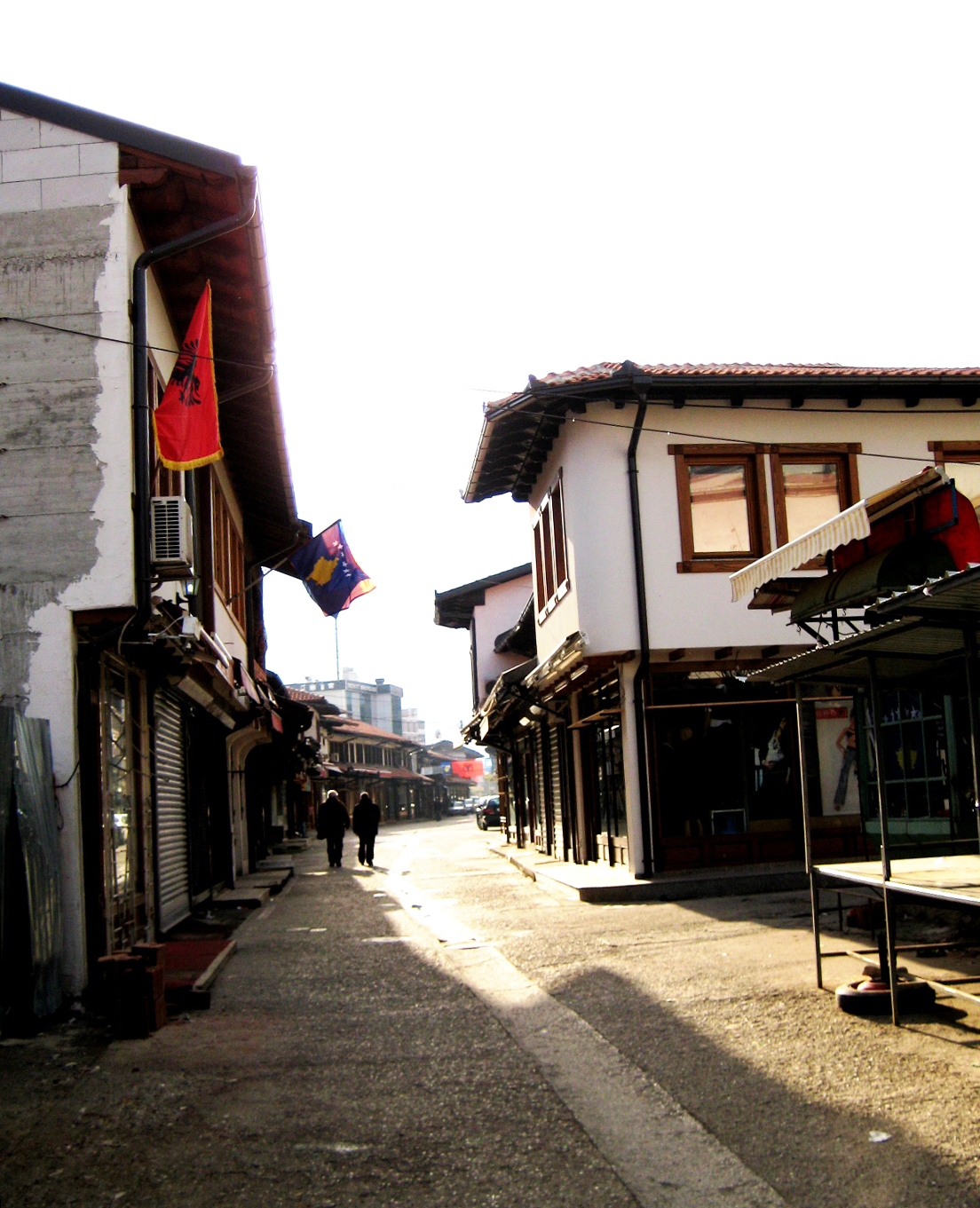
Bazaar of Peja shown with many shops closed on a Sunday

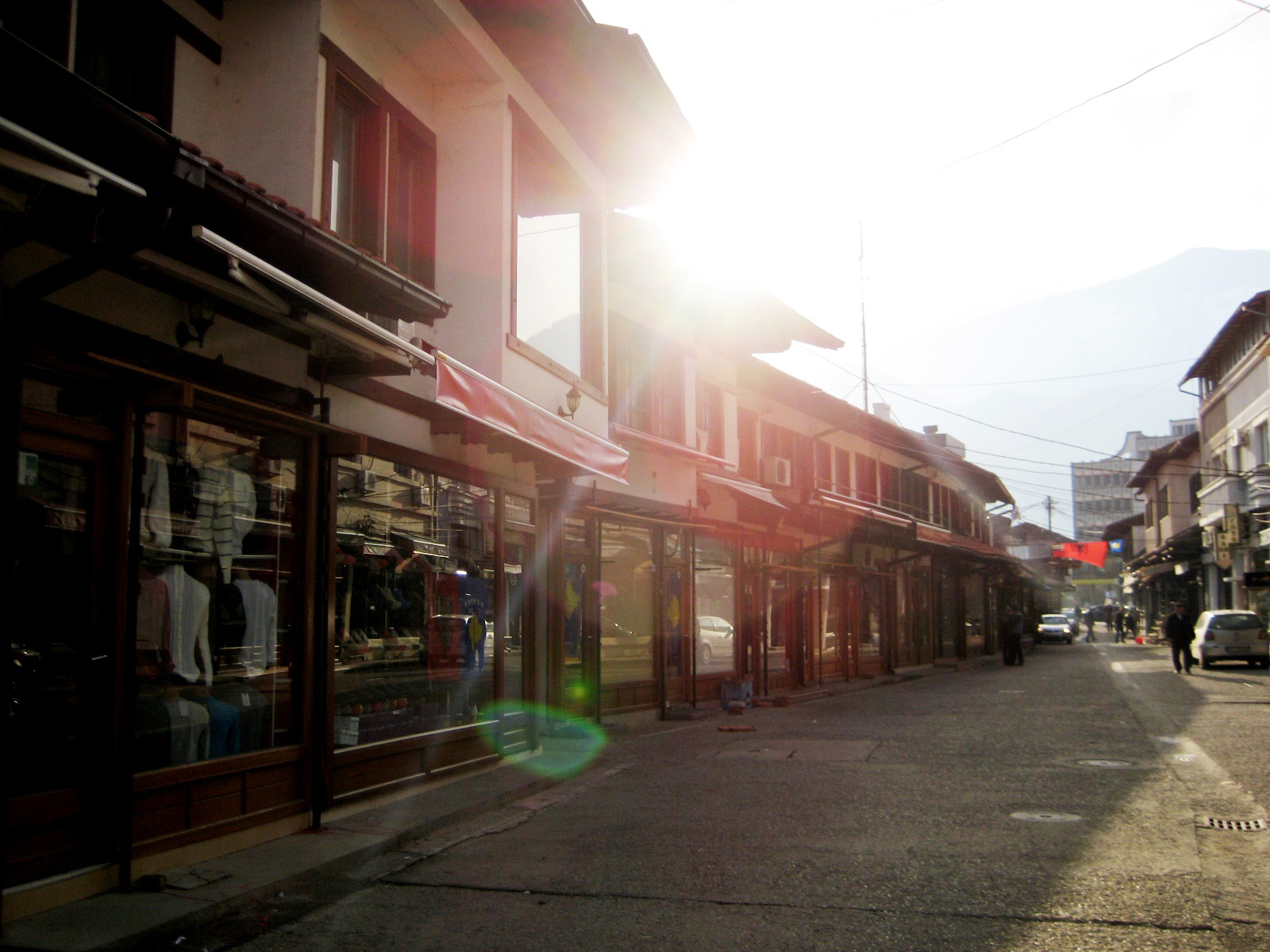
Bazaar of Peja closed on a Sunday

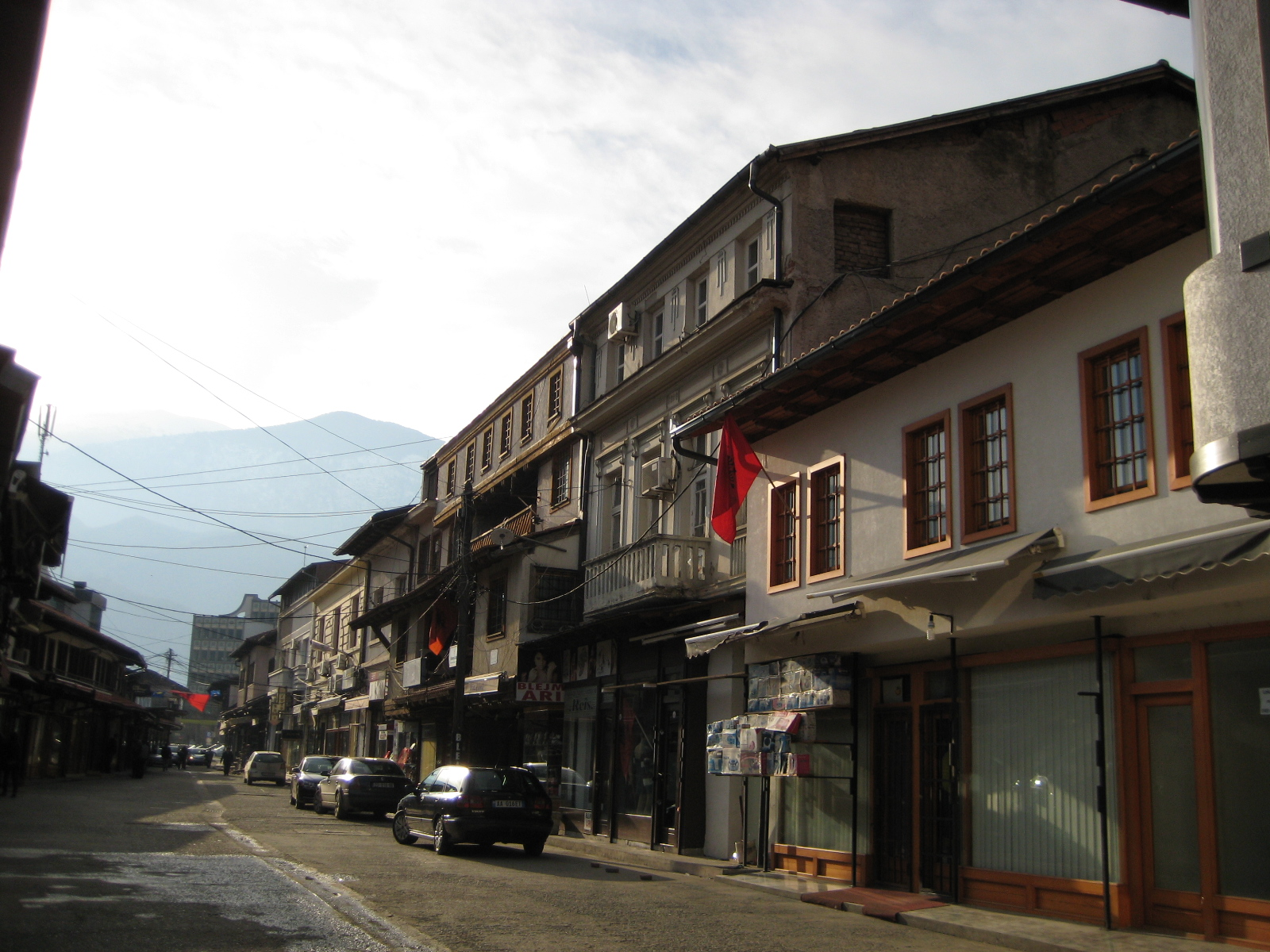
Bazaar of Peja
