= Cultural Heritage under Permanent Protection (Kosovo) =

List of cultural heritage assets under protection in Kosovo

Cultural Heritage under Permanent Protection (Albanian: Trashëgimia Kulturore në Mbrotje të Përhershme) is the designation given to cultural heritage assets that have been formally placed under permanent protection by the institutions responsible for cultural heritage in the Republic of Kosovo. The status is established under Law No. 02/L-88 on Cultural Heritage and associated secondary legislation.

The permanent-protection system covers cultural heritage belonging to the categories of architectural, archaeological, movable and spiritual heritage. The legislation also recognizes as part of cultural heritage framework.

As of February 2026, the Kosovo Council for Cultural Heritage reported that 93 cultural heritage assets held permanent-protection status in Kosovo.

== Legal framework ==
The legal basis for the protection of cultural heritage in Kosovo is Law No. 02/L-88 on Cultural Heritage, promulgated on 1 July 2008. The law establishes procedures for the inventory, documentation, assessment, selection, protection, conservation, restoration, administration and presentation of cultural heritage.

The law distinguishes between temporary and permanent protection. Cultural heritage identified through the inventory process may initially be placed under temporary protection. Assets proposed for permanent protection are assessed according to legally established criteria and submitted to the Kosovo Council for Cultural Heritage (KCCH) for review.

Under Article 4 of the law, the Council reviews proposed assets and determines whether they should be included in the list of cultural heritage under permanent protection. The decision is subsequently signed by the responsible minister, at which point permanent protection enters into force. The law further provides the list is open to the public.

The law also requires protected assets to be registered with the Kosovo cadastral and geodetic authorities and provides publication of their inclusion in the Official Gazette.

== Categories ==
Kosovo's cultural heritage legislation recognizes several principal categories.

=== Architectural heritage ===
Architectural heritage forms part of Kosovo's immovable cultural heritage. It includes monuments, ensembles or groups of buildings and architectural conservation areas.

The legislation provides specific protection for architectural monuments and their constituent elements. Architectural heritage under temporary or permanent protection is subject to a protected zone, while interventions affecting it's integrity or values generally require written approval from the competent institution.

=== Archaeological heritage ===
Archaeological heritage includes immovable and movable archaeological remains, including monuments, settlements, structures and stratigraphic compositions.

Archaeological sites may be subject to special protective and preventive measures.

=== Cultural landscapes ===
The Cultural Heritage Law defines cultural landscapes as areas whose character results from the interaction of natural and/or human factors and which form part of the cultural and natural heritage of communities.

Cultural landscapes may therefore be included among assets receiving permanent protection.

=== Movable heritage ===
Movable cultural heritage consists of objects distinguished by historical, archaeological, artistic, scientific, spiritual or other cultural values.

=== Spiritual heritage ===
Spiritual cultural heritage includes forms of cultural expression associated with traditions and customs, including language, festivals, rites, dances, music, songs and artistic expression.

== Designation procedure ==
The procedure for permanent protection begins with identification, inventory and documentation of cultural heritage assets. The competent institutions assess the values of an asset and determine whether it meets the criteria for protection.

Assets proposed for permanent protection are submitted to the Kosovo Council for Cultural Heritage (KCCH). The council may review, adapt, approve or reject proposals in accordance with the applicable legislation. Following the council's decision, the responsible minister signs the decision placing the asset on the list of cultural heritage under permanent protection. The permanent-protection status then enters into force.

The current procedure is further regulated by Regulation No. 02/2024 on the Assessment and Designation of Cultural Heritage under Permanent Protection adopted by the Kosovo Council for Cultural Heritage (KCCH) and published on 26 July 2024.

== Protection measures ==
Permanent-protection status places legal restrictions on interventions that could damage the cultural values or integrity of a protected asset. The Cultural Heritage Law requires written authorization for interventions affecting protected heritage and allows competent institutions to order the suspension of unauthorized works.

Conservation and restoration projects must receive written approval from the competent institution and are carried out under institutional supervision. Conservation and restoration activities are generally undertaken by competent institutions or by individuals and legal entities licensed by the responsible ministry. Owners, possessors and users of protected cultural heritage are required to take care of its protection. The law also provides mechanisms for state intervention where a protected asset is at risk of deliberate damage or destruction or where an owner or possessor fails to adequately protect it.

The law provides financial and fiscal measures for protected cultural heritage, including funding from the Kosovo budget and other domestic and international sources. Cultural heritage under temporary or permanent protection is also exempt from property tax under the conditions established by the law.

== List of protected assets ==
The Ministry of Culture and Tourism publishes official lists of cultural heritage under permanent protection through the Official Gazette of the Republic of Kosovo (OGRK). The Official Gazette lists permanent-protection lists among the ministry's published acts, including lists published in May and August 2025.

The list includes assets from different regions of Kosovo and includes architectural monuments, archaeological sites, ensembles and cultural landscapes.

Key
^{*}	Sites in the Special Protected Area status.
**Bold**	Law on the Historic Center of Prizren.

=== Monument/Ensemble ===
Number in the Register.	Image	Monument	Period	District	Municipality/City	Status / Protection	Unique number	Reference
1		Our Lady of Ljeviš*	Late Antiquity, Middle Ages	Prizren	Prizren	69/2016 (LSPZ)	1974	
2		Monastery of Deçan*	Middle Ages	Peja	Deçan	69/2016 (LSPZ)	3106	
3		Monastery of Graçanica*	Middle Ages	Prishtina	Graçanicë	69/2016 (LSPZ)	390	

=== Archaeological Site/Reservation ===
Number in the Register.	Image	Monument	Period	District	Municipality/City	Status / Protection	Unique number	Reference
4		Castle "Old tower"	Middle Ages	Mitrovica	Vushtrri	69/2016	2852	
5		Harilaq Castle	Eneolit, Bronze Age, The Iron Age, Late Antiquity	Prishtina	Fushë Kosovë	69/2016	707	
6		Municipum Ulpiana- Justiniana Secunda	Prehistory, Roman, Late Antiquity	Prishtina	Graçanicë	69/2016	2120	
7		Archaeological site "Qyteza"	Roman	Peja	Klinë	69/2016	3029	
8		Prizren Castle	Late Bronze Age, Late Antiquity, Middle Ages until 1912	Prizren	Prizren	69/2016	1967	
9		Archaeological site "Great Field and Mound"	Prehistory / Iron Age	Gjilan	Viti	69/2016	2750	
10		The fortified town in Veleç – Shashkoc	Late Antiquity, Middle Ages	Prishtina	Prishtina	69/2016	3095	
11		Korisha Castle	Bronze Age, Hellenistic, Late Antiquity, Middle Ages	Prizren	Prizren	69/2016	2946	
12		Castle of Late Antiquity in Keqekollë	Late Antiquity	Prishtina	Prishtina	69/2016	3682	
13		Archaeological site "Vendenis"	Roman, Late Antiquity	Prishtina	Podujevë	124/2023	2121	
14		Ruins of the Latin/Catholic Saxon Church "Saint Peter"	Middle Ages	Mitrovica	Leposavić	200/2023	6	
15		Illyrian Tomb in Gjinoc	Prehistory	Prizren	Suharekë	35/2024	3436	
16		Tuma in Shpenadi	7th–1st century BC	Prizren	Prizren	35/2024	4829	
17		Late Antiquity Castle in Topanicë	Late Antiquity	Gjilan	Kamenicë	35/2024	1197	
18		Multilayer Site in Hisar	Prehistory	Prizren	Suharekë	35/2024	2996	

=== Architectural Heritage: Monument/Ensemble ===
Number in the Register.	Image	Monument	Period	District	Municipality/City	Status / Protection	Unique number	Reference
19		Patriarchate of Peja Monastery*	Middle Ages	Peja	Peja	69/2016 (LSPZ)	2087	
20		Haxhi Zeka Tower	19th century	Peja	Peja	69/2016	597	
21		Mansion of Tahir Bey	19th century	Peja	Peja	124/2023	964	
22		Mansion of Kasapolleve	19th century	Peja	Peja	124/2023	963	
23		Bajrakli Mosque	15th century	Peja	Peja	200/2023	354	
24		Kulla of Ali Gecit	18th century	Peja	Deçan	200/2023	2055	
25		Hadum Mosque	16th century	Gjakova	Gjakova	69/2016	602	
26		Kulla of Hysni Koshi	19th century	Gjakova	Gjakova	200/2023	2706	
27		Kulla of Astrit Kryeziu	19th century	Gjakova	Gjakova	200/2023	819	
28		Catholic Church of Saint Anton	19th century	Gjakova	Gjakova	200/2023	638	
29		Traditional House of Mazllom Zherka	19th century	Gjakova	Gjakova	200/2023	976	
30		Sinan Pasha Mosque	Middle Ages	Prizren	Prizren	69/2016	337	
31		Hydroelectric Power Plant – Museum of Hydroelectricity	1926–1928	Prizren	Prizren	69/2016	1425	
32		Gazi Mehmet Pasha Hammam	1573–1574	Prizren	Prizren	69/2016	437	
33		Lumbardhi Cinema	20th century	Prizren	Prizren	124/2023	4131	
34		Kerek Mosque – Namazxhah	1455	Prizren	Prizren	124/2023	345	
35		Residential Complex of the Hadro Family	19th century	Prizren	Prizren	124/2023	4506	
36		Clock Tower	18th century	Gjakovë	Rahovec	124/2023	1768	
37		House of Musa Shehzade	19th century	Prizren	Prizren	200/2023	559	
38		Monumental Complex of the Albanian League of Prizren	19th century	Prizren	Prizren	200/2023	438	
39		Catholic Cathedral of Our Lady of Perpetual Succour	19th–20th century	Prizren	Prizren	200/2023	468	
40		Fountain of Binbash	19th century	Prizren	Prizren	200/2023	427	
41		House Museum of Ukshin Hoti	20th century	Gjakovë	Rahovec	200/2023	4308	
42		Clock Tower – Archaeological Museum	19th century	Prizren	Prizren	35/2024	438	
43		House of the Pomaku Family	20th century	Prizren	Prizren	35/2024	506	
44		Stone Fountain Beledije	19th century	Prizren	Prizren	35/2024	426	
45		House of Adem Aga Gjon	19th century	Prizren	Prizren	35/2024	476	
46		House of Ismet Sokoli	19th century	Prizren	Prizren	35/2024	3406	
47		Building of the Old Municipality	19th century	Prizren	Prizren	35/2024	628	
48		Building Ensemble "Saraji i Vjetër"	19th–20th century	Prizren	Prizren	35/2024	4762	
49		[Kulla e Pjetër Prenk Palajt Kulla of Pjetër Prenk Palaj]	19th century	Prizren	Prizren	99/2024	1365	
50		Village Old School - Mushnikovë	20th century	Prizren	Prizren	99/2024	4756	
51		Ruins of a Religious Facility – Buzez (Namazxhah)	16th century	Prizren	Dragash	99/2024	2945	
52		Complex of the Mehmed Pasha Mosque	16th century	Prizren	Prizren	99/2024	351	
53		The King's Mosque	1461	Prishtina	Prishtinë	69/2016	3633	
54		Residence (Former Academy of Sciences and Arts)	XIX century	Prishtina	Prishtinë	69/2016	2871	
55		Residence (JPMK)	XIX century	Prishtina	Prishtinë	69/2016	3084	
56		Residential complex (Emin Gjiku) Ethnological Museum	XVIII–XIX century	Prishtina	Prishtinë	69/2016	3087	
57		The Great Hammam	XIV–XV Century	Prishtina	Prishtinë	215/2022	2776	
58		Jewish cemetery in Taukbashqe	XIX–XX Century	Prishtina	Prishtinë	215/2022	3400	
59		National Library of Kosovo "Pjetër Bogdani"	XX Century	Prishtina	Prishtinë	124/2023	3639	
60		Library "Hivzi Sylejmani"	XX Century	Prishtina	Prishtinë	124/2023	3400	
61		Clock tower	XIX Century	Prishtina	Prishtinë	124/2023	2963	
62		Museum of Kosovo	XX Century	Prishtina	Prishtinë	124/2023	2764	
63		Residential house (Hynilereve)	XIX Century	Prishtina	Prishtinë	124/2023	2959	
64		Bazaar Mosque	XIX Century	Prishtina	Prishtinë	124/2023	2962	
65		Mosque of Jashar Pasha	XVI Century	Prishtina	Prishtinë	124/2023	2782	
66		First Albanian School	XIX Century	Prishtina	Prishtinë	99/2024	3194	
67		Residence House – Musli Hoxha	1927	Prishtina	Prishtinë	99/2024	2710	
68		Kulla of Pashë Karadaku – Janjeva	XIX Century	Prishtina	Lipjan	99/2024	43	
69		Former Hotel "Jadran"	XX Century	Mitrovica	Mitrovica	215/2022	457	
70		Building of Old Hammam	XVI Century	Mitrovica	Vushtrri	124/2023	2850	
71		Adem Jashari Memorial Complex*	XX Century	Mitrovica	Skenderaj	124/2023 (Special area of state and national interest)	3494	
72		Complex of Isa Boletini's kulla*	XIX Century	Mitrovica	Zveçan	124/2023 (LSPZ)	5	
73		Residence House – Xhafer Deva – former Infirmary	1930	Mitrovica	Mitrovica	200/2023	453	
74		Building of Old Hammam	XVIII Century	Mitrovica	Mitrovica	200/2023	2	
75		Mosque of Mazhiq	XVI Century	Mitrovica	Zveçan	200/2023	4	
76		Kulla of Rexhe Gashi	XIX Century	Mitrovica	Skenderaj	200/2023	2573	
77		Atik Mosque	XVII Century	Gjilan	Gjilan	215/2022	66	
78		High School of Music, Gjilan	1887	Gjilan	Gjilan	215/2022	168	
79		Church and elementary school in the Albanian language	XIX Century	Gjilan	Viti	69/2016	2741	
80		Muhamer Shabani's house	1880	Gjilan	Gjilan	124/2023	823	
81		The House of Zekirja Abdullahu	1906	Gjilan	Gjilan	200/2023	183	
82		Building of Kaymakam (Deputy Governor's Building)	XVIII century	Gjilan	Gjilan	200/2023	319	
83		Building of former Turkish Military Storehouse	XVIII century	Gjilan	Gjilan	200/2023	320	
84		Church of Saint Ana in Dunav	1938	Gjilan	Gjilan	200/2023	180	
85		Teke of Sheh Zenel Abedinit	XVIII century	Gjilan	Kamenica	200/2023	2690	
86		The House of Haxhi Ahmeti	XIX century	Gjilan	Viti	200/2023	2685	
87		Church of Transfiguration in Pasjan	1861	Gjilan	Partesh	200/2023	324	
88		Minaret of Cernica Mosque	1775–2006	Gjilan	Cernica	99/2024	96	
89		Mill of Ndue Sopi	XIX century	Gjilan	Viti	99/2024	595	
90		Mosque in Meshina	1886	Gjilan	Kamenica	99/2024	245	
91		Complex of buildings: Mosque and Orthodox Church	XX century	Ferizaj	Ferizaj	200/2023	3472	
92		Mosque of Sinan Pasha	1594–1595	Ferizaj	Kaçanik	200/2023	3172	

=== Architectural Heritage: Fields of architectural conservation ===
Number in the Register.	Image	Monument	Period	District	Municipality/City	Status / Protection	Unique number	Reference
93		**Historic Centre of Prizren***		Prizren	Prizren	Law on the Historic Center of Prizren	4804	

== Institutional responsibility ==
The Kosovo Council for Cultural Heritage (KCCH) is the principal independent body responsible for evaluating cultural heritage assets proposed for permanent protection. Under the Cultural Heritage Law, the Council is established by the Assembly of the Republic of Kosovo and consists of seven members appointed for three-year terms.

The Council reviews proposed cultural heritage assets, evaluates projects and identifies necessary financial-support measures for cultural heritage. It also cooperates with competent institutions responsible for research, conservation, restoration, administration and promotion.

The responsible ministry oversees the implementation of cultural heritage policy and signs the decisions placing assets on the permanent-protection list.

== See also ==
- Cultural heritage in Kosovo
- Monuments of Kosovo
- Immovable Cultural Heritage of Exceptional Importance (Serbia)
- Immovable Cultural Heritage of Great Importance (Serbia)
- Destruction of Albanian heritage in Kosovo
- Destruction of Serbian heritage in Kosovo
- Culture of Kosovo
- List of World Heritage Sites in Kosovo
