= Chiharu Shiota =

Japanese artist (born 1972)

- 塩田 千春
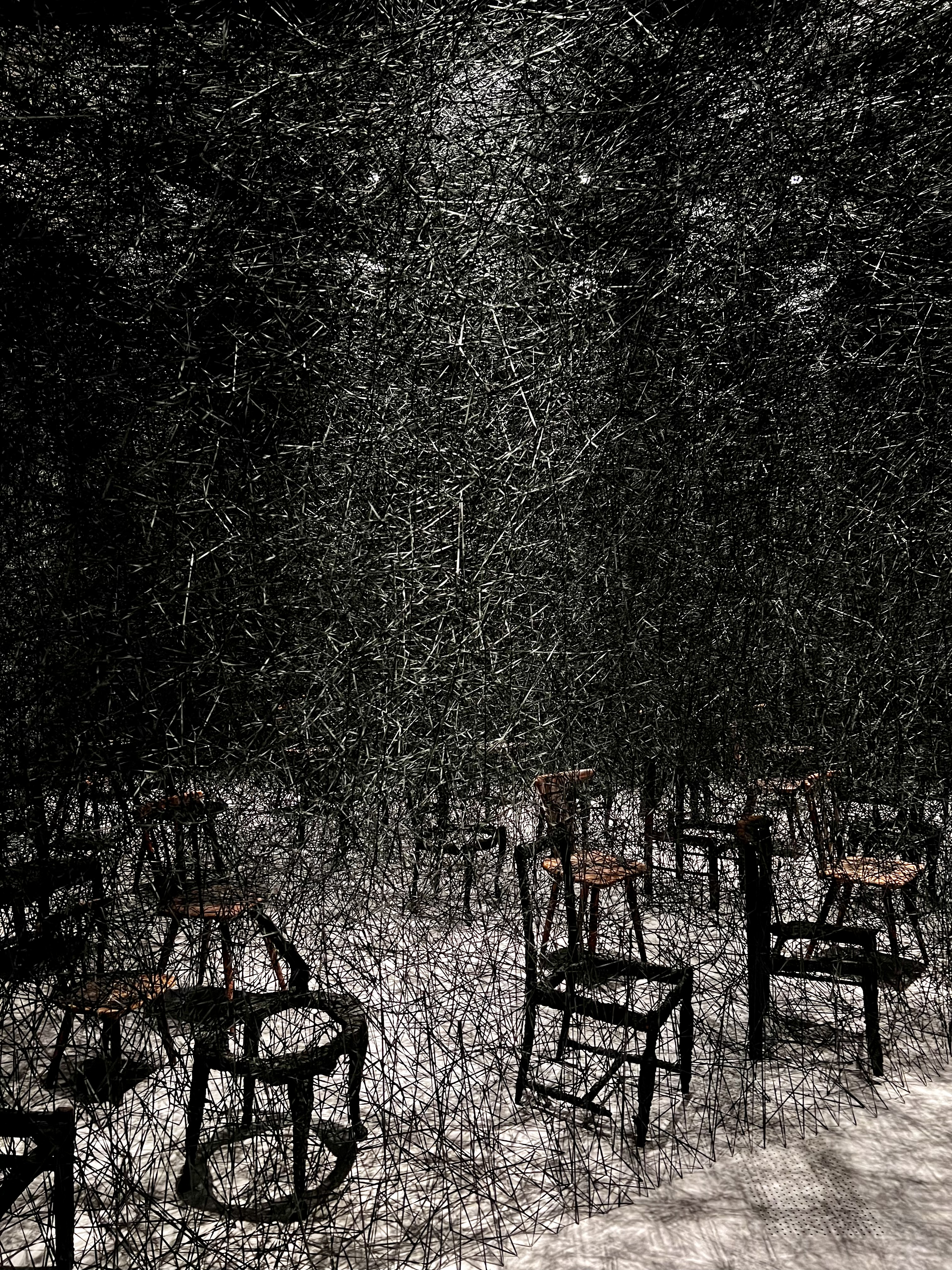
- In Silence (2002/2022) from The Soul Trembles exhibition at QAGOMA, 2022
- Born: 1972 (age 53–54); Osaka, Japan
- Education: Kyoto Seika University, Braunschweig University of Art, Berlin University of the Arts
- Known for: Installation art, performance art
- Website: chiharu-shiota.com

Chiharu Shiota (塩田 千春, Shiota Chiharu) (born 1972) is a Japanese performance and installation artist. Shiota has lived and worked in Berlin, Germany since 1996. Educated in Japan, Australia, and Germany, Shiota interweaves materiality and the psychic perception of the space to explore ideas around the body and flesh, personal narratives that engage with memory, territory, and alienation.

Shiota has exhibited worldwide. She made her debut in Japan at the Yokohama Triennale in 2001 with Memory of Skin and represented Japan in the 56th Venice Biennale in 2015.

== Early life, education and teaching ==
Shiota was born in Osaka. Her parents ran a business manufacturing fish boxes, producing a thousand wooden boxes a day. Although her parents didn't directly support her desire to be an artist, they allowed her to formally study art.

She studied at the Kyoto Seika University in Kyoto from 1992 to 1996, was an exchange student at Canberra School of Art, Australian National University, 1993 and a student at Hochschule für Bildende Künste, Braunschweig, from 1997 to 1999 and at Universität der Künste, Berlin, from 1999 to 2002 and was Artist in Residence at Akademie Schloss Solitude, Stuttgart, Germany. In an interview with Andrea Jahn, Shiota mentions that her first installation work was Becoming Painting (1994), which took place while she was studying abroad in Canberra, Australia, was created with red enamel paint she used on her body. "Taking part in Becoming Painting was indeed an act of liberation. It was my first physical piece of work, using my whole body, rather than a skilful artwork."

Shiota first studied under contemporary sculptor Saburo Muraoka while at Kyoto Seika University. In Berlin, she was a student of Rebecca Horn and in Braunschweig studied with Marina Abramović, who became an important influence on her work.

== Work ==
Shiota's oeuvre links various aspects of art performances, sculpture and installation practices. Mostly renowned for her vast, room-spanning webs of threads or hoses, she links abstract networks with concrete everyday objects such as keys, window frames, dresses, shoes, boats and suitcases. Her early works are performance pieces, many of which were recorded in photographs and video, in which, for example, she uses mud, while later large-scale installations integrate personal objects (e.g. shoes) given to her by other people.

In the early works of Shiota while at Seika University in Kyoto, including From DNA to DNA (1994) and Becoming Painting (1994), elements like woollen threads and paint set an elemental foundation for her future creation. Materials and colours carry particular meanings in her artistic work, which menstruation blood is used as artistic material and red threads come to signify human relationships. Thin plastic tubing filled with blood-like liquid is also occasionally used to suggest the umbilical support of a body, symbolizing nurturing and the beginning of a new life.

Shiota acknowledges her teacher Marina Abramovic's influence during her formative years and refers to Christian Boltanski's work as a source of inspiration for some of her later installation works. Places matter to her work and she is strongly interested in psychogeography, the relationship between psyche and space. Shiota's thread installation works developed from the artist's experience of moving between places out of which evolved the desire to cover her possessions in yarn thereby marking a personal territory. In an interview she states that she could not have made her large-scale installations, A Room of Memory (2009) and Memory of Skin (2005), without living in Berlin. She has also created work in collaboration with choreographers and composers such as Toshio Hosokawa, Sasha Waltz and Stefan Goldmann.

=== Boundary and dwelling: House of Windows (2005) ===
Arriving in Berlin in 1999, Shiota witnessed a Berlin with lingering Cold War ideological and cultural relics at the turn of the millennium. With the political tension gradually weakening, Berlin had transformed itself into a major economic and commercial center. Although equally fascinated by the forward-moving scenes and the renewal of the urban landscape, Shiota turned to look at the historic, abandoned part of the city. Over several years, the artist collected hundreds of old windows from construction sites in former East Berlin out of her curiosity of how residents from the two sides viewed each other's way of life. House of Windows (2005), shown at Shiota's solo exhibition Raum at Haus am Lützowplatz in Berlin and later at the 3rd Fukuoka Asian Art Triennale at the Fukuoka Asian Art Museum in Japan, presents a delicate assemblage of approximately two hundred disposed windows in the shape of a house.

Equating windows as skin that divides the flesh and the outer world, Shiota explores the physical boundaries that stood in the fast-changing urban realm and draws a parallel between that and the body and therefore, interpersonal boundaries. Personally, as still a new transplant to Berlin, Shiota moved frequently from one place to another and dislocation has become an inherent part of her life. Thus, through the creation of works such as House of Windows, Shiota probes into the in-betweenness as she was feeling culturally and artistically distant to both her home country and current place of residence. Standing as an extremely fragile dwelling, House of Windows evokes the liminal boundaries between the personal and the historical through visual narratives embedded in used objects.

=== Cobweb installations ===
Since the 2000s, Shiota continues to produce cobweb-like installations at institutions worldwide, which became her signature set of works. These installations vary significantly from one to another, fitting the scale of the gallery rooms and incorporating found objects of various kinds. In creating the work at each exhibiting venue, Shiota often engages with the symbolism and stories contained in used objects that she was able to collect. The objects range from beds (Breathing from Earth (2000), During Sleep (2000/2005), One Place (2001), Traces of Memory (2013), Sleeping is like death (2016)), to dresses (After the Dream (2011), Labyrinth of Memory (2012)), to shoes (DNA (2004), Over the Continents (2008), Traces of Life (2008)), to keys (The Key in the Hand (2015)) and chairs Infinity Lines (2017). Dresses indicate a second skin, a divide between the self and the world. The curved contours of keys resemble those of the human body. The bodily contact that all of these above objects carries constitutes numerous lived experiences that intrigues the artist. In Shiota's constructions, the red or black strings stretches from, reaches, surrounds, connects, encloses, and obscures the collected objects in varying ways. At each installation, Shiota and her assistants would spend hours straight in completing the work. The artist views the crisscrossing threads as human relationships that would get tangled, cut, loosened or charged with tension, and these experiences are constantly present in the creation processes of the artist, which adds a layer of performative nature to Shiota's work that is often unseen to the audience.

=== Women’s experiences, Dialogue with Absence (2010) ===
In the recent decade, Shiota has created large-scale installations that evoke the lived experiences of women. In Dialogue with Absence (2010), an oversized white wedding dress is hung high up on the wall. On the ground lays several peristaltic pumps, from where red liquid depart and reach the dress via numerous plastic tubes attached onto the dress. This part-medical, part-ghostly scene poses questions about womanhood. The dress seems to embody an ideal version of a married woman, who is drained by societal burdens. The injection of the blood could also suggest that societal expectations are fed to her continuously. A disturbing, nightmare-like composition, Dialogue may also be autobiographical, pointing to the artist's own battling with cancer.

=== Great Hammam of Pristina, Manifesta 14 ===
In an attempt to use neglected sites in Pristina as art exhibition spaces for Manifesta 14, Shiota hung hundreds of red yarn threads from the Great Hammam’s ceiling. The venue counted over 150,000 visitors.

== Community projects ==
Besides art creation, Shiota has taken part in realising community-based projects outside her place of residence. Further Memory (2010) is a tunnel-like structure she has built in Teshima Island, Japan for the Setouchi International Art Festival. The medium of 600 used local windows is reminiscent of Shiota's House of Windows (2005), with unique memories attached to its frames and glasses. With the end of the tunnel facing the farmed rice field and ocean, it shows an appreciation for the ecological beauty and the islanders' connection with the environment, rendering a sense of hope and openness in spite of its depopulation over decades.

== Selected exhibitions (2010–2025) ==
- 2010 :
  - Dialogue with Absence, Galerie Christophe Gaillard, Paris Wall, Kenji Taki Gallery, Nagoya, Japan
- 2015 :
  - The Key in the Hand, Japanese Pavilion, Biennale di Venezia, Venice, Italy
- 2022 :
  - The Soul Trembles, Gallery of Modern Art, Brisbane, Queensland, Australia
- 2024 :
  - The Unsettled Soul, Kunsthalle Praha, Prague
  - Between Worlds, Istanbul Modern, Istanbul
- 2024–2025:
  - The Soul Trembles, Grand Palais, Paris
- 17 February – 3 May 2026:
  - Chiharu Shiota: Threads of Life, Southbank Centre, London
- 26 September 2026 – 14 February 2027:
  - The Soul Trembles, Montreal Museum of Fine Arts, Montreal
