= Jadran Hotel (Mitrovica) =

- Ndërtesa ish hoteli "Jadran-Adriatiku" (Mitrovicë) (Albanian)
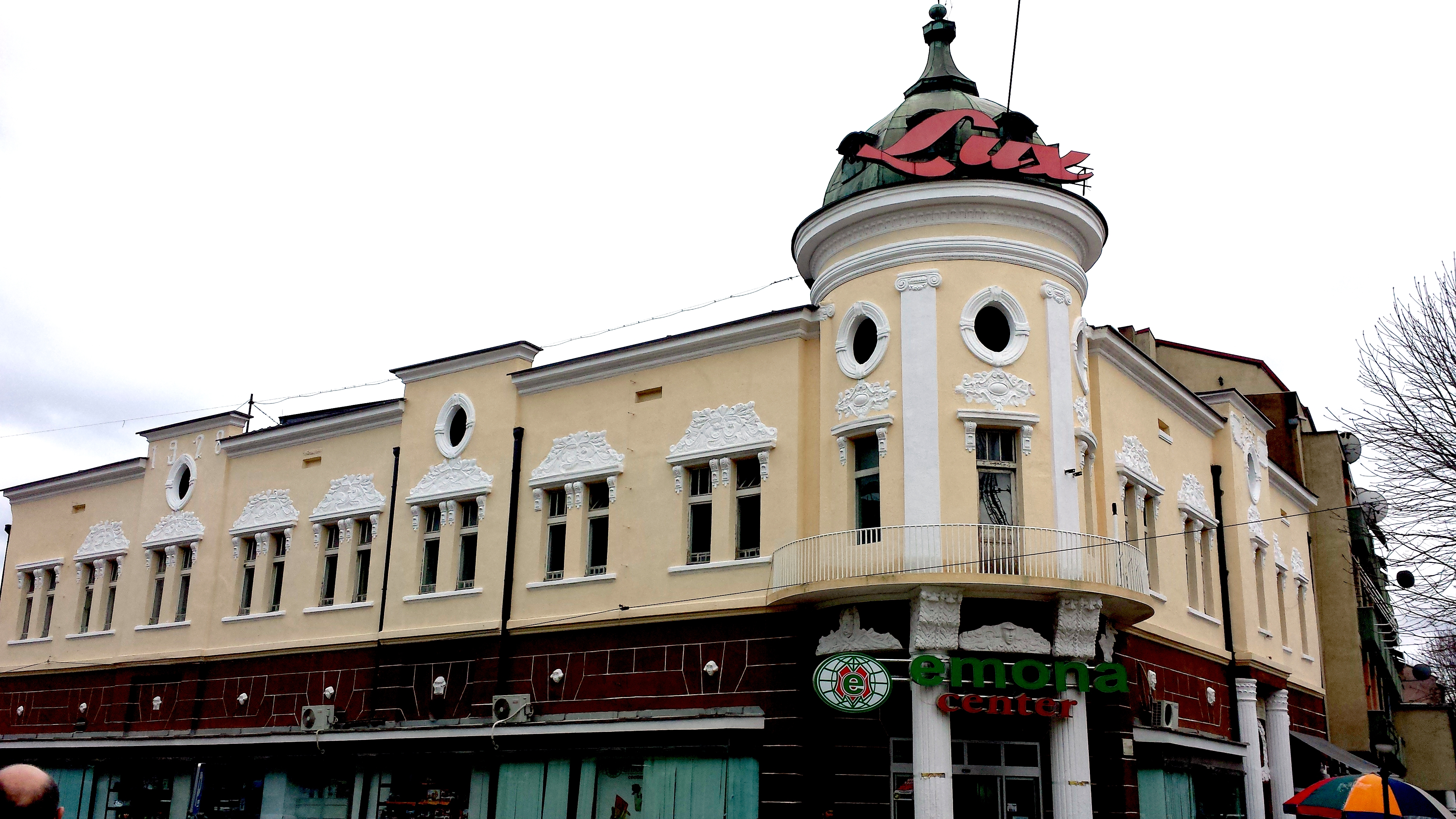
- Interactive map of Jadran Hotel (Mitrovica)
- 42°53′20.8″N 20°52′10.3″E
- Location: Mitrovica, Kosovo

History
- Built: 19th century

Cultural Heritage under Permanent Protection
- Official name: Ish Hotel "Jadran"
- Type: Architectural Heritage: Monument/Ensemble
- Criteria: Under Protection
- Part of: 2079/2011
- Reference no.: 457

The Jadran Adriatic Hotel (Mitrovica) is a cultural heritage monument in Mitrovica, Kosovo.

== History and description ==
Jadran Adriatic Hotel is in the center of Mitrovica overlooking Adem Jashari Square. It was built in 1928 with funding from the wealthy local Žarković family. Eventually, it was repurposed as an administrative building for N.T. LUX and later as a city library. Today it is privately owned and the ground floor is leased as office space.

== Architecture ==
Built in the Vienna Secession style of Art Nouveau architecture, the L-shaped building includes a basement, mezzanine, and first floor. The central façade includes an archway under the dome where the two wings meet, crowning the two pillars and arched balcony that mark the entrance facing the square. The basement was designed for hotel bookkeeping, the ground floor for maintenance and reception, and the first floor for lodging. The roof is mostly clay tile with some laminated copper on the entry dome and a few other areas. Most renovations have been on the ground floor façade, mainly the number and shape of the windows, and the building remains in relatively good condition. The Adriatic closely resembles the Union Hotel in Pristina, built in 1927.

== Gallery ==
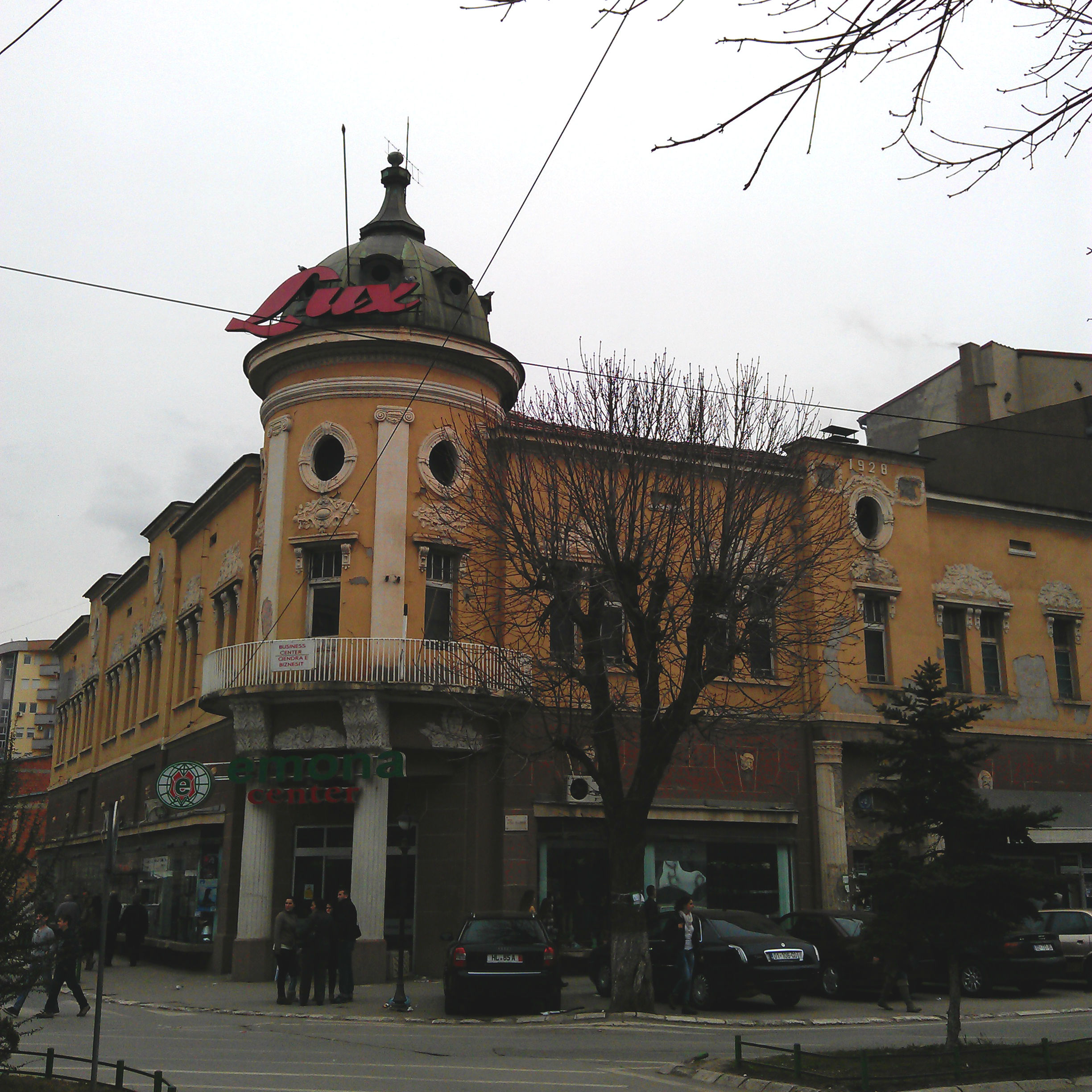

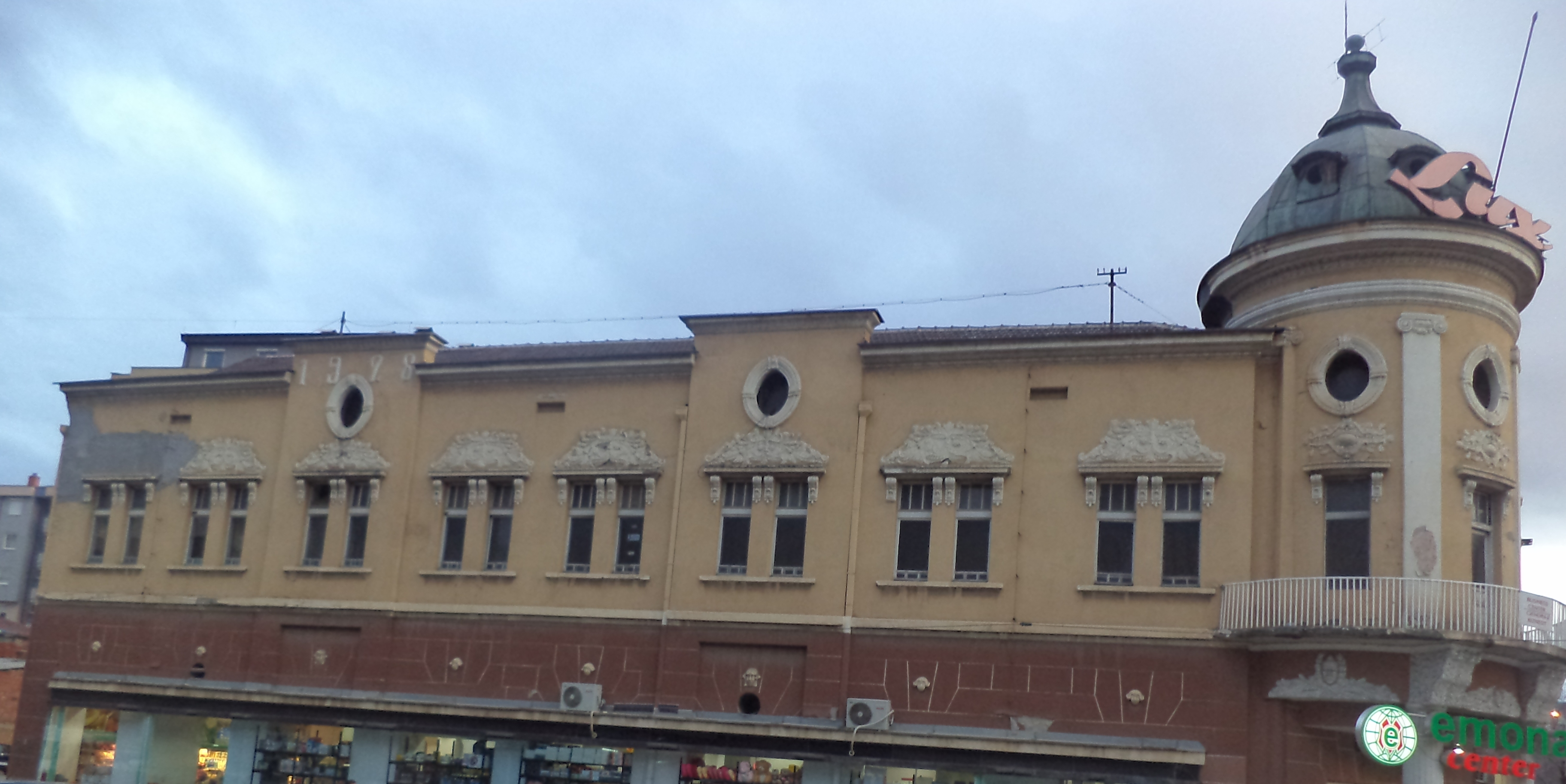

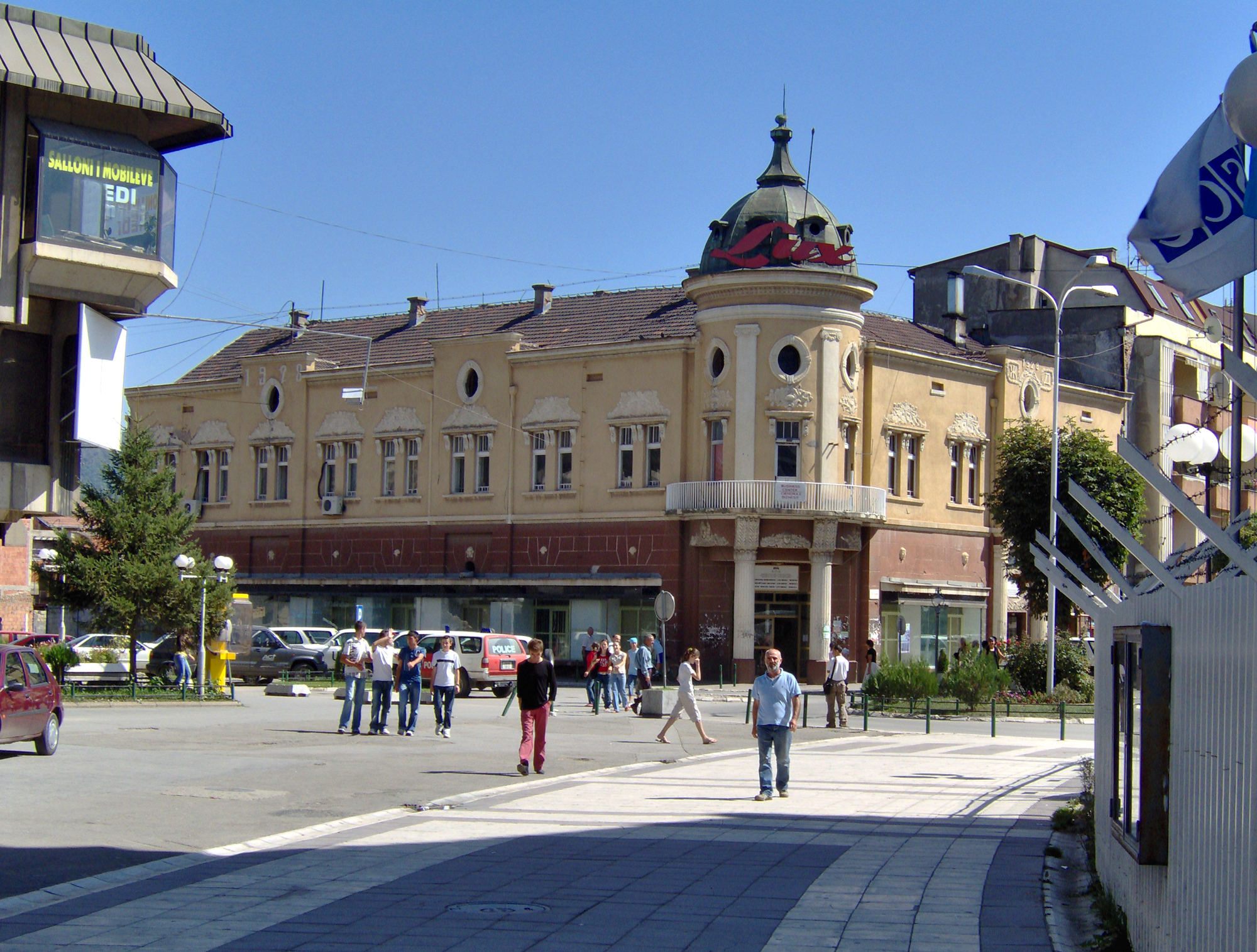

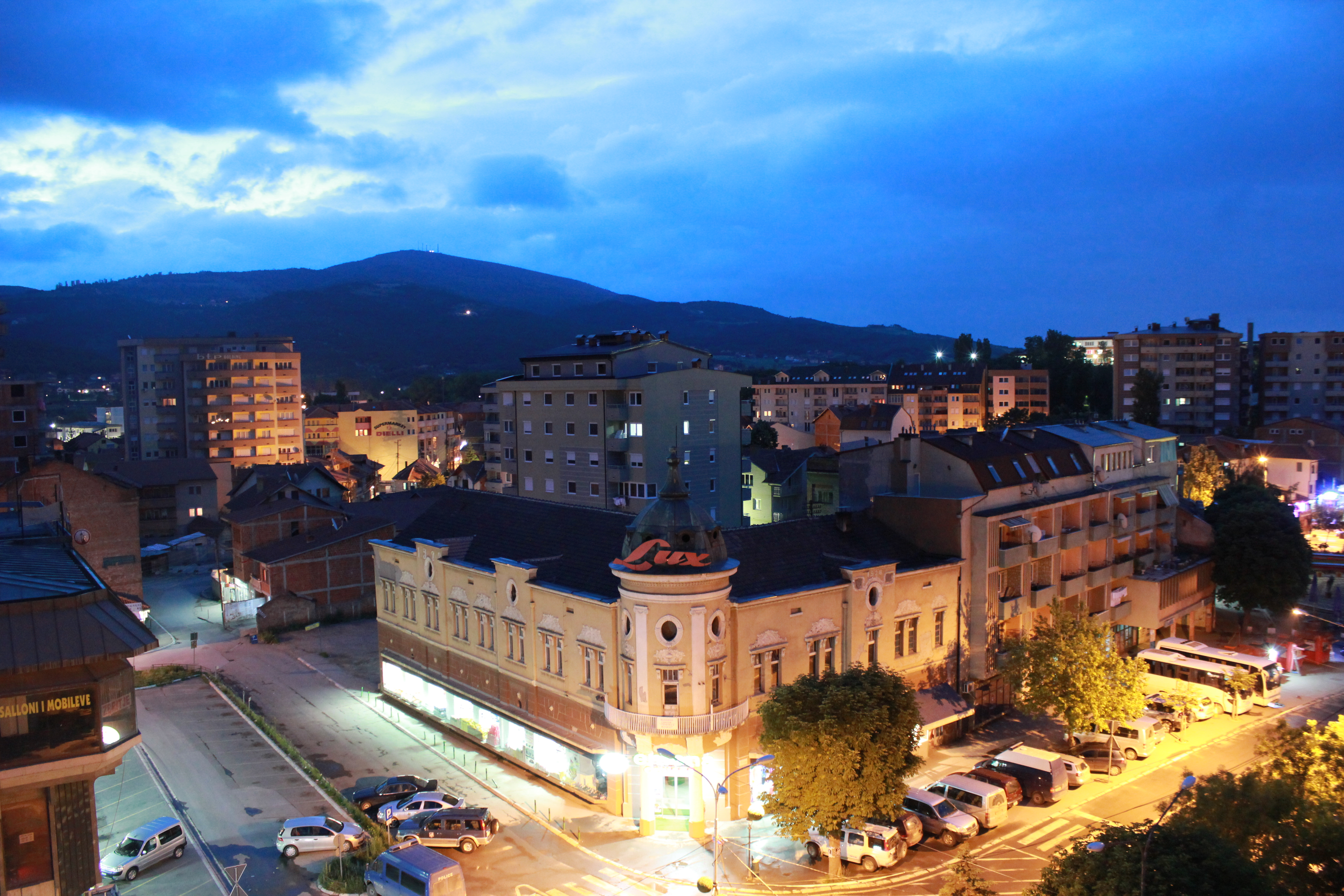
