= King Mosque, Pristina =

Ottoman-era mosque in Pristina, Kosovo

Imperial Mosque Xhamia e Mbretit
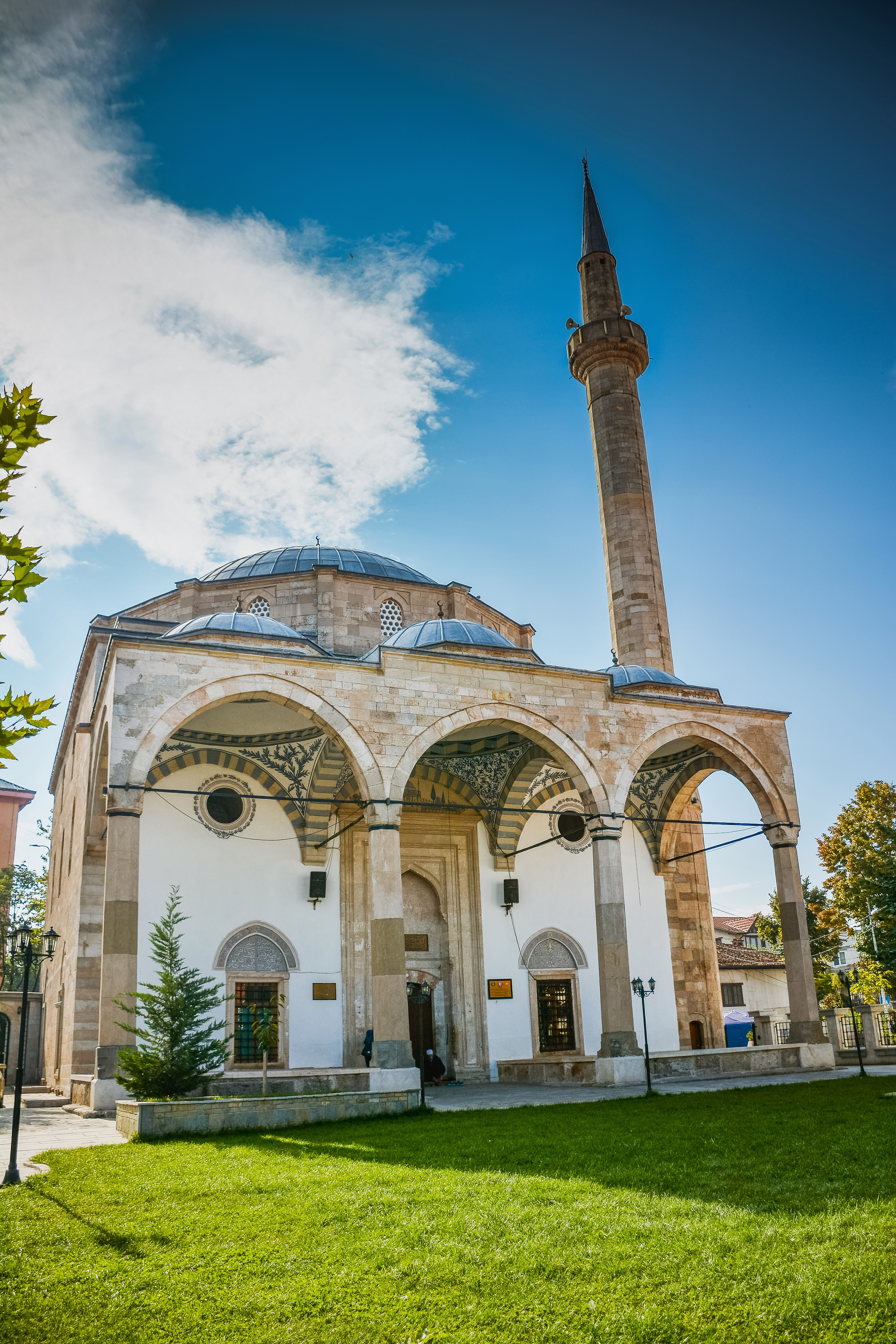

Religion
- Affiliation: Sunni Islam
- Ecclesiastical or organisational status: Open
- Status: Preserved

Location
- Location: Pristina
- Country: Kosovo
- Interactive map of Imperial Mosque; Xhamia e Mbretit
- Coordinates: 42.6670°N 21.1670°E

Architecture
- Type: Ottoman architecture
- Completed: 1461; 565 years ago
- Materials: Stone

Cultural Heritage under Permanent Protection
- Official name: Xhamia e Mbretit
- Type: Architectural Heritage: Monument/Ensemble
- Reference no.: 3633

The Imperial Mosque, also known as King's Mosque, (Note: Albanian: Xhamia e Mbretit;Serbian: Carska džamija u Prištini) is an Ottoman mosque located in Pristina, Kosovo. It was built in 1461 by Sultan Mehmed the Conqueror. The inscription written in Arabic alphabet in six rows which is situated in the entry portal as the exact date of construction provides the year 1461, according to the Gregorian calendar, i.e. Hijra 865 year according to the Islamic calendar.

Based on the monument, structure, construction way and decorative elements it ranks among the most important buildings of Islamic architecture in Eastern Europe.

== History ==
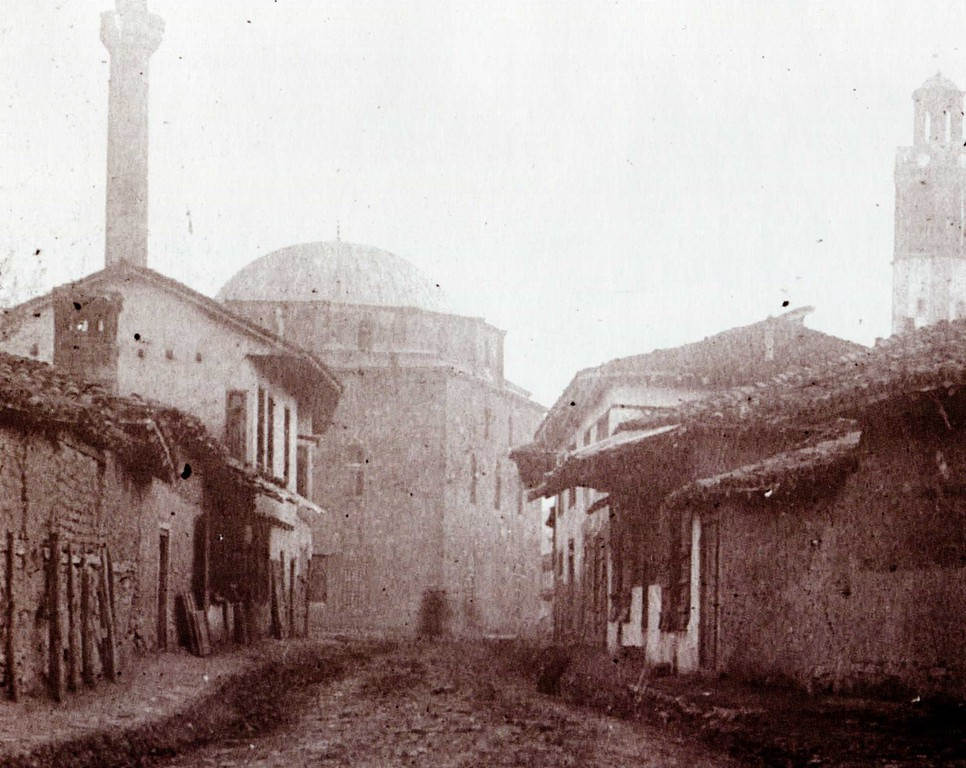
Imperial Mosque between 1876-1900

The mosque was built as a dominating building on the landscape of Prishtina. During the Austro-Turkish wars, at the end of the 17th century, it was temporarily turned into a Catholic church. One of the most prominent Albanian writers, Pjetër Bogdani, also an active leader of the pro-Austrian rebels, was buried here. After the Ottomans regained control, in 1690, the bones of Pjetër Bogdani were exhumed and thrown into the street by the Ottoman soldiers.

It underwent restoration between 1682-83 during the reign of Sultan Mehmed IV, and centuries later following the 1955 earthquake. The monument was declared to be under state protection by the Provincial Office for the Protection of Monuments in 1953 as it was in poor condition. Partial conservation efforts were conducted between 1955 and 1990. In 2004, further restoration studies and plans were prepared by a specialized team from Turkey which were approved by the cultural heritage authorities of Kosovo and Turkey in 2006.

== Gallery ==
Photos of the Imperial Mosque
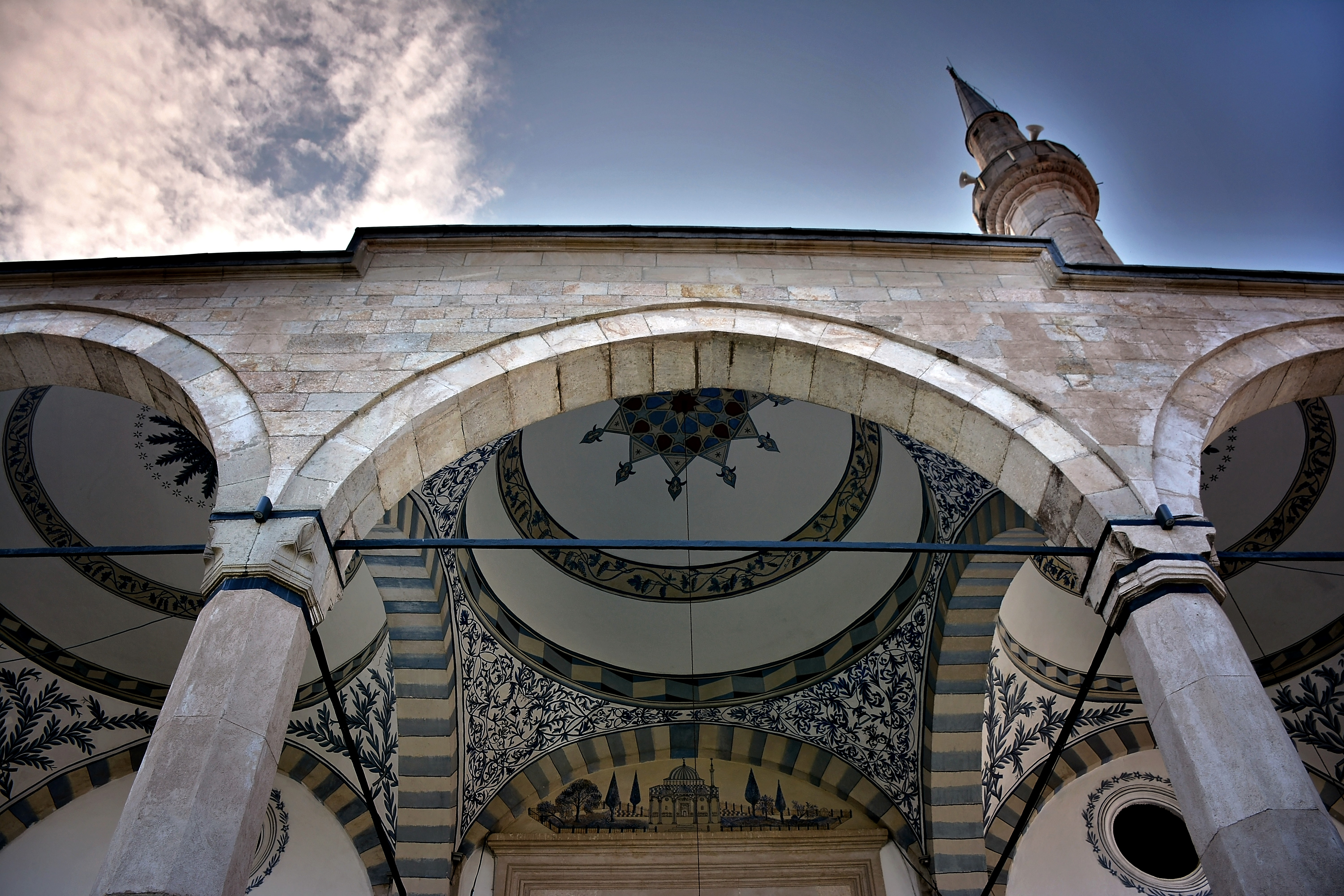
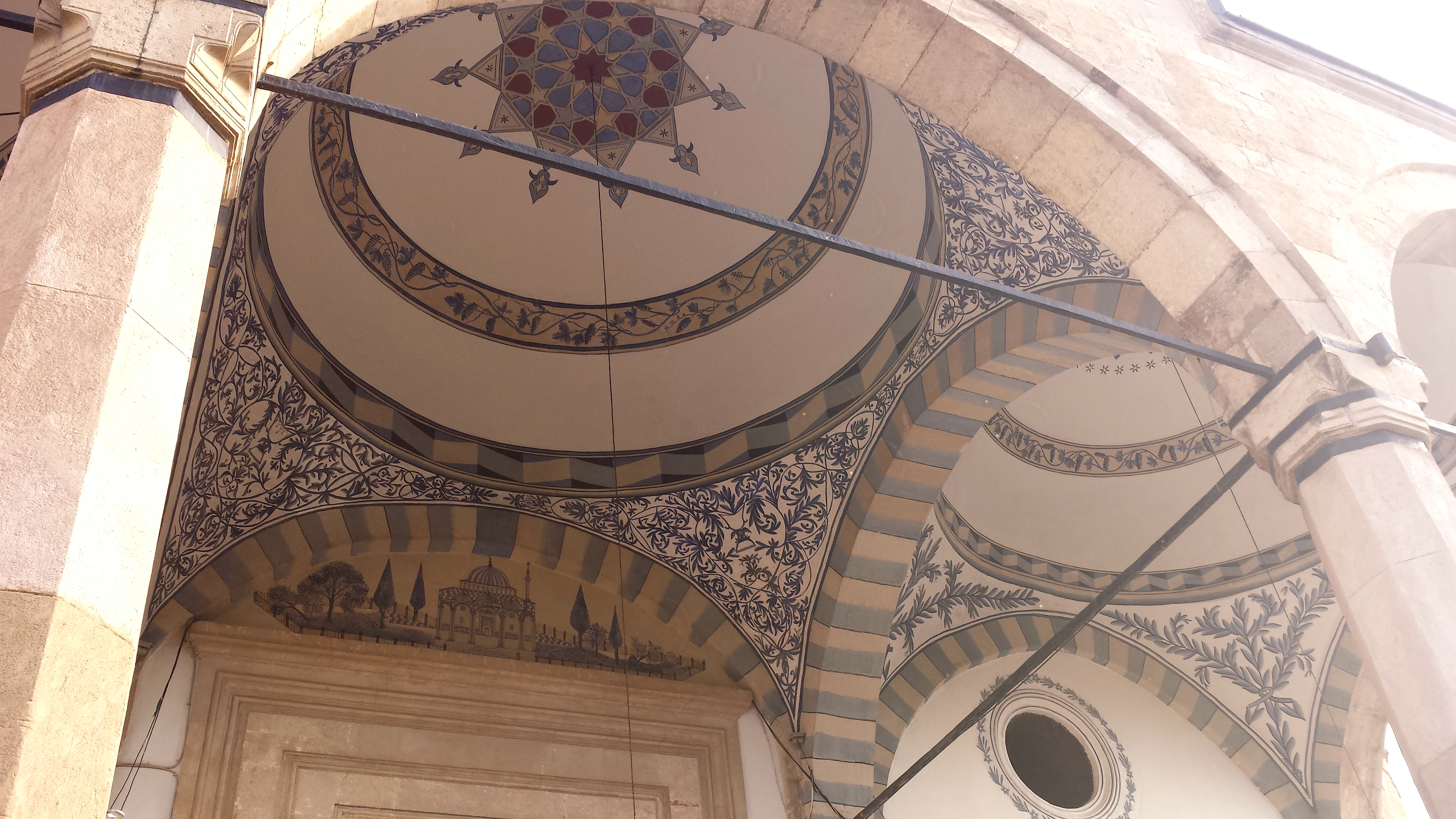
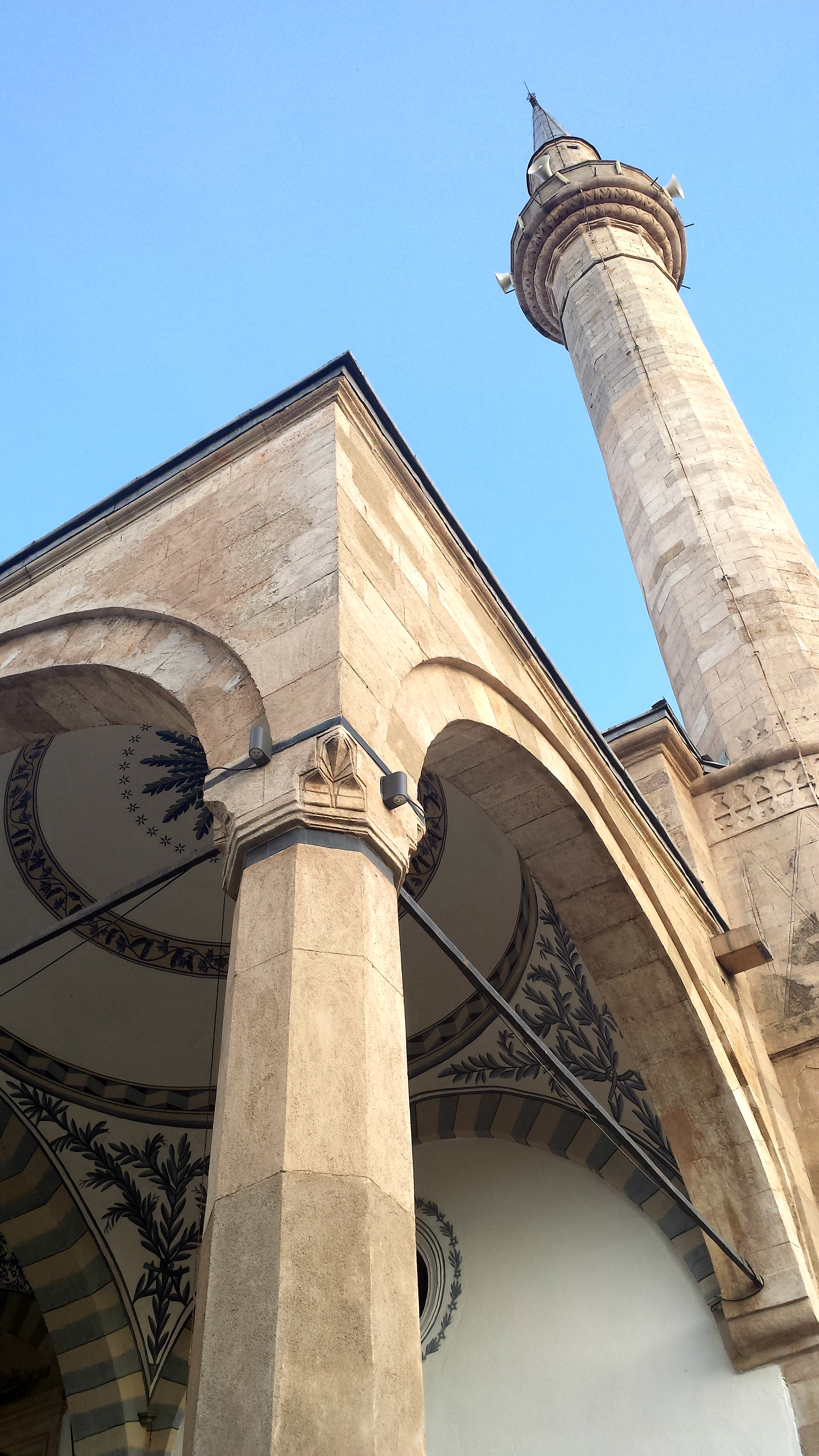
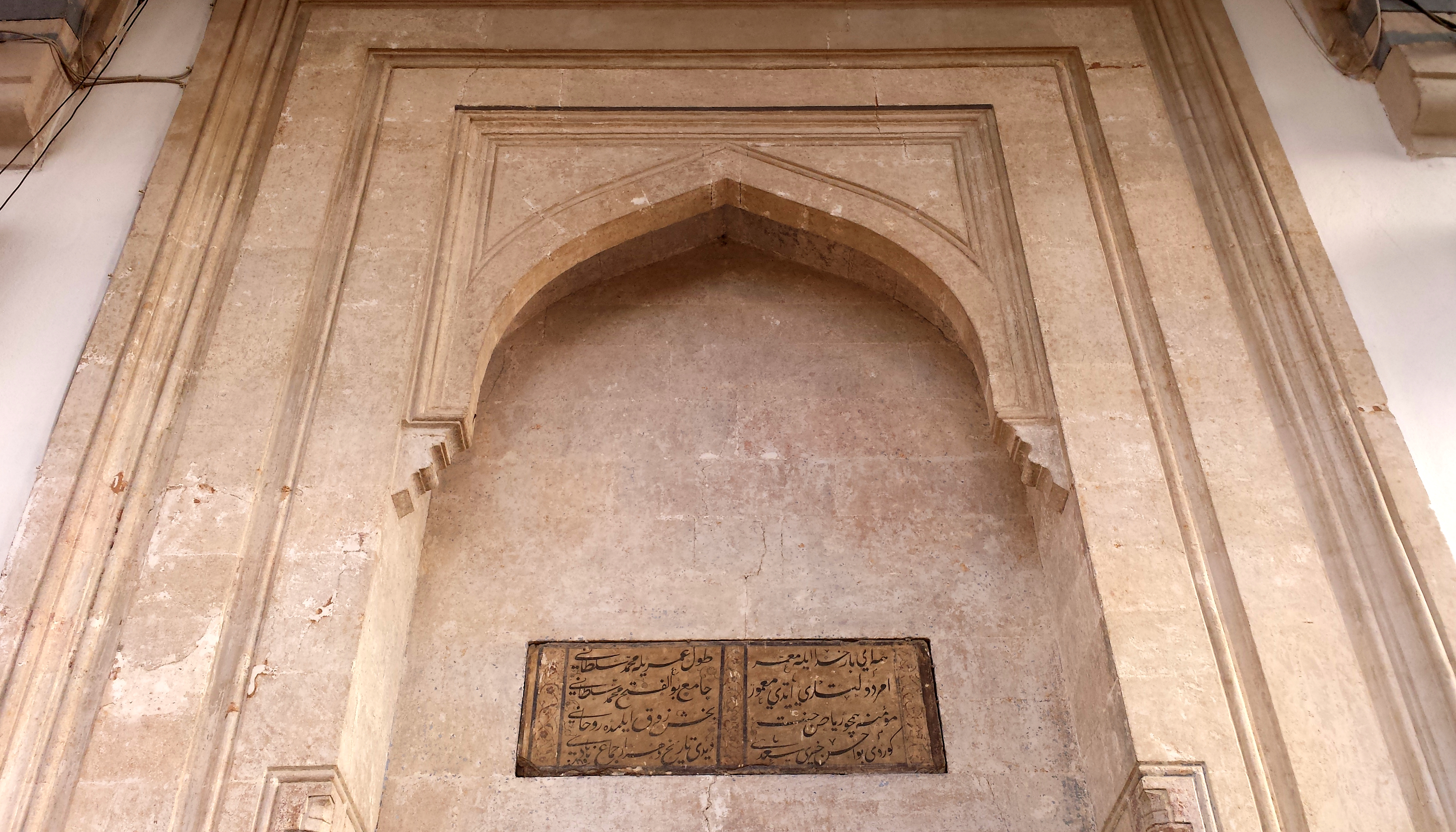
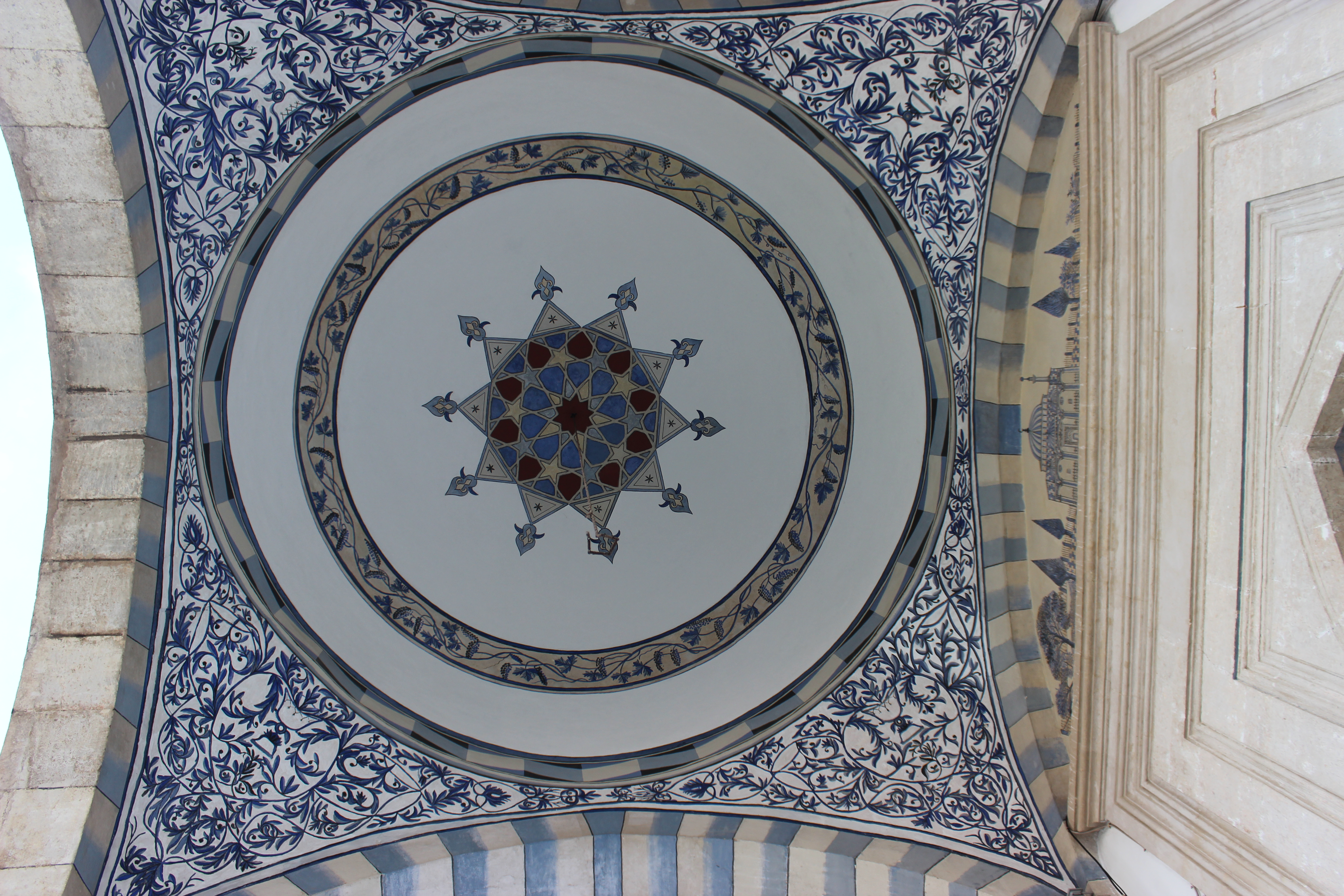

== See also ==
- Great Hamam of Pristina
- Religion in Kosovo
- Islam in Kosovo
- Tourism in Kosovo
