= First Albanian School in Pristina =

Cultural heritage monument of Kosovo

- Shkolla e parë shqipe në Prishtinë (Albanian)
- Interactive map of First Albanian School in Pristina
- Location: Pristina, Kosovo

History
- Built: 19th century

Cultural Heritage under Permanent Protection
- Official name: Shkolla e Parë Shqipe
- Type: Architectural Heritage: Monument/Ensemble
- Criteria: Under Protection
- Reference no.: 3194

The First Albanian School in Pristina is a cultural heritage monument in Pristina, Kosovo, and one of the oldest intact buildings in the entire city.

== History and description ==
The first school in Pristina where students were taught in the Albanian language is in the western historic city center at the corner of Trepça and Ilir Konushevci Streets. The two-story building was built in the late 19th century by local grandee Avdurrahman Pasha. In 1880, the original building burnt down, but it was rebuilt by his sons. In 1908, the gymnasium (Idadije) opened with 250 pupils. After World War II, it was once used as a barracks for the Yugoslav People's Army, and later housed some families. Unusually for the area and time, it features a square plan and measures 580 square metres (6,200 ft^{2}) across the floors of 290 square metres (3,100 ft^{2}) each, not counting a basement currently inaccessible but originally reachable as per photos of the southwestern façade. The plastered stone-brick walls have degraded over time. The mezzanine is wooden with clay mortar. Parts of the northeastern façade show renovations on the windows, but the southwestern one is largely original.
