= University of Gjilan =

Public university in Gjilan, Kosovo

Coordinates: 42.4693°N 21.4646°E

Kadri Zeka University
- Universiteti Kadri Zeka
- Former name: Pedagogical Academy (Shkolla e lartë pedagogjike)
- Type: Public research university
- Established: 2013; 13 years ago
- Affiliations: European University Foundation - Campus Europae; Sustainable Development Solutions Network
- Budget: €2.3 million
- Rector: Fitore Malaj
- Academic staff: 49 (2023)
- Location: Gjilan, District of Gjilan, Kosovo
- Campus: Urban
- Colors: Dark blue and gold
- Nickname: UKZ
- Website: https://www.uni-gjilan.net

The University of Gjilan "Kadri Zeka" (UGJKZ; Albanian: Universiteti i Gjilanit "Kadri Zeka", UGJKZ) is a public university located in Gjilan, Kosovo. It was originally established as a Pedagogical Academy in 1973 and has since grown into a modern university. The University of Gjilan "Kadri Zeka" was established by Decision No. 03/118 of the Government of the Republic of Kosovo on 06 March 2013. As of 2026, the University comprises several faculties: the Faculty of Economics, Faculty of Law, Faculty of Applied Sciences, Faculty of Education, and Faculty of Social Sciences and Faculty of Informatics.

The Faculty of Economics offers two Bachelor programs, being Marketing & Sales Management, Finance and Applied Accounting, and one Master program.

== See also ==
- Education in Gjilan
- Education in Kosovo
- University of Pristina
