= Great Hammam of Pristina =

Ottoman-era monument in Pristina, Kosovo

The Great Hamam of Pristina
- Hamami i Madh i Prishtinës
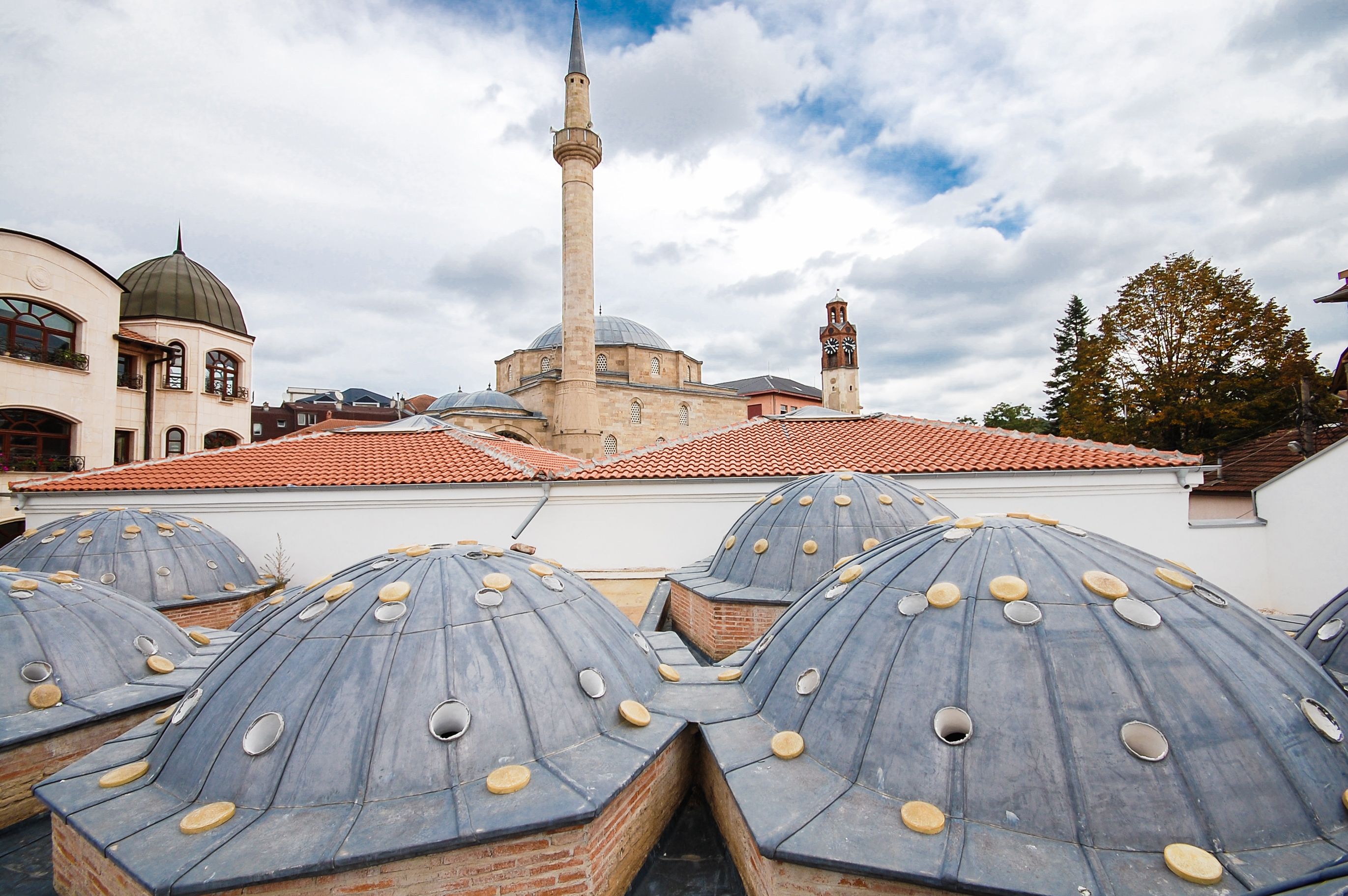
- Interactive map of The Great Hamam of Pristina
- Location: Pristina, Kosovo
- Coordinates: 42°40′0″N 21°9′59″E
- Designer: Sultan Mehmet Fatih
- Type: A double hamam
- Completion date: 15th century
- The great hamam of Prishtina is 800 m^{2} (8,600 sq ft)

Cultural Heritage under Permanent Protection
- Official name: Hamami i Madh
- Type: Architectural Heritage: Monument/Ensemble
- Reference no.: 2776

The Great Hammam of Pristina (Albanian: Hamami i madh i Prishtinës; Serbian: Велики хамам у Приштини / Veliki hamam u Prištini; Turkish: Fatih Sultan Mehmet Han Hamamı) is an Ottoman-era monument in Pristina, Kosovo. It was built in the 15th century and was part of the Imperial Mosque. During the summer and spring, it was used as a meeting place. Considered one of the most important buildings of the cultural and historical heritage, the Great Hammam of Pristina was in poor condition through the years until its restoration was approved.

The hammam is currently being restored and is planned to become the Museum of Pristina. The building is owned by the Municipality of Pristina and is under the protection of the Republic of Kosovo. It has been part of the cultural heritage per the decision of Memli Krasniqi of the Ministry of Culture, Youth and Sport, since October 2012. In 1985, during the Kosovo War, the hammam was considered a protected monument by the law "Protection of the Monument" number 19/77, according to architect Nol Binakaj. He stated that even though the hammam differed a lot from the original version, only the east part of the building and the main face of the building have been changed; the rest of the building has remained the same. It is a symbol of the old Pristina, together with the Clock Tower, Çarshia Mosque, Academy building, and the Imperial Mosque.

== Origin ==
The Great Hammam of Pristina was built in the second half of the 15th century and it was one of the first Ottoman objects to be built in the Republic of Kosovo. It is known as a part of the Sultan Mehmet Fatih Mosque, named after Mehmed the Conqueror. The hammam was visited by Pristina residents as a place to meet and socialize until the 1970s or the 1960s according to architect Nol Binakaj from the Housing Development and Management-Lund University. According to the legend, the builders who were part of the constructions were obligated by Sultan Mehmet al-Fatih to wash themselves in the Hammam twice a day.

== Architecture ==
The Great Hammam of Pristina is considered a double hammam because it has separate sections for men and women. It is approximately 800 square meters and has a quadrant shape. It has both a hot room and a cold room. The hot room has 16 domes, each containing 15 holes. On one of the domes, the middle hole is in the shape of either the Star of David or a regular pentagram. The holes' purpose is to let light into the hammam and to keep it warm. The hot section of the hammam includes the baths. This room was heated with steam from hypocausts beneath the marble floor. The building's walls are made of stone, on the other hand, the domes are made of bricks and were covered with bad sheets. The interior, however, was plastered with a traditional mortar called horasan, which is known to be resistant to humidity. The building generally uses stones that are carved in their corners and are linked with lime mortar. The "cold part" was reported to be covered by four domes, but no sign of this kind of construction was found. The hammam has an entrance hall, a middle warm area, and a main warm area.

== Damage through the years ==
After the building was abandoned, the hammam has been renovated several times. The installation of the new water supply and sewage system, without any criteria have resulted in the loss of building details and the structure was weakened. Even though the hammam is one of the oldest Ottoman buildings in Pristina, there has not been any maintenance since 1989. The building was used to only house construction materials. Three shops were opened in front of the building in 1994. The shops and the eastern part of the building were burned in 1995. According to the European Stability Initiative, the hammam needed protection from the black water. The walls are destroyed from this factor and other factors like time and improper constructions. Not until April 2007, the Municipality of Pristina decided to restore it intermittently.

== Restoration ==
Due to the hammam's poor condition, the Parliament of the Municipality of Pristina began collaborating with the Swedish company CHWB to restore the hammam in 2006. They formed a project board that included members from the municipality of Pristina, CHWB, the faculty of architecture from the University of Pristina and the Kosovo Council for the Cultural Heritage. The restoration was planned to have three phases: The first phase was about cleaning away the litter and earlier construction, and the removal of new walls. It ended in 2008. The restoration project was financed by CHWB and the restoration was done by a CHWB team, specialists in the restoration of historical monuments, and by a team or board from the municipality of Pristina. The second phase was to rebuild the domes, strengthen half of the building's structure, and consolidate the hammam. This phase lasted from 2009 to 2010 and was financed by CHWB and a Turkish team of experts under Zenep Ahunbay's supervision. In 2009, the municipality of Pristina allocated 300,000 euros for the hammam's restoration. The third phase's goal was to restore the building and install electricity. A company was chosen by the municipality of Pristina to run the project and was accepted by the project's board. They started work in 2012, though the Kosova Council for the Cultural Heritage and CHWB noted that changes were made to the plans. They said that the company chosen had no experience in monument restoration. The electrical work was destroying the original masonry, the materials chosen for restoration were inappropriate, the monument was being endangered by the atmospheric waters that further weakened the structure of the monument, Ottoman artifacts found in the monument were not treated properly, and this company was making irreversible changes and historic details of the hammam were being lost. CHWB warned the city and the Kosova Council for Cultural Heritage to terminate the contract with the company chosen for restoration, stating that if the city did not do what was included in the project, they would withdraw their support for Pristina. At the request of CHWB and the Kosova Council for Cultural Heritage, the Ministry of Culture, Youth and Sports ordered that the restoration of the Great Hammam of Pristina be discontinued on 27 February 2013. According to Top Channel, the hammam is currently under restoration with the decision of the Ministry of Culture, Youth and Sports.

== Installation art ==
In an attempt to use neglected sites in Pristina as art exhibition spaces for Manifesta 14, Japanese installation artist Chiharu Shiota hung hundreds of red threads of yarn from the Great Hammam’s ceiling. The exhibition had over 150,000 visitors.

== See also ==
- Religion in Kosovo
- Islam in Kosovo
- Tourism in Kosovo
