= Sheh Zeynel Abedini Tekke =

Cultural heritage monument of Kosovo

- Teqja e Sheh Zenel Abedinit (Albanian)

History
- Built: 18th century

Cultural Heritage under Permanent Protection
- Type: Architectural Heritage: Monument/Ensemble
- Criteria: Under Protection
- Part of: 02 – 156/80
- Reference no.: 2690

The Sheh Zenel Abedini Tekke is a cultural heritage monument in Topanicë, Kamenica, Kosovo. The khanqah (locally known as a tekke) dates to the 18th century and was used for ceremonies of the Khalwati order of Sufis.

== History and description ==
The one-story rectangular building includes two alcoves. A half-open portico faces northwest flanked by five carved wooden pilasters, two of them featuring ivory carvings. Part of the upper façade above shows what is left of an engraved frieze. Each alcove served a distinctive purpose. The mejda odasi hosted gatherings of dervishes before and after their ceremonies or dhikr, and opens through a door on its western wall to the portico adjacent to its chimney.

The ceremonial semahane is near the first room in the southern corner, with the entrances about 30 cm apart. Two of the five gates of the semahane face east, two of them face south, and one faces west. Square windows include smaller pointed semicircular openings on their left. The mihrab east of the second alcove remains. In the room are a made bed, several photos, improvised tombs, and ritual items such as three swords, a pair of handcuffs, and a flag.

The khanqah was built from stone, adobe, wood, and mud mortar, topped with a four-layer clay tile roof extending over the porticos. The stone yard wall was renovated after the Kosovo War. Seven tombs nearby include those of Zeynel, Rusta, Ibrahim, Ali, Ismail, Abdyl, and an unknown foreigner. In 2012, the worn khanqah was extensively repaired, including renovations to the roof, interior and exterior plastering, window and door replacement, and landscaping of the courtyard.
