= Haxhi Zeka Mill =

Cultural heritage monument and mill in Kosovo

Coordinates: 42°39′47″N 20°17′58″E

- Mulliri i Haxhi Zekës
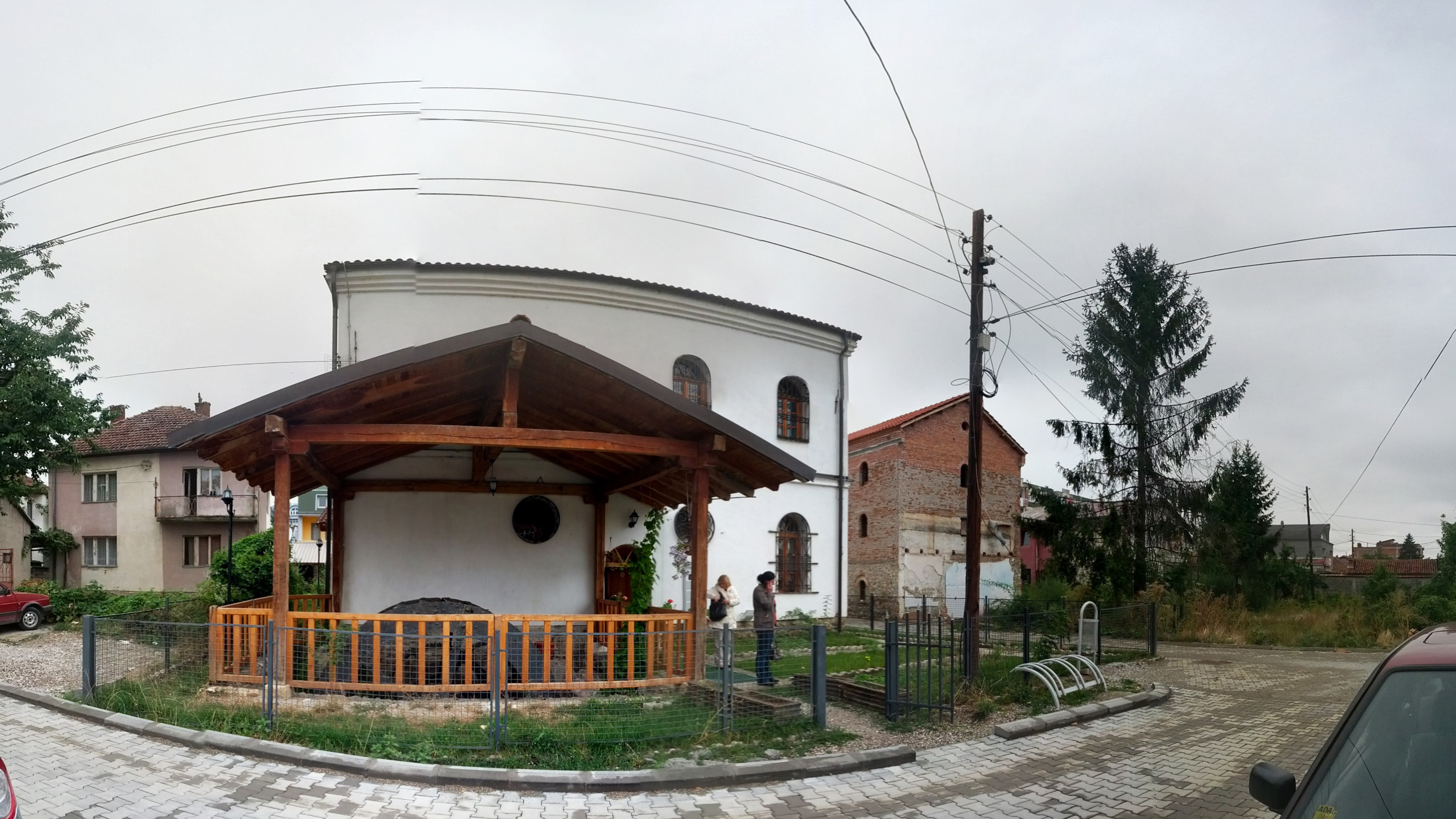
- Haxhi Zeka Mill from the nearby road.
- Location: Pejë, Kosovo
- Designer: Haxhi Zeka
- Type: Mill
- Material: Stone, concrete and wood
- Completion date: 1850s
- Restored date: After the Kosovo War
- Dedicated to: Haxhi Zeka
- Dismantled date: 1994 and 1999

Cultural Heritage under Permanent Protection
- Official name: Kulla e Haxhi Zekës (Kulla shqiptare e Jashar Pashës)
- Type: Architectural Heritage: Monument/Ensemble
- Reference no.: 597

The Haxhi Zeka Mill (Albanian: Mulliri i Haxhi Zekës) is an Albanian protected archeological heritage monument and previous mill located in the city of Peja, Kosovo. It was built and named after Albanian revolutionary Haxhi Zeka.

== Overview ==
The mill was built in the 1850s by Haxhi Zeka and served as one of the first mills in the region and was used by the majority of the population of Peja for processing wheat. It initially ran on water-power through a wooden wheel located in the garden of the mill, before switching to electric energy. The equipment used by the mill was donated by Austria-Hungary. The mill is a two-story building built by stone, concrete and wood on a 10 acre garden. The entrance to the garden is a stone bridge which connects the mill with the rest of the city. In the 1960s, it served as a kitchen for the nearby "Ramiz Sadiku" school, before being transformed into a bread factory until 1974. In 1977 it gained protection from UNESCO as a historical and cultural heritage monument of Kosovo. It was burned in 1994 by Serbian locals and once again destroyed in 1999 during the Kosovo War, before being rebuilt after the war. The monument is open to visitors.
