= Balec Mosque =

Mosque in Gjilan, Kosovo

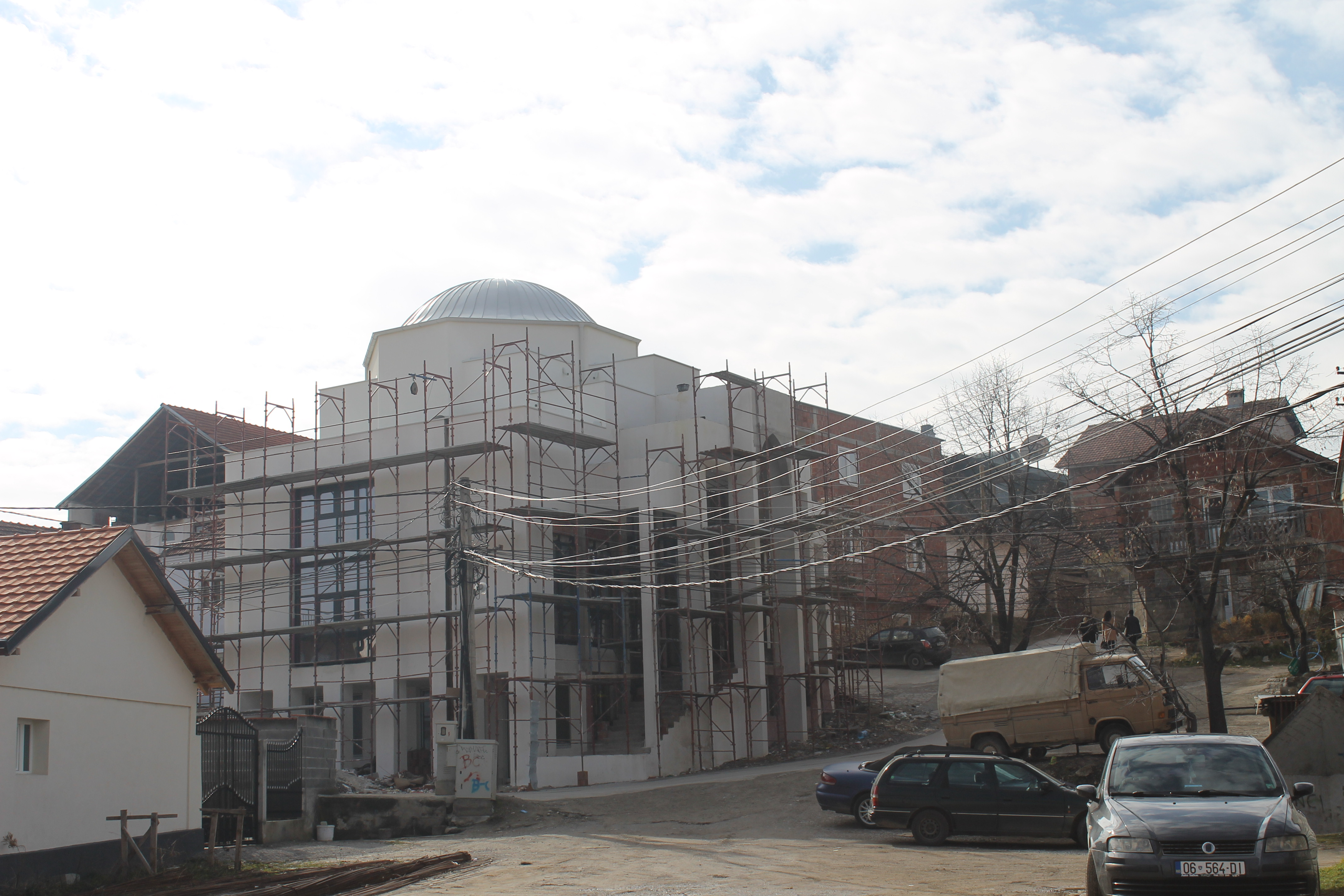

Religion
- Affiliation: Sunni Islam

Location
- Location: Gjilan
- Country: Kosovo
- Interactive map of Balec Mosque

Architecture
- Type: mosque
- Established: 1905; 121 years ago
- Demolished: 2016
- Cultural Heritage under Permanent Protection
- Official name: Xhamia në Mëshinë
- Type: Architectural Heritage: Monument/Ensemble
- Criteria: Under Protection
- Reference no.: 245

The Balec Mosque (Albanian: Xhamia e Balecit) is named after the Balec neighborhood of Gjilan, Kosovo, where it was built in 1905, at the time on the outskirts of the city.

It was built by Hysen Pasha Milla as his endowment or waqf. The minaret dates to a 1973–74 renovation. There was no ablution fountain or shadirvan, but a water pump is nearby.

The mosque was demolished for rebuilding in 2016 and is still under reconstruction.

== See also ==
- Islam in Kosovo
- Religion in Kosovo
