= Education in Gjilan =

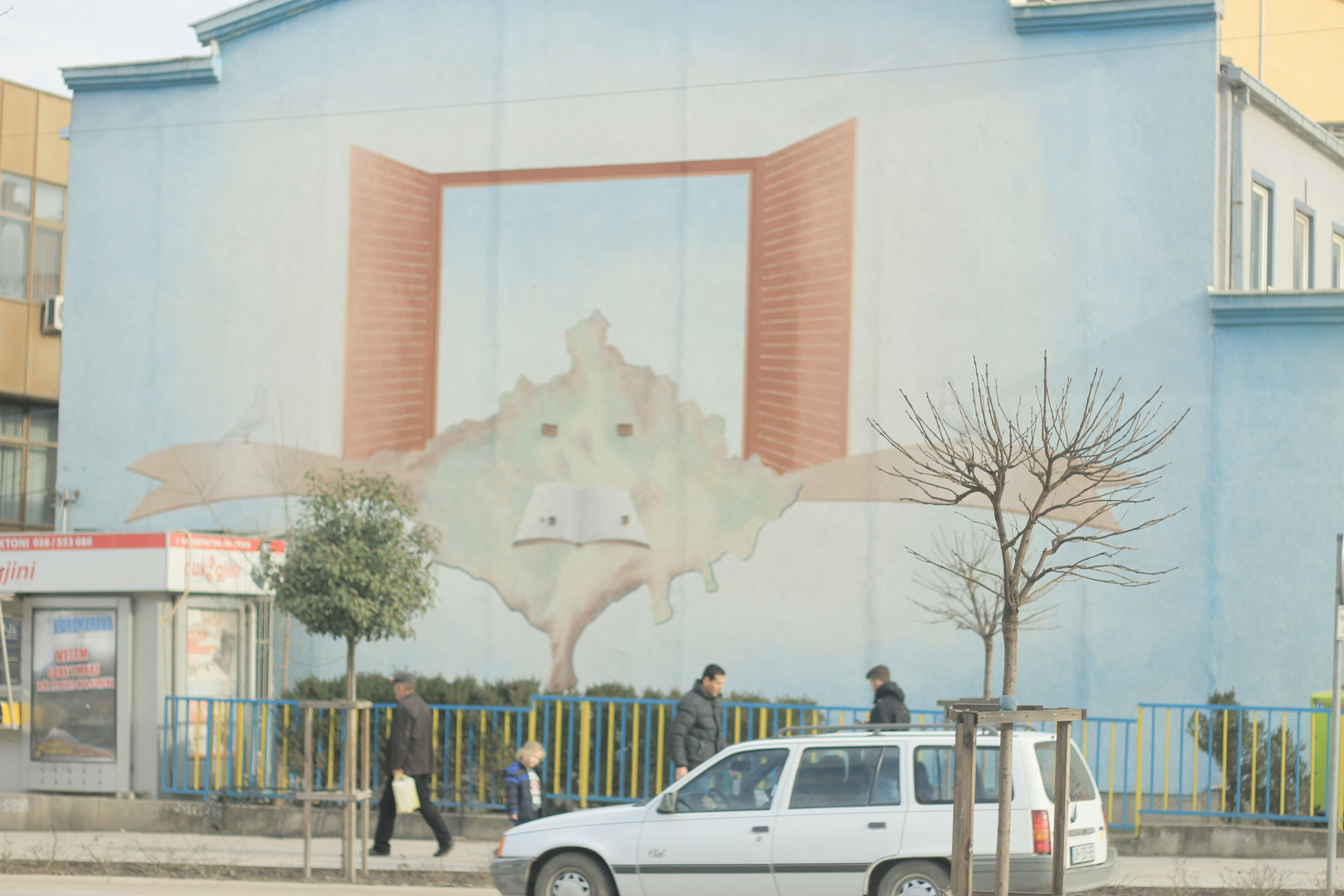
Primary school "Thimi Mitko" Gjilan

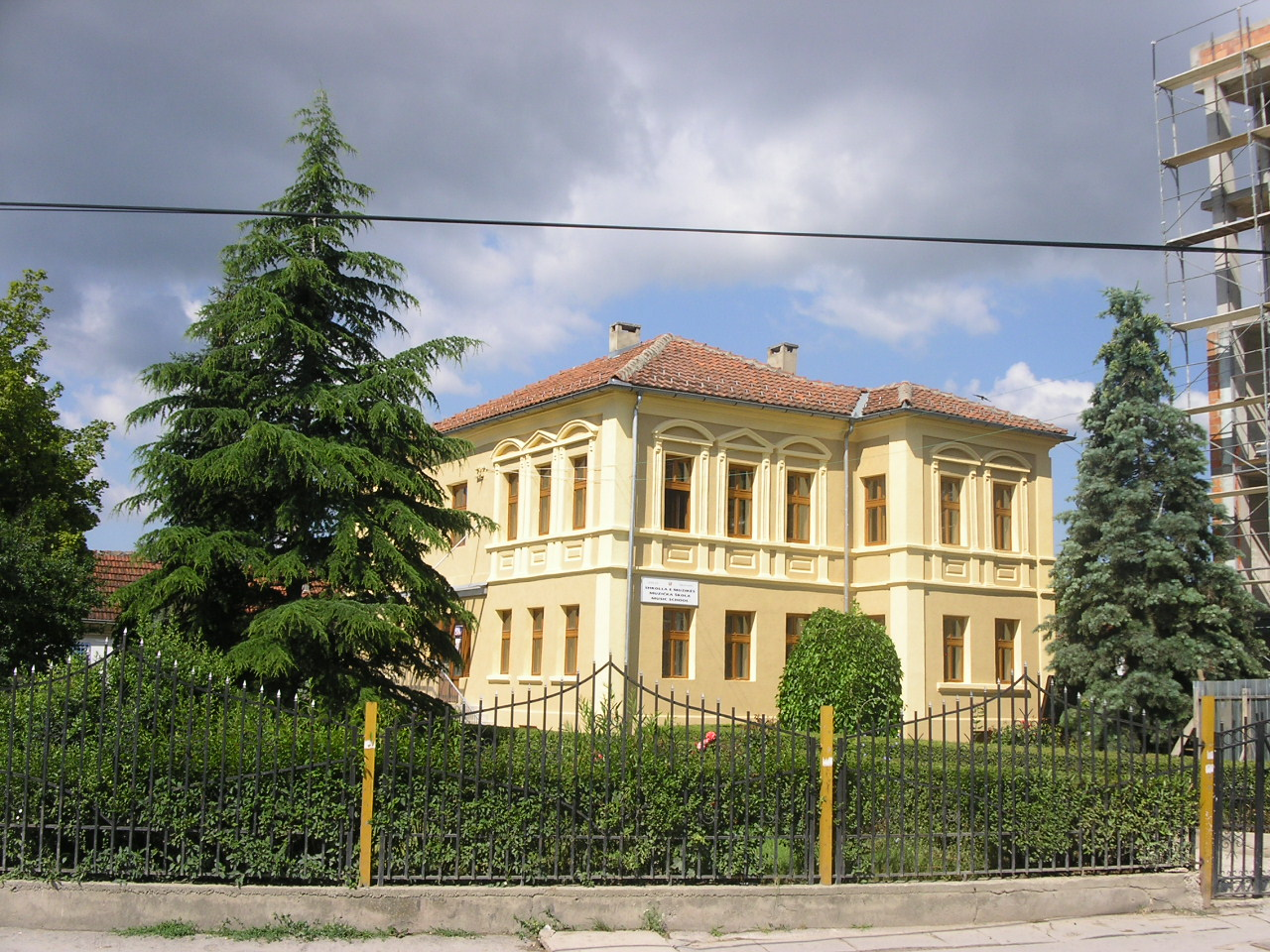
School of Music Gjilan

Education in Gjilan includes primary, secondary education, and a public university. In 2018, the Organization for Security and Co-operation in Europe estimated that there were 18,370 students enrolled in kindergarten, primary and secondary educational institutions in Gjilan.

== Statistics ==
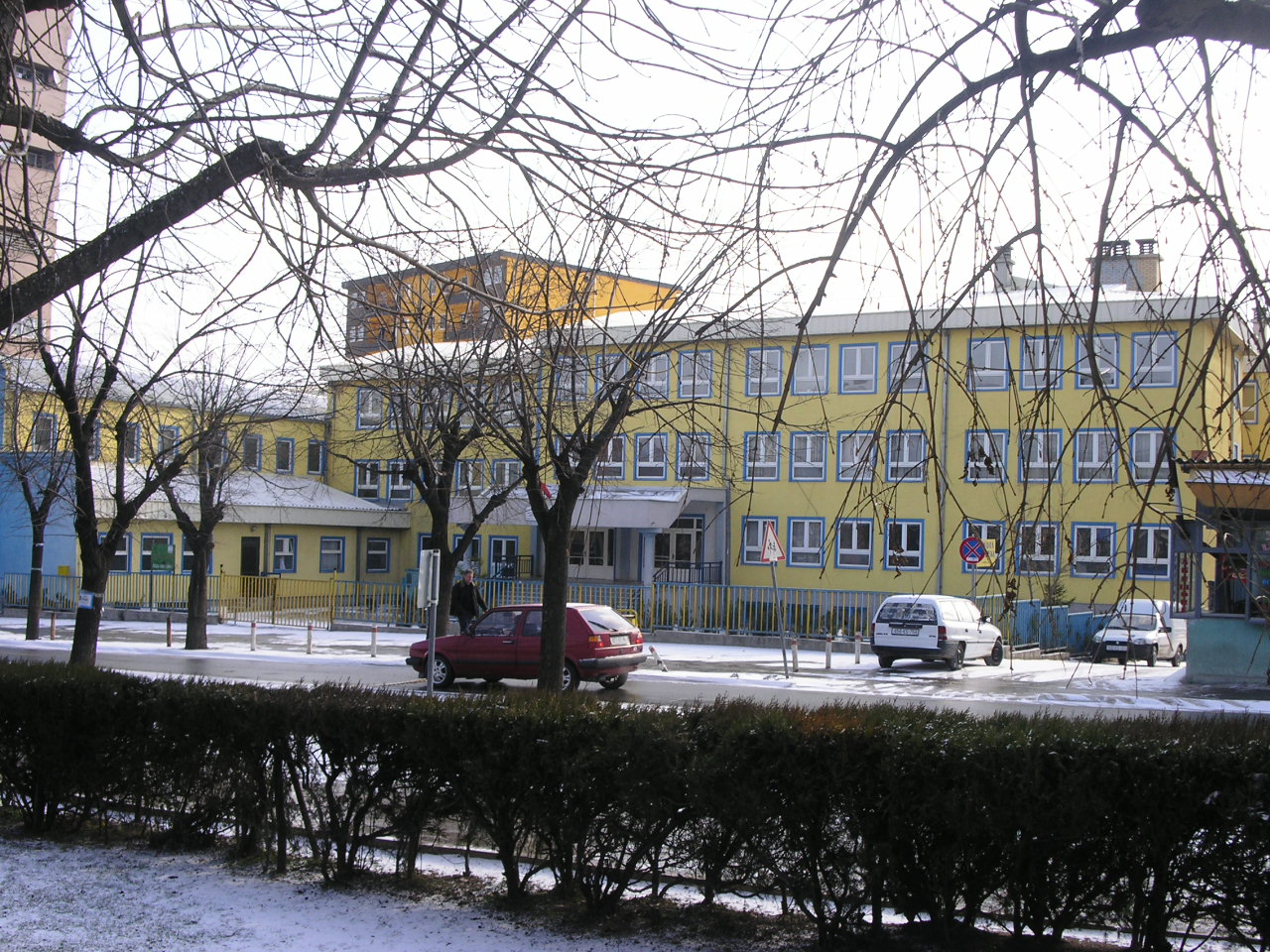
Image primary school Thimi Mitko in the center of Gnjilane

In 2018, there were a total of 18,370 students enrolled in kindergarten, primary and secondary educational institutions in Gjilan. 17,822 of them were Albanians, while the rest were members ofethnic minorities (Serbs, Roma and Turks). Most intuitions follow the Kosovo curriculum while a few select follow the Serbian curriculum in Kosovo Serb villages. There were a total of 1,460 teachers.

== Primary education ==
According to the municipality laws, primary education ranges from Grades 1 to 5 and includes lower secondary education from Grades 6 to 9. It is obligatory and free for all citizens.

As of 2018, there were 12,370 students in 29 primary schools, of which 12,023 were ethnic Albanians and 347 members of ethnic minorities.

== Secondary education ==
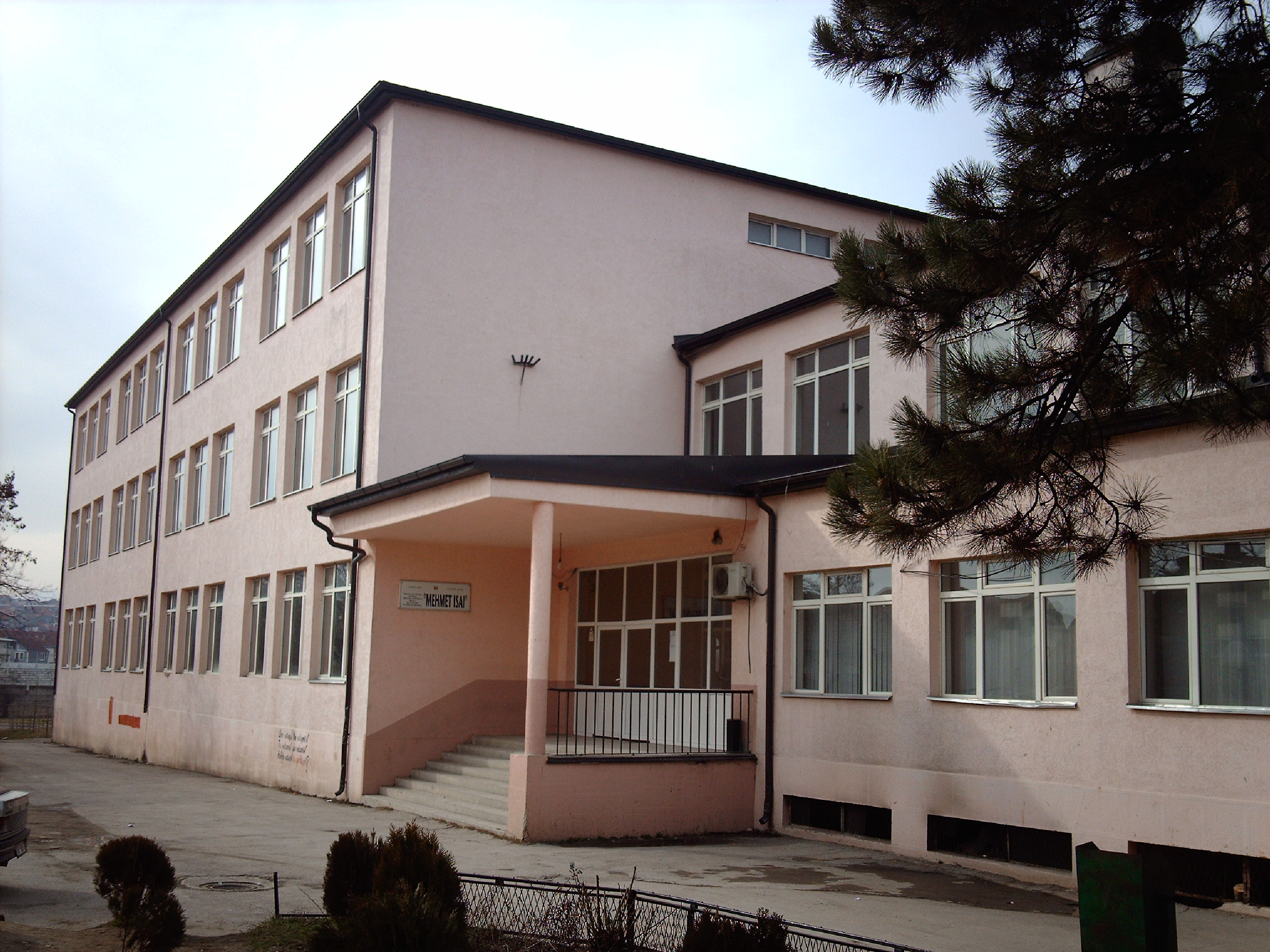
The higher secondary education is categorized in professional, Teknic school " Mehmet Isai ", Gjilan

The higher secondary education is categorized in professional and general education and predominantly lasts around 3–4 years conditional on the educational curriculum that is planned by Kosovo's Ministry of Education. This level of education is not mandatory but nevertheless highly encouraged as it prepares students to pursue university or post-secondary studies.

As of 2018, there were nine secondary schools with 5,650 students of which 5,449 were Albanians and the rest minority groups.

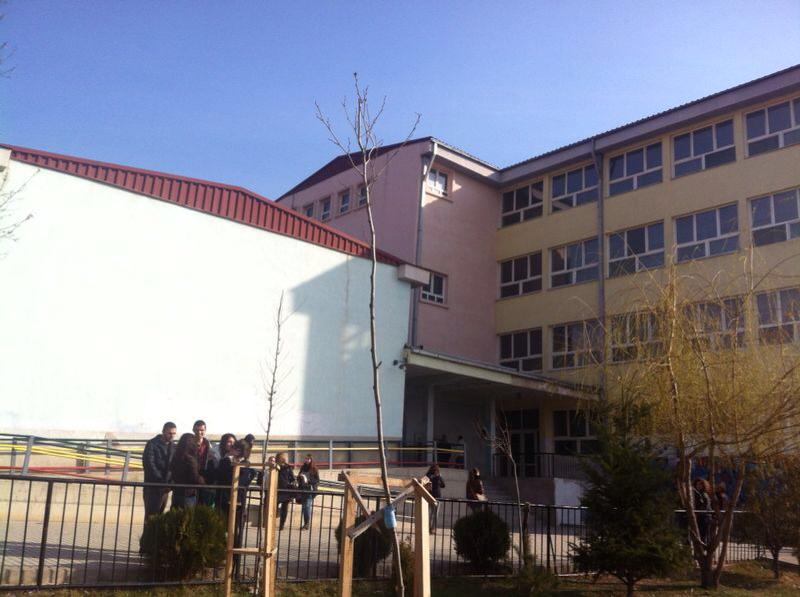
Zenel Hajdini High School in Gjilan

== Universities ==
Higher Education is available in different educational institutions, both in public or private institutions where students are offered an Associate Degree, Bachelor's Degree, Master's degree and PhD.

Various changes have been made so that higher education institutions adapt to European standards. The Ministry of Education, Science, and Technology has created the Kosovo Accreditation Agency (KAA) according to Kosovo's law on high education for the aim of assessing the appropriate quality in the higher education private and public institutions.

The Public University of Gjilan "Kadri Zeka" is located in Gjilan. It opened on 1 October 2013.

The Kosovo Education system follows the International Standard Classification of Education:

ISCED LEVELS	Format structure of the Kosovo Education system	Ages
	Adult education/lifelong learning inbroad terms (formal and non-formal)	23–24+
ISCED-6	Post-university ed	23−24+
ISCED-5	University Ed	
ISCED-4	Post-secondary (non-university education)	18+
ISCED-3	Upper-secondary Education (Grades 10−12)	15−17
ISCED-2	Lower-secondary Education (Grades 6-9)	11−14
ISCED-1	Primary Education (Grades 1−-5)	6−10
ISCED-0	Pre-Primary Education (Grade 0)	5−6
	Pre-school education	Birth−5

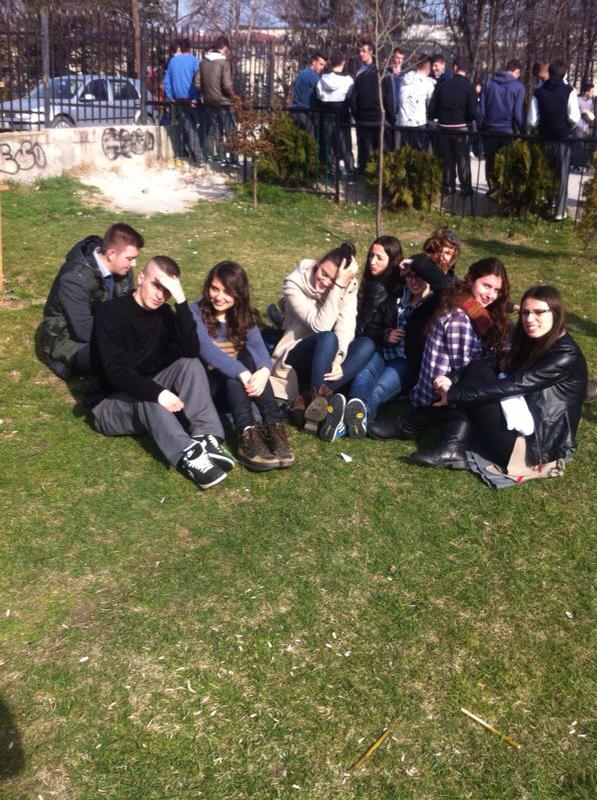
Students in their free lessons.

== Department of Education ==
The municipality of Gjilan has a Directorate for Education. It is responsible for the employment and wages of teaching staff in educational institutions of the municipality, it participates in the selection of principals and teachers to be employed in municipal schools, identifies needs in collaboration with the Senior Education Officer for the municipality and ensures free use of buildings and facilities of municipal schools by teachers and support staff as defined in Article 28 of the Law on Primary and Secondary Education.

It also is responsible for the registration of personal data for students, according to the form approved by MASHT and in compliance with the law, cooperates with the Government on planning and coordinating the development of pre-primary and secondary education in Kosovo, plans the development of pre-primary and secondary education in the municipality, in consultation with MEST and other municipalities, among many other functional responsibilities as outlined by the law.

== Department for Science and Technology ==
The Department of Science and Technology is part of MEST which is responsible for overseeing the development of science, research and fostering modern technology developments. Another aspect of the activities of DST is the coordination of works with the science state and public bodies, like the National Science Council, Kosovo Academy of Arts and Science, independent scientific institutions, public universities, and other public and private institutions.

The department has many responsibilities including allocating means to public providers for research within the general provisions of the law, planning and organizing the structure of the higher education and scientific institutions in Kosovo based on economic and social needs, as well as working with other institutions for the development and integration of higher education institutions into the European Area.

It cooperates with the Institute of Albanology, Institute of History as well as the Institute of Pedagogy, with the focus on the development of the scientific, research and managing activities of these institutions. The department also has developed its cooperation activities with the National and University Library. In cooperation with the PPKA (Partnership Project Kosove- Austria), MEST has also managed to establish the Board of the Center for Innovation and Technology Transfer (CITT) which consists of nine members. This board has drafted and approved the working regulation of CITT, and has organized meetings with external and internal experts in the field.

== Budget ==
The most recent budget for education is as follows:

Explanation	Staff	Wages	Services	City expenses	Subventions and transfers	Capital expenses	Total
Income (Total city expenses)	2005	65,000.00	118.000.00	4800.00	48.000.00	400.000.00	635.800.00
Outer Finance (Total city expenses)							
Governmental Grants (Administration)		65.000.00	56.536.00	3000.00			511.264.00
Inner Income (Administration)				61.464.00	1800.00	48.000.00	400.000.00
Outer Finance (Administration)	12						
Governmental Grants (Pre-school)	73	188.642.00	128.200.00	30.900.00			347,742.00
Inner income (Pre-school)				15,000	8000.00		211.642.0
Outer income (Pre-school)							
Governmental Grants (Primary-School)	1390	4,258,311.00	269.000.0	89.000.0			~
Inner income (Primary-school)	1390	4,258,311.00	215.000.0	55.000.00			~
Outer income (Primary-school)							
Governmental grants (Middle school and University)	530	1.799.647.00	88.000.00				~
Inner income (Middle school and University)			63,000.00				~
Outer income (Middle school and University)			25.000.00				~

== Head of Department of Education in Gjilan ==
The Head of Department of Education in Gjilan is responsible for:

- Management and coordination of pre-primary, primary and secondary education in the municipality.
- Recruitment of teachers and other school personnel in accordance with legal procedures.
- Registration, inspection of public health and safety and licensing of preschool educational institutions in accordance with the law
- Respect for and promotion of the rights of communities and their members
- Identify needs for professional directors and teachers and their implementation in cooperation with the applicable laws.
