= Old Hammam (Mitrovica) =

Cultural heritage monument in Mitrovica, Kosovo

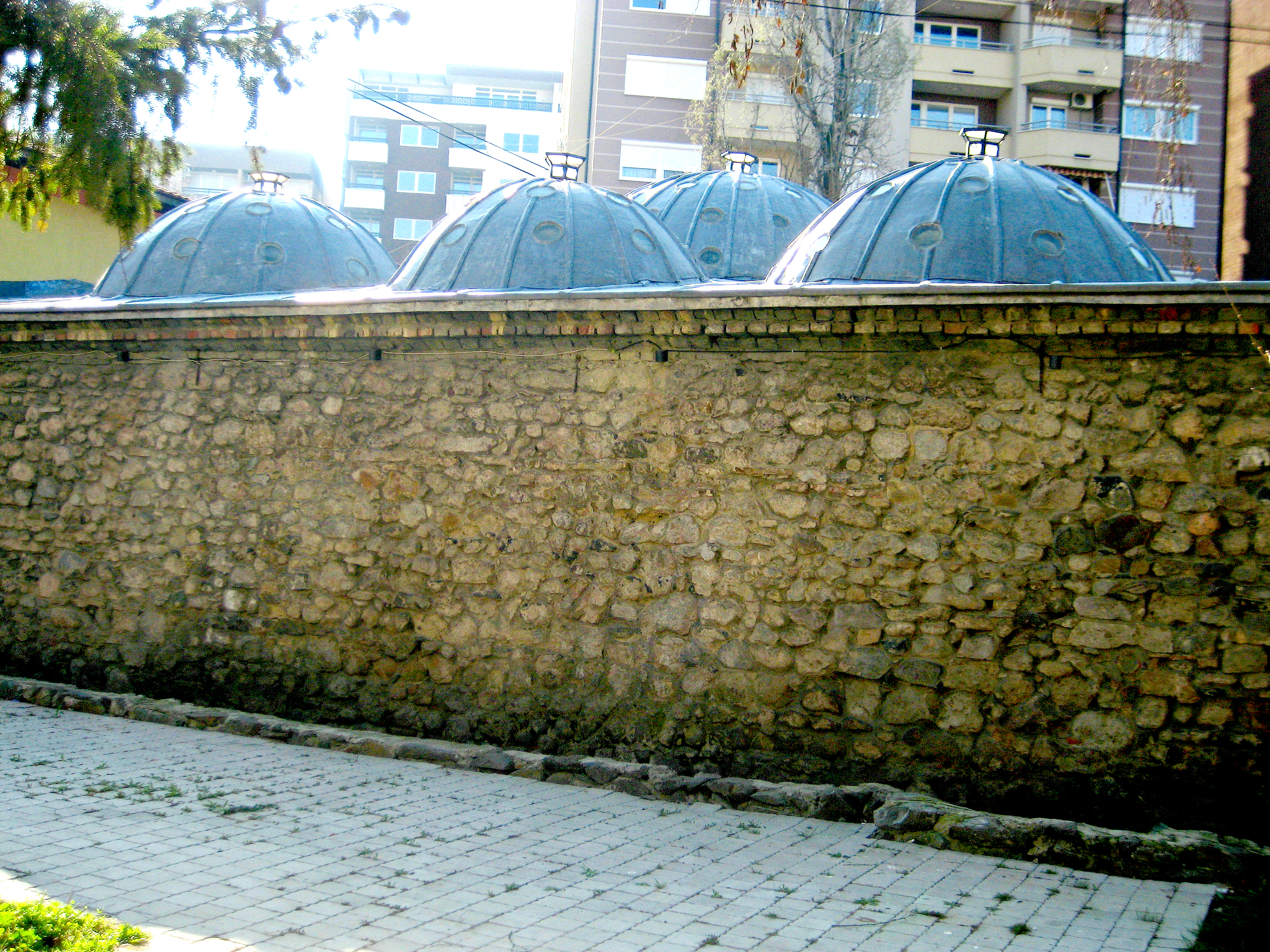
The Building of the Old Hamam in Mitrovica, showing four of the eight small domes.

The Old City Hammam in Mitrovica is representative of the Ottoman architecture in Kosovo.

== History ==
The Old City Hammam was constructed in oriental style by Sulejman Pashe Berisha and his nephew Zejnullah Beg Berisha in the 18th century. A right-angled annex, 15 m long and 10 m wide was added at the end of the 19th century. It is the only hammam (bathhouse) in Kosovo built by members of a family and not by the government and, at that time was an essential part of the city and fully used as a bathhouse. It took two years to build.

The roof of the building has nine domes, one large central dome and eight small ones, all covered in lead and zinc. Its walls are made of large stones, and are 80 cm (31 in) wide. The first floor is paved with marble and in the center there is a water fountain. The second floor was used to get undressed before going into the hot area. The main part of the hammam has four rooms. A 40-ton boiler was used to supply the rooms with water. The hammam and the annex cover more than 1200 square meters. This space was used by men and women at different times. Men used the bath in the morning from 7 to 10 am, and women from 11 am to 5 pm. Fridays and Sundays were reserved for men. The hammam was also used for weddings and other celebrations, remmaining fully functional until May 1959.

The monument represents special oriental architecture value and has been protected since 1957. From 1960 to 2009 the building was used as a regional museum with four sectors: archaeology, ethnology, geology and history. In 2009, the museum moved to an ex-army building. From November 2009, the building was returned to the heir of the ex-owner and now a part of it operates as a restaurant.

== See also ==
- Mitrovica, Kosovo
