= Radac =

- Radavc, Kryedrin
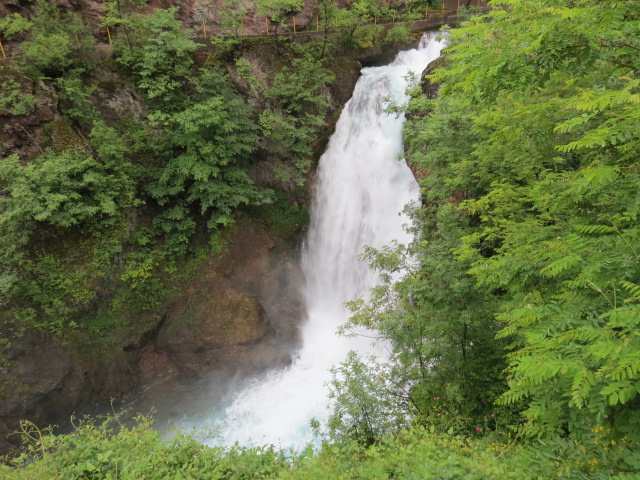
- The White Drin Waterfall that is located in the village.
- Interactive map of Radac

Population (2024)
  - Total: 1,013

Radac (Serbian: Radavac Радавац; Albanian: Radacë, definite form: Radaca; also known as Radavc, or Kryedrin) is a village located in Peja, Kosovo.

== History ==
This village was likely inhabited since prehistoric times. A man's femur was reportedly discovered in the Bukuroshja e Fjetur Cave. Due to its lack of written history, the majority of the village's history is known through tradition.

== Demographics ==
According to the last official census of 2024, the population of Radac is 1,013. Nearly all the inhabitants are Albanians.

== Attractions ==
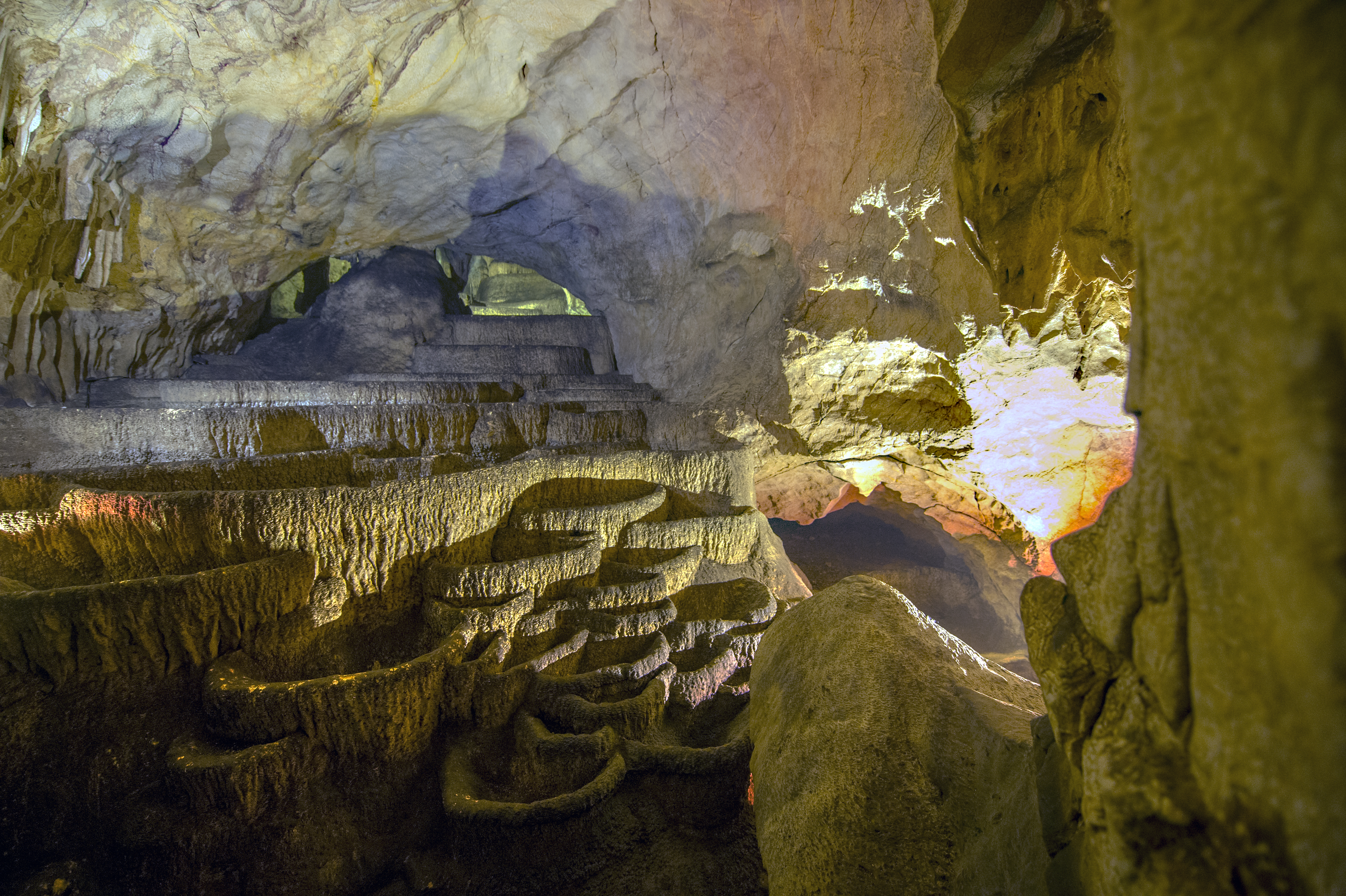
Bukuroshja e Fjetur Cave (Sleeping Beauty Cave)

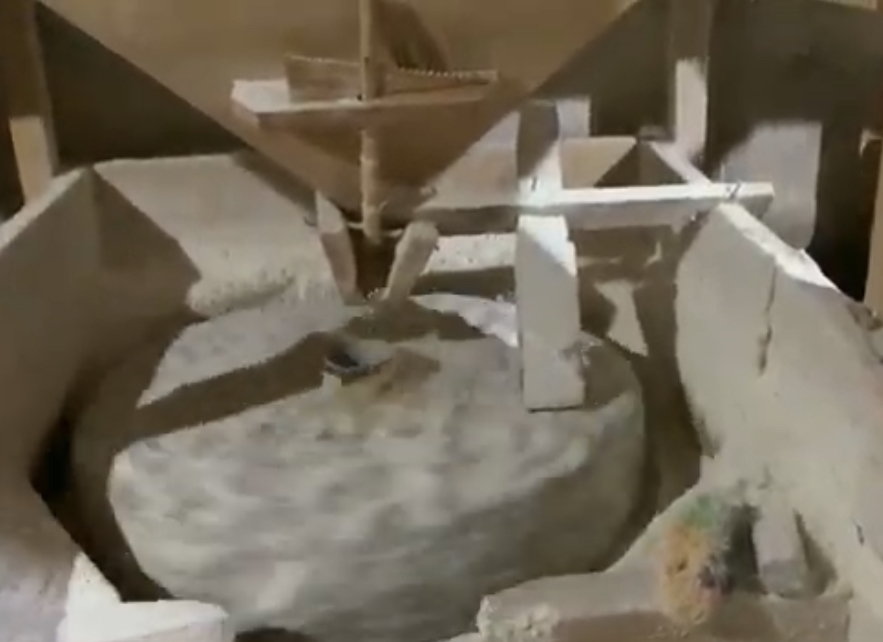
The inside of the Bërdynaj Mill in 2019.

Radac has seen a considerable growth in tourism and tourist attractions since the turn of the century. This is, in part, thanks to the opening of the resort at the White Drin Waterfall. There are also several other restaurants that take advantage of the village's natural scenery. The Bukuroshja e Fjetur Cave is also open for tourism. There is also a mill in the village that has been run by the Bërdynaj family, the largest family of the village, for at least 250 years.

== Geography ==
Radac is located about 4.6 km (2.9 mi) north of the city of Peja. It is also about 5 km (3.1 mi) east of Kosovo's border with Montenegro. To the north and west of the village are the Accursed Mountains. The village is relatively hilly.

=== Climate ===
Radac has a humid subtropical climate (Cfa). The winters are cold whereas the summers are hot and relatively humid. Due to its proximity to the Adriatic Sea, Radac has mild Mediterranean influence during the summers. The village's coldest month is February and its hottest is July.

Climate data for Radac (and surrounding areas in 2023)
Month	Jan	Feb	Mar	Apr	May	Jun	Jul	Aug	Sep	Oct	Nov	Dec	Year
Mean daily maximum °F	48.7	50.5	57.4	58.8	71.1	78.3	90	86.7	84.0	73.2	55.9	50.9	67.1
Daily mean °F	40.1	39.0	46.8	49.1	60.6	67.3	75.6	73.6	70.2	60.6	47.1	41	55.9
Mean daily minimum °F	31.3	27.3	36.1	39	50	56.3	61.3	60.3	56.3	48.0	38.1	31.1	45
Mean daily maximum °C	9.3	10.3	14.1	14.9	21.7	25.7	32	30.4	28.9	22.9	13.3	10.5	19.5
Daily mean °C	4.5	3.9	8.2	9.5	15.9	19.6	24.2	23.1	21.2	15.9	8.4	5	13.3
Mean daily minimum °C	−0.4	−2.6	2.3	4	10	13.5	16.3	15.7	13.5	8.9	3.4	−0.5	7
Source: Accuweather
