= Saint Anthony's Church, Gjakova =

Cultural heritage monument of Kosovo

Coordinates: 42°22′22″N 20°25′27″E

Saint Anthony's Church
- Kisha katolike e Shën Andonit (Albanian)
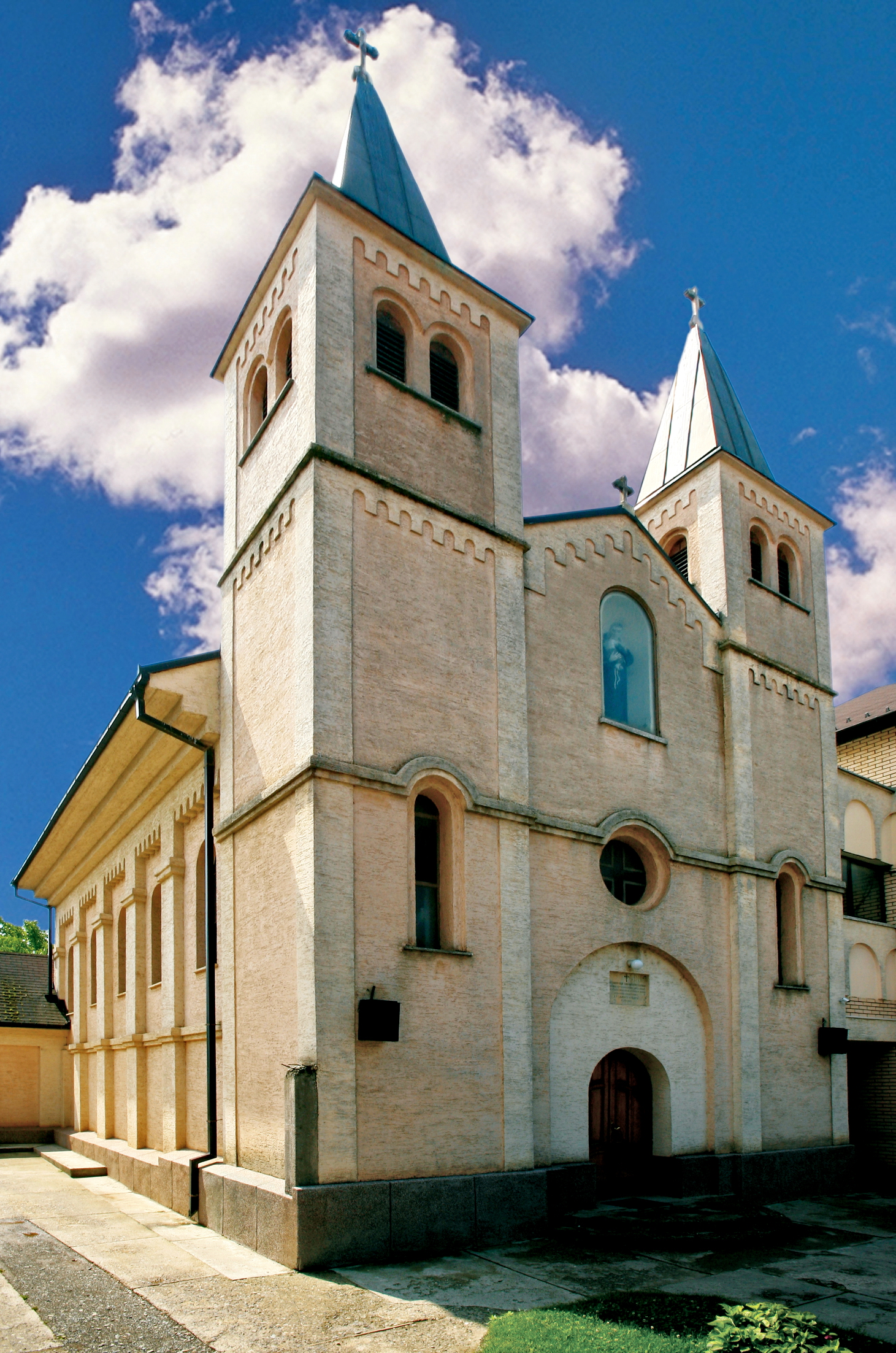
- Interactive map of Saint Anthony's Church
- Location: Gjakova, Kosovo

History
- Built: 19th century

Saint Anthony's Church (Albanian: Kisha Katolike e Shën Andonit, also known as Kisha e Shna Ndout) is a catholic church and a cultural heritage monument in Gjakova, Kosovo.

== History and description ==
Saint Anthony's Church is located on “Rruga e Katolikëve,” Gjakova's so-called “Catholic street,” opposite Saint Paul and Saint Peter’s Church. The first church, named Father Milan's Church, was built there in 1882 but later destroyed. In 1931, Father Lorenc Mazreku built the present church on the same grounds and dedicated it to Saint Anthony of Padua, known in the Albanian language as Shen Ndout. Renovations since yielded lodgings, offices, and bathrooms, but all have largely preserved the original structure, including its rectangular nave and dual bell tower oriented west-to-east. A simple, unadorned arch entryway leads through the narthex and nave to the chapel and in turn to the sacristy. The sparse interior rests on a rectangular, almost symmetrical foundation. Administrative offices are hosted in an adjoining building on the south side. The altar lies on a square platform next to the nave and dominates the interior. The eastward bell towers by the entrance have simple square capstones. In the early 1990s, extensive interior renovations introduced the latest marble and ceramic materials, but the exterior remains humbly decorated, including the four windows each on the northern and southern façades. It was damaged by Serbian soldiers during the Kosovo War.
