= Kusari Cave =

Cave in Kosovo

- Albanian: Shpella e Kusarit; Serbian: Kusari pećina
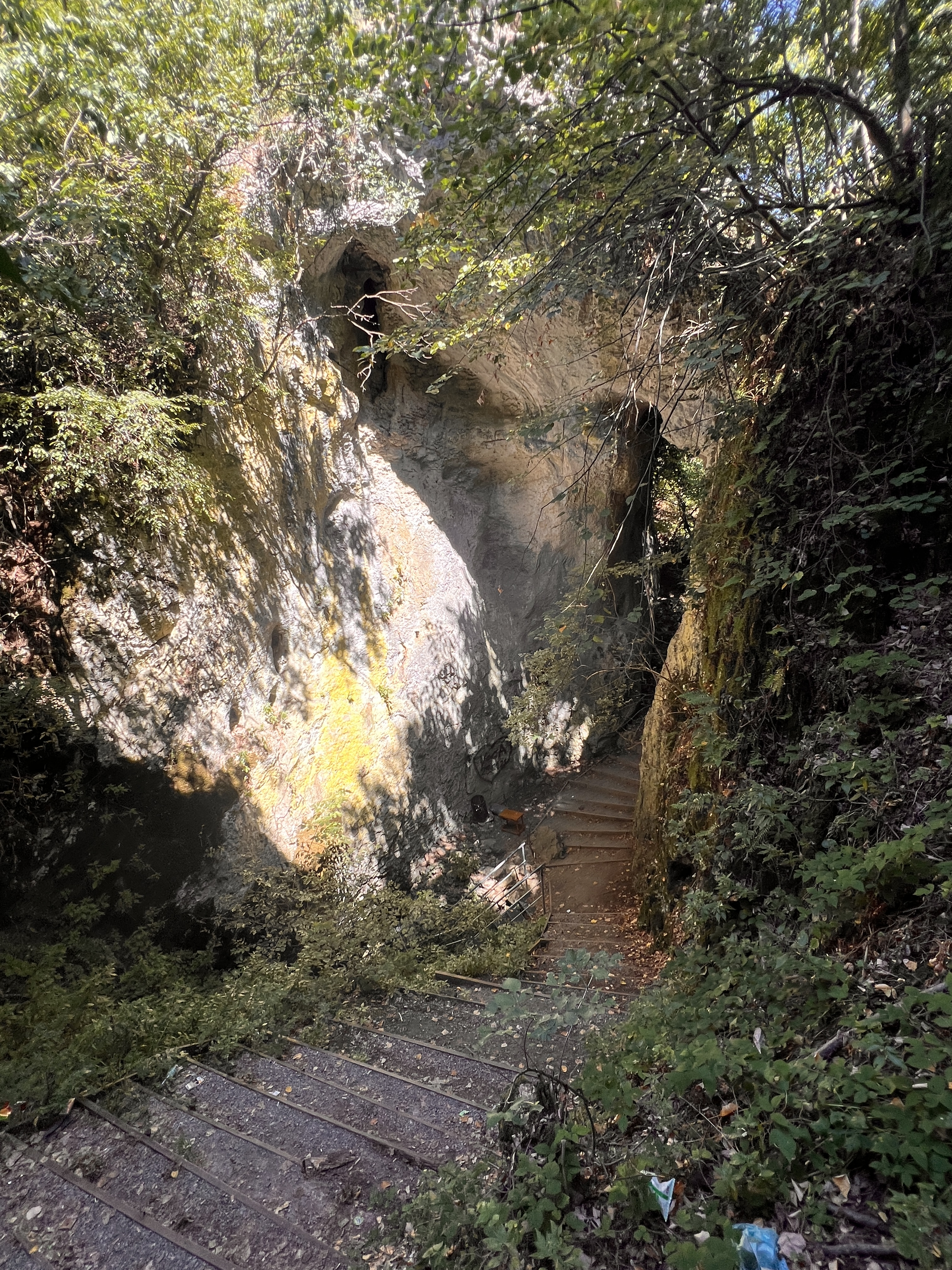
- Entrance down to the cave in 2025.

- Location within Kosovo Location within Europe
- Interactive map of Kusari Cave
- Location: Municipality of Gjakova , Kosovo
- Coordinates: 42.319733°N 20.44725°E

Kusari Cave (Albanian: Shpella e Kusarit; Serbian: Kusari pećina) is a karstic limestone cave in southwestern Kosovo. It is located in the hamlet of Kusari in the municipality of Gjakova, close to the Albanian border.

It is a "natural monument" according to the IUCN category III.

== Description ==
The Kusari cave is located about 9 km from Gjakova city and 1 km from the hamlet of Kusar (or Kusari), on the right side of the road linking the latter with the hamlet of Goden. It is situated in a mountainous terrain of karst rocks, at the foot of the Pashtrik Mountains and lies at 501 meters above sea level.

The cave features a rectangular courtyard of about 22 by 10 m, surrounded by high rock walls, and two main cave chambers. One chamber is shallow and narrow, around 11 m long, 1.2–2.6 m wide, and 2.2–3 m high. The other is longer and wider: about 20 m long and 2–3 m wide. Both are filled with layers of soil, stones, and soot.

== History ==
The cave bears traces of early habitation. Fragments of prehistoric pottery vessels dating back to the Chalcolithic period were found in the cave, as well as other evidence of human habitation in the 1st to 3rd centuries AD were found.

From around 2022 to 2024, the municipality of Gjakova made investments in order to make the cave more accessible and develop the touristic potential of the site.

In 2025, the cave, along with three other caves, was featured on a series of postage stamps by the Kosovo Post, in cooperation with the Kosovo Institute for Nature Protection.

== Gallery ==
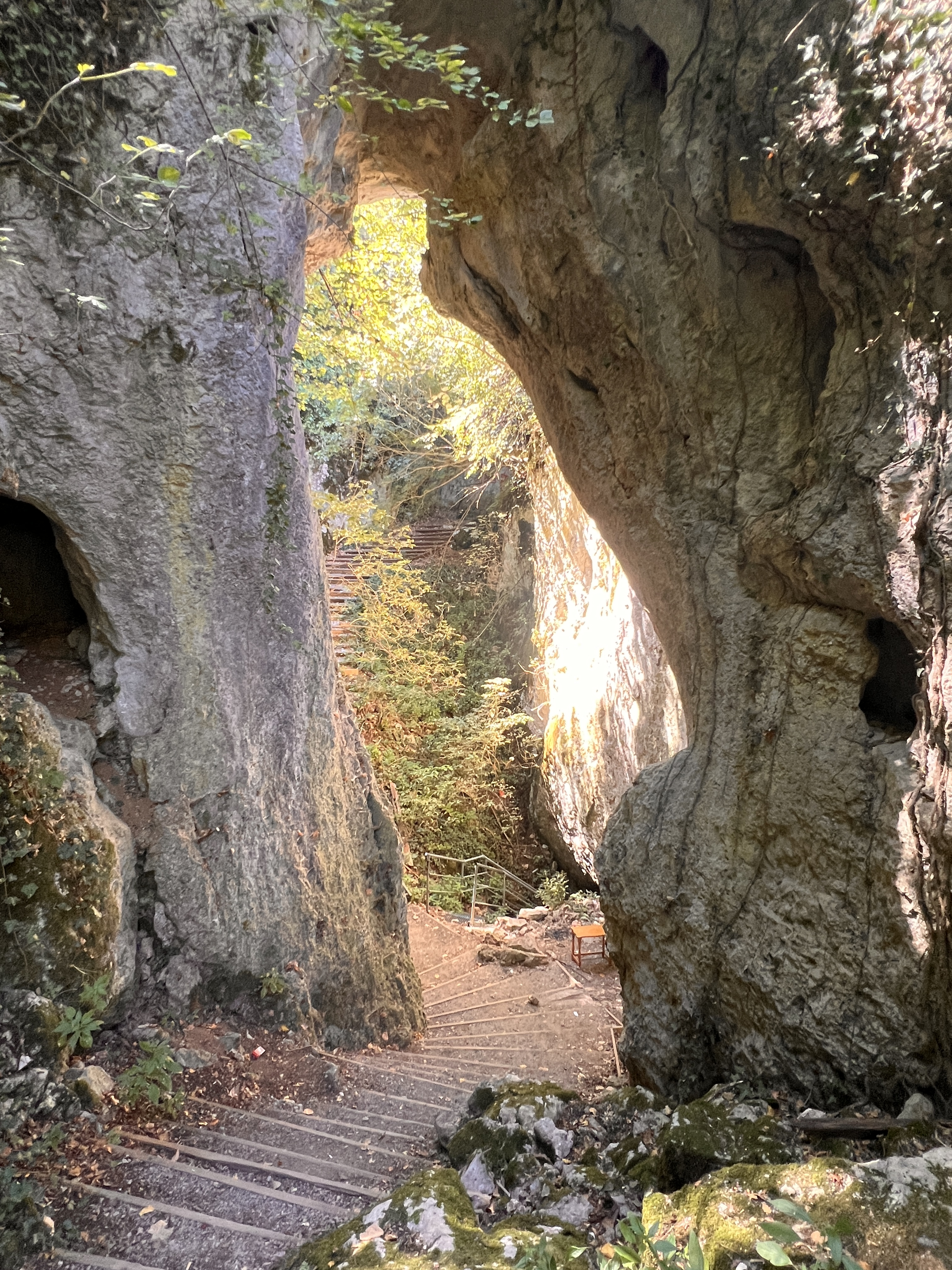
Another view of the stairs down the entrance to the cave.

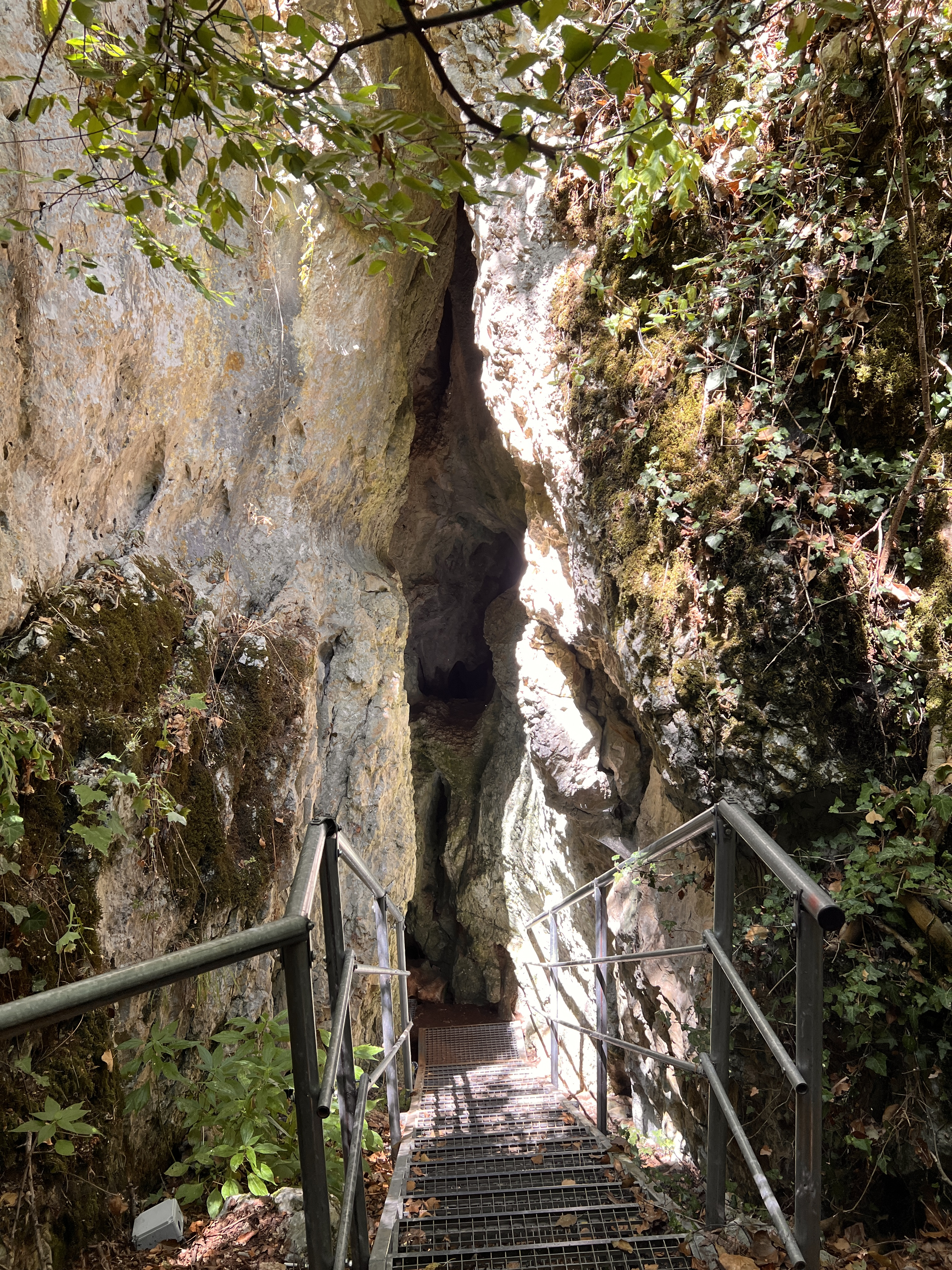
The entrance.

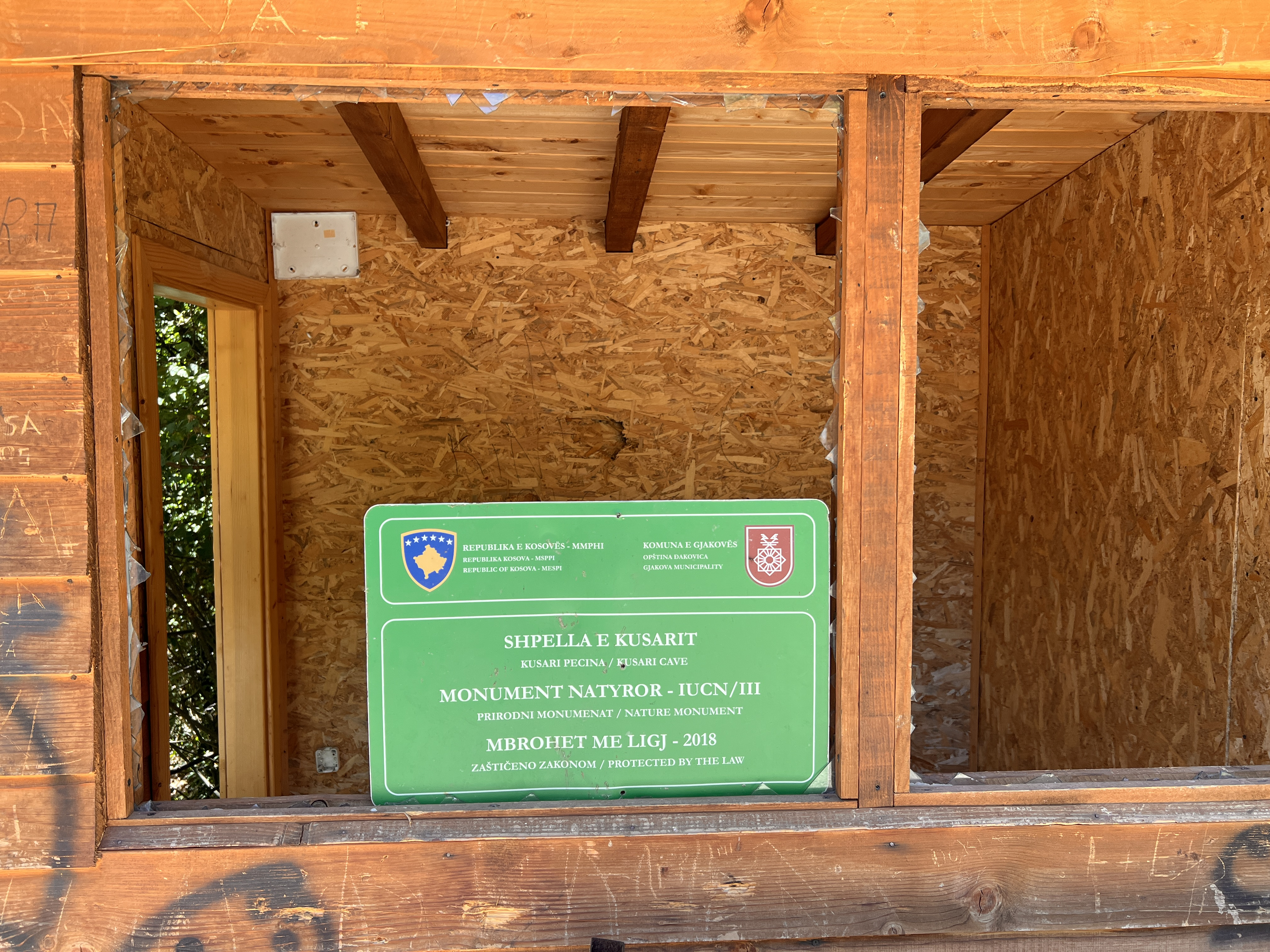
The booth at the beginning of the stairs.

== See also ==
- Marble Cave, Kosovo
- Bukuroshja e Fjetur Cave
