= Marble Cave, Kosovo =

Cave in Kosovo

Marble Cave
- Shpella e Mermerit / Gadimes (Albanian)
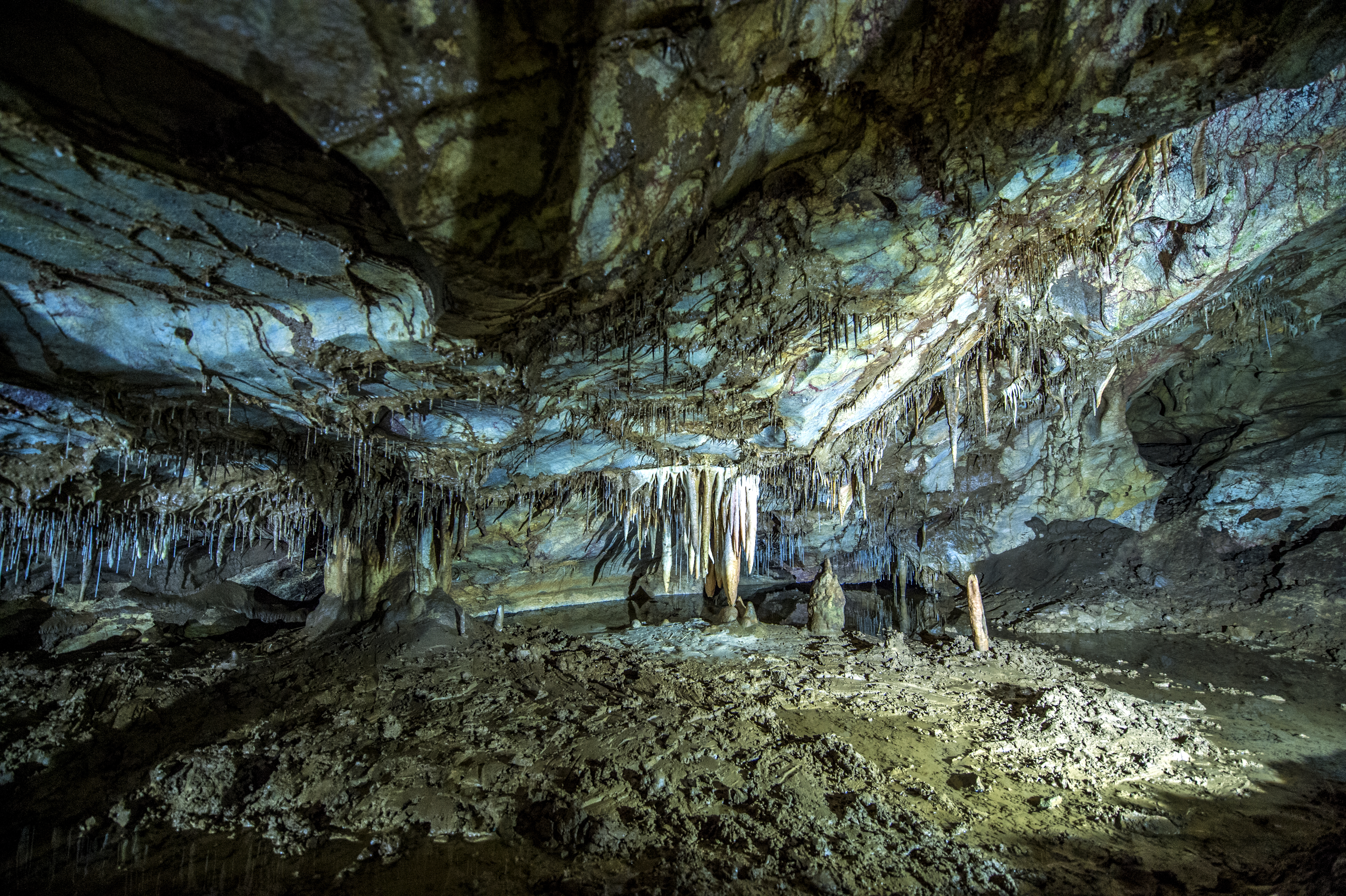

- Location within Kosovo Location within Europe
- Location: Gadime e Ulët, Kosovo
- Coordinates: 42.48006°N 21.205538°E
- Discovery: 1966
- Geology: Karst limestone

The Marble Cave or the Gadime Cave (Albanian: Shpella e Mermerit; Serbian: Мермерна пећина/Mermerna pećina) is a karstic limestone cave in the village of Gadime e Ulët in the municipality of Lipjan in Kosovo. Much of it is still unexplored. The cave was found in 1966 by a villager, Ahmet Asllani, who was working on his garden.

== Overview ==
Gadime Cave is located within the marble limestones belonging to the Mesozoic era. The cave was formed during the tertiary period. In course of time the marble was subjected to cracking as a result of tectonic erosions.

The entrance to the cave is in two directions. The lower direction is relatively complicated and consists of 3 transverse channels, 2 parallel and curved corridors. The upper direction consists of two combined corridors. The total length of the cave is 1.260 m and its area is 56.25 ha.

== Gallery ==
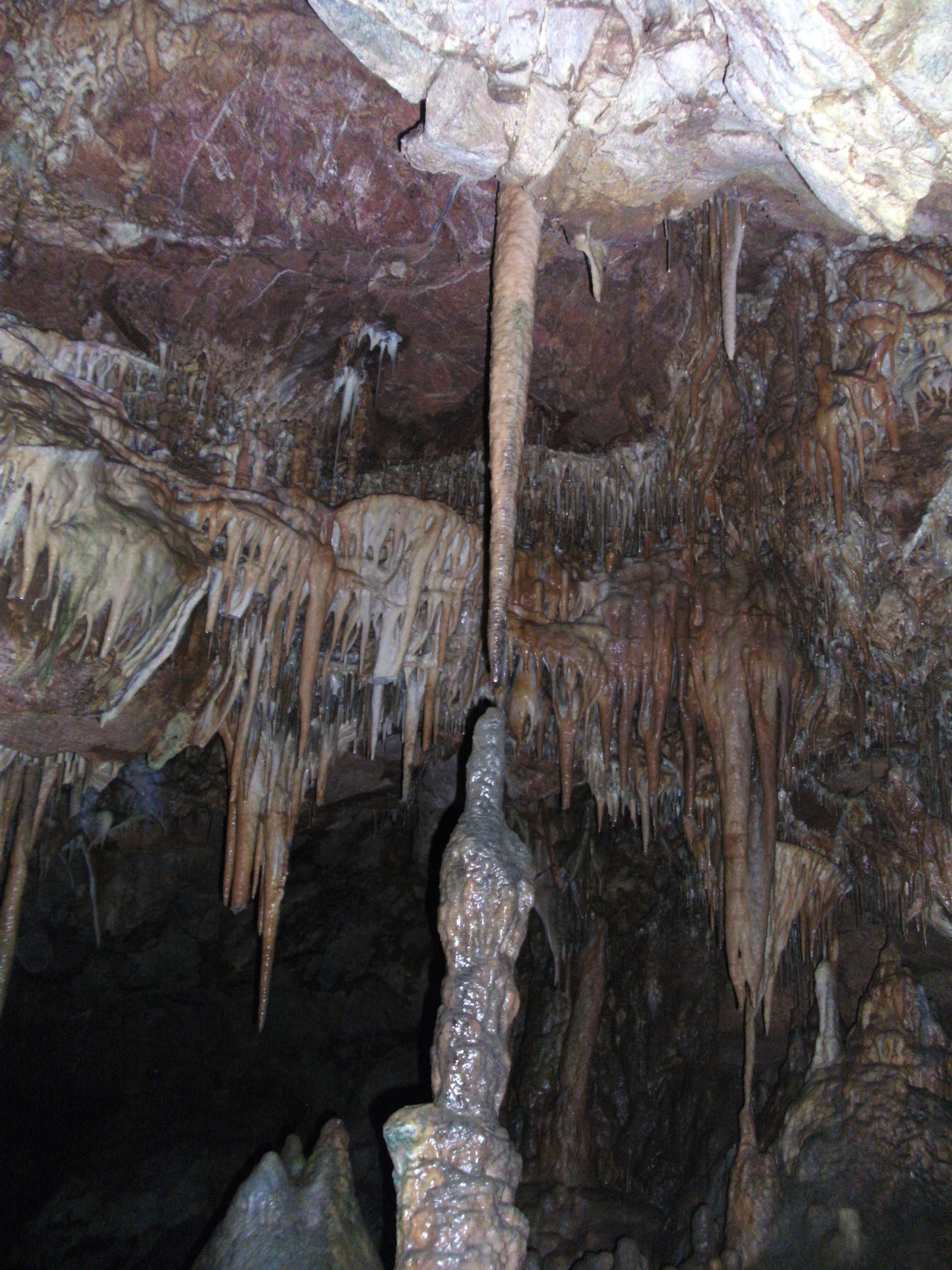

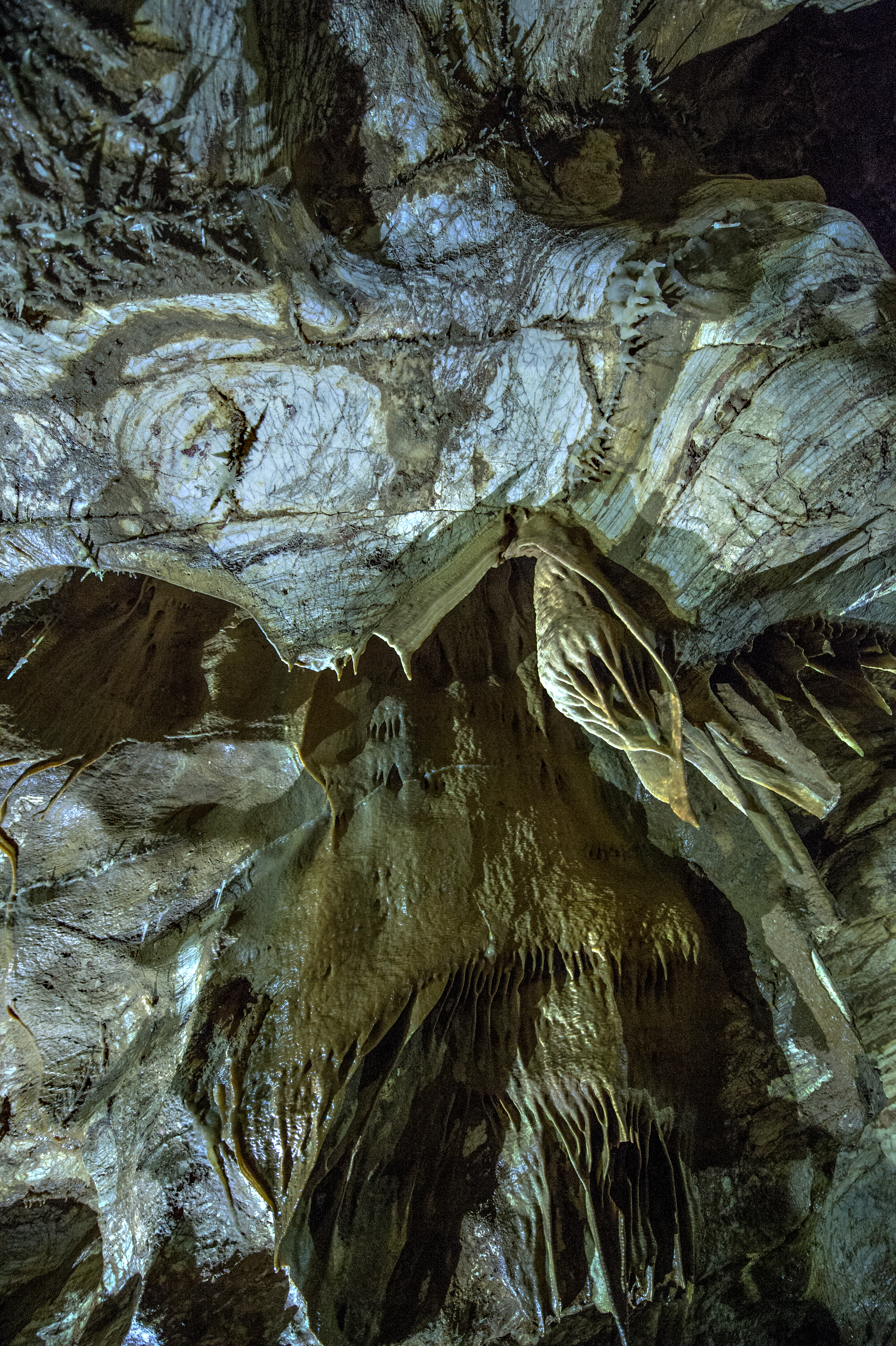

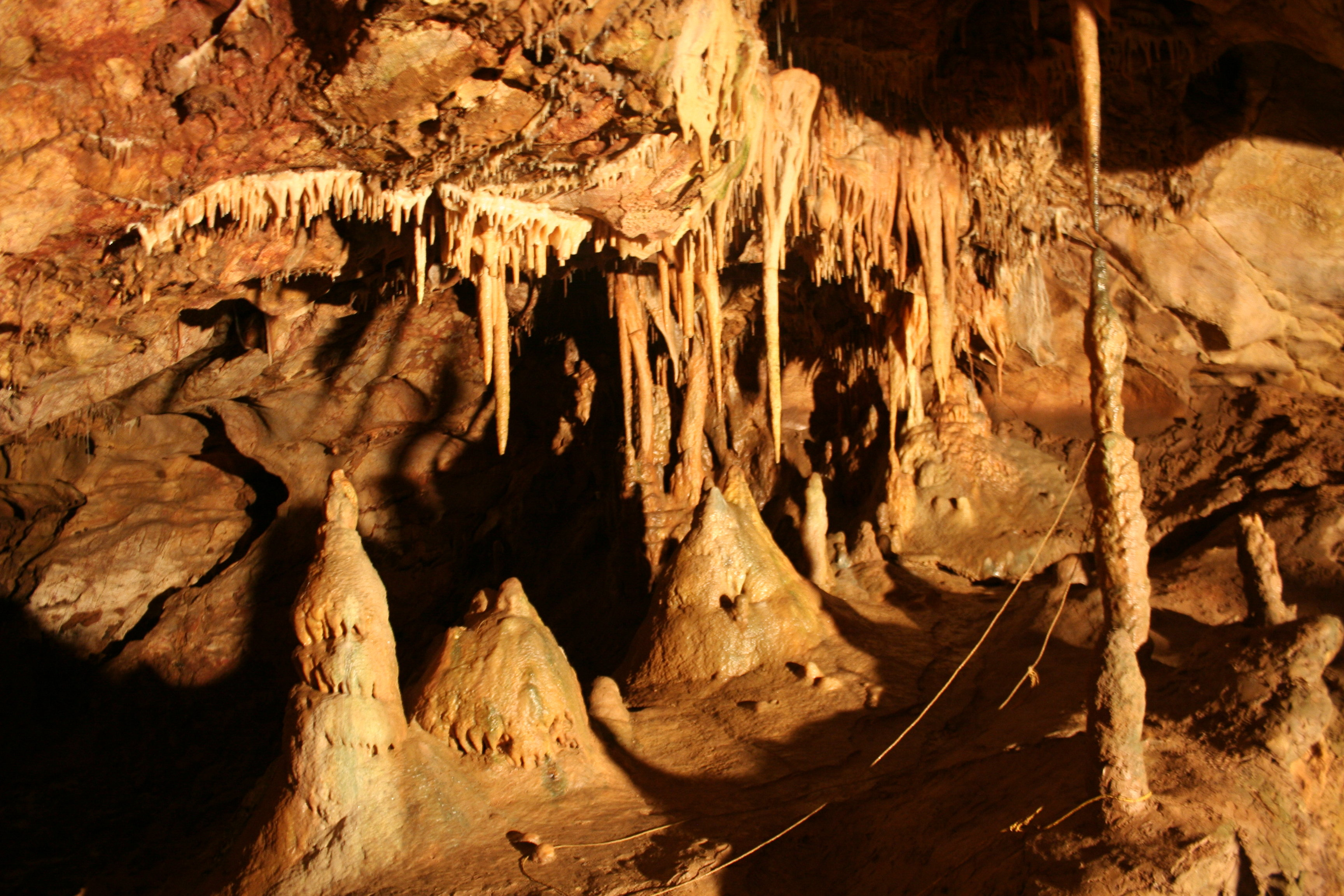

== See also ==
- Bukuroshja e Fjetur Cave
- Kusari Cave
