= Bukuroshja e Fjetur Cave =

Cave in Kosovo

- Radac Cave; Sleeping Beauty Cave
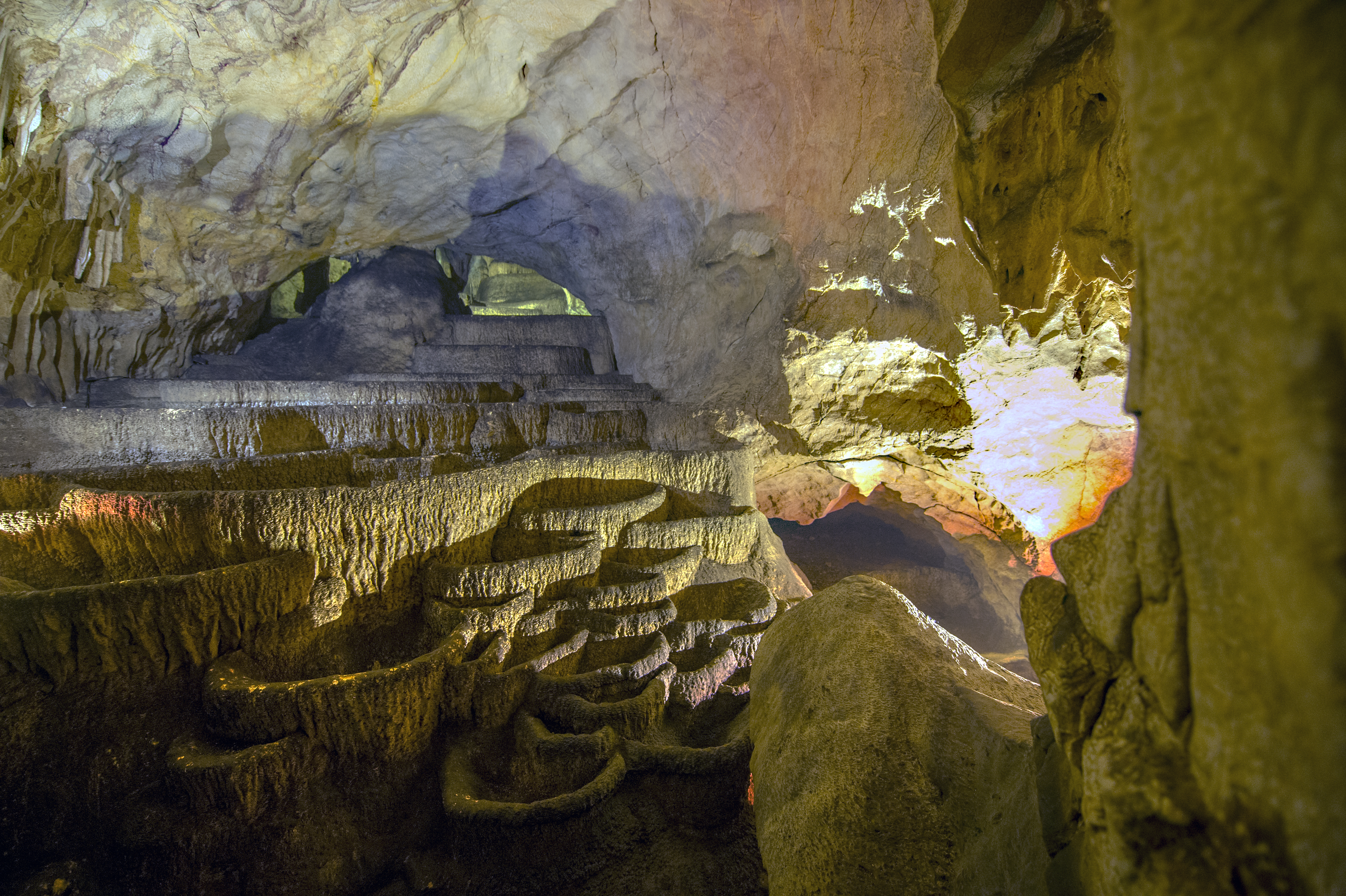
- Bukuroshja e Fjetur Cave

- Location within Kosovo Location within Europe
- Interactive map of Bukuroshja e Fjetur Cave
- Location: Radac, Peja, Kosovo
- Coordinates: 42°44′13″N 20°18′23″E
- Discovery: 1968
- Visitors: 23,000

The Bukuroshja e Fjetur Cave (Albanian: Shpella e Bukuroshes së Fjetur) or Radac Cave (Albanian: Shpella e Radacit), also known as Sleeping Beauty Cave, is a cave located in the village of Radac, Peja, Kosovo. Around 11 kilometers from the town of Peja, the cave is found to the left of the Peja-Rozaje Road in the Accursed Mountains.

== Overview ==
The Bukuroshja e Fjetur Cave was first discovered in 1968. Archaeologists are currently examining Neolithic human remains, dating back six thousand years, discovered within the cave. Alongside these findings, a bullet from World War I and a man's pipe from the same era were also uncovered. Local stories suggest the potential presence of evidence related to World War II soldiers in the cave.

== See also ==
- Kusari Cave
- Marble Cave, Kosovo
