= Gjakova =

Sixth-largest city in Kosovo

Gjakova: Gjakova or Gjakovë (Albanian) Đakovica or Ђаковица (Serbian)
- City and municipality
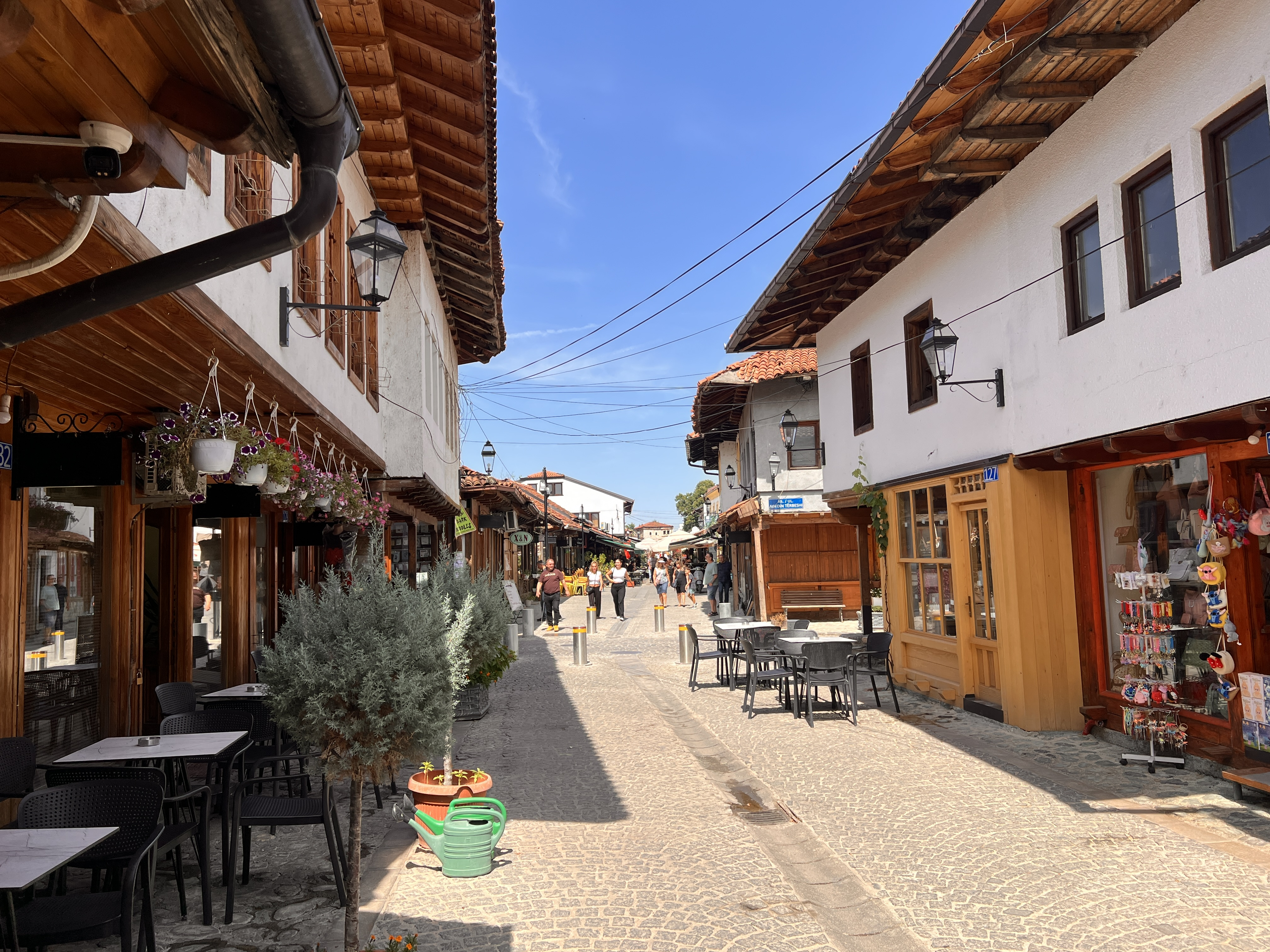
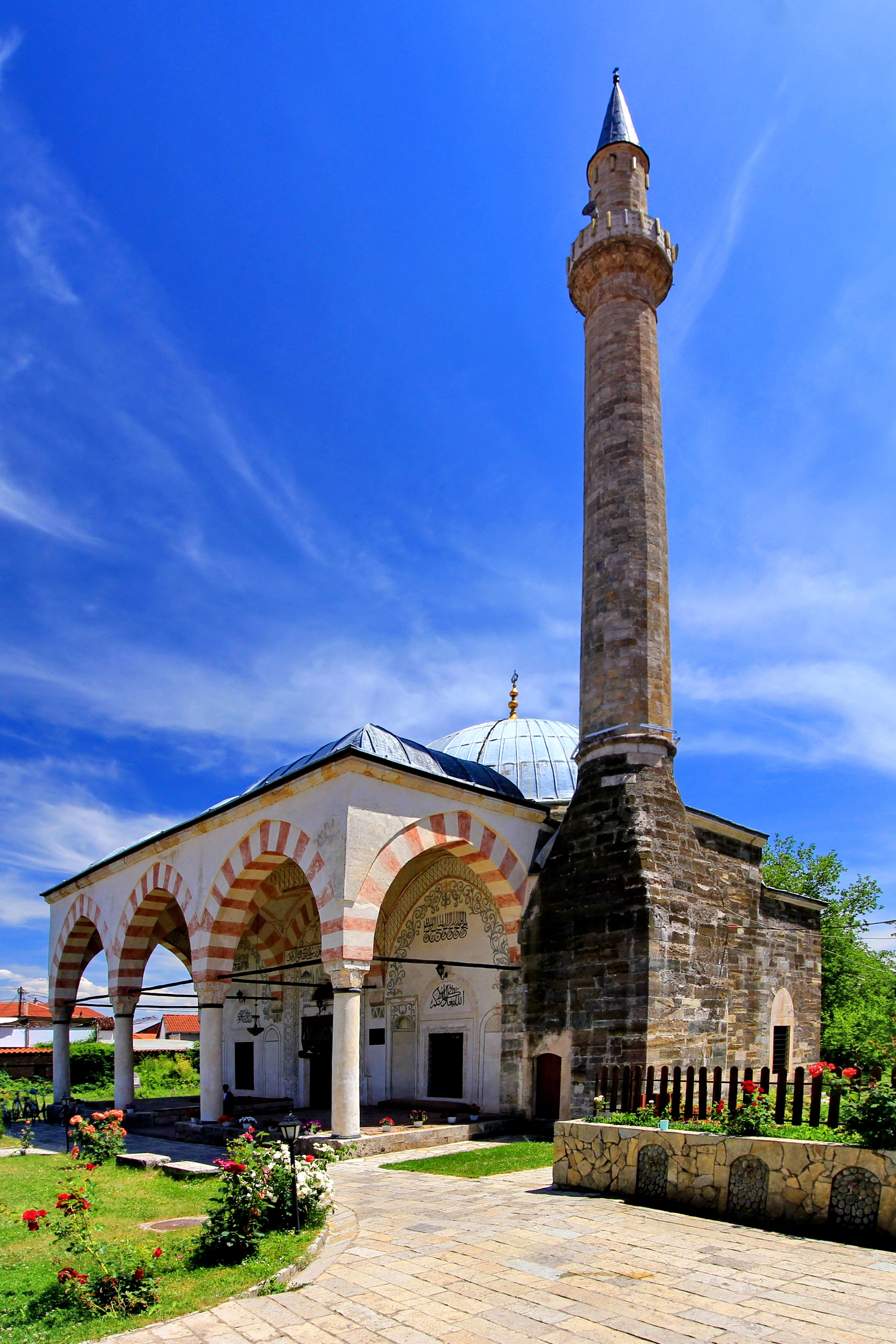
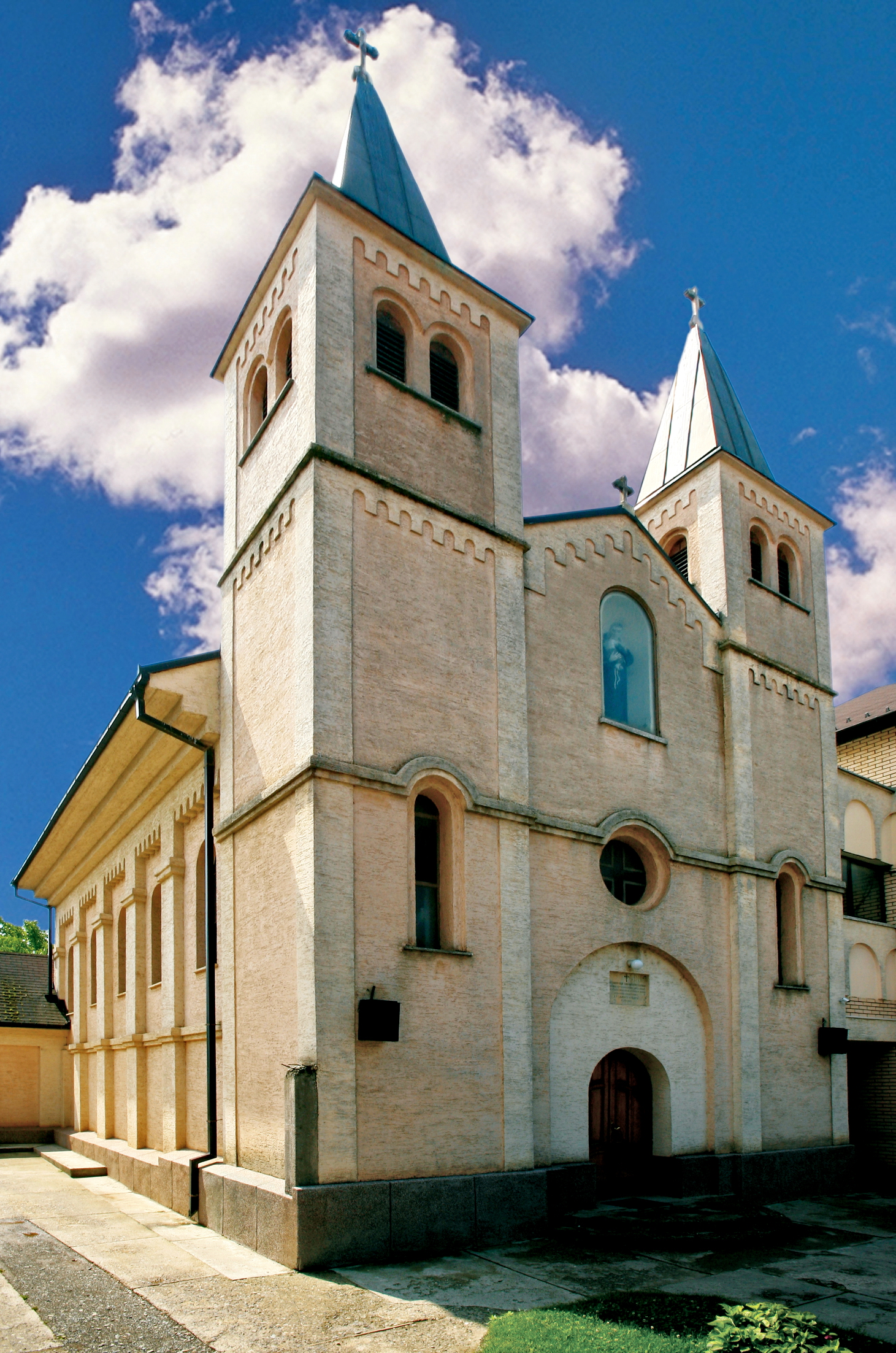
- View of the city Old Bazaar Clock Tower Church of St. Paul and St. Peter Hadum Mosque Saint Anthony's Church Ethnographic Museum Museum of History

- Flag Seal
- Interactive map of Gjakova
- Location within Kosovo
- Coordinates: 42°23′N 20°26′E
- Country: Kosovo
- District: Gjakova
- Municipality: Gjakova

Government
  - Mayor: Ardian Gjini (AAK)

Area
  - Municipality: 586.91 km^{2} (226.61 sq mi)
  - Rank: 4th in Kosovo
- Elevation: 375 m (1,230 ft)

Population (2024)
  - Municipality: 78,699
  - Rank: 6th in Kosovo
  - Density: 134.09/km^{2} (347.29/sq mi)
  - Urban: 41,809
- Demonym(s): Albanian: Gjakovar (m), Gjakovare (f)
- Time zone: UTC+1 (CET)
  - Summer (DST): UTC+2 (CEST)
- Postal code: 50000
- Area code: +383 390
- Vehicle registration: 07

Gjakova (pronounced [ɟakova]), Gjakovë or Đakovica (Serbian Cyrillic: Ђаковица, pronounced [ˈdʑakoʋitsa]) (Note: Gjakova is known as Gjakovë (Albanian definite form: Gjakova, pronounced [ɟaˈkovə]) and Đakovica.) is the sixth-largest city in Kosovo and seat of the Gjakova Municipality and the Gjakova District. According to the 2024 census, the municipality of Gjakova has 78,699 inhabitants.

Geographically, Gjakova lies in the south-western part of Kosovo, approximately midway between the cities of Peja and Prizren. It is approximately 100 kilometres (62 mi) inland from the Adriatic Sea. The city is situated some 208 kilometres (129 mi) north-east of Tirana, 145 kilometres (90 mi) north-west of Skopje, 80 kilometres (50 mi) west of the capital Pristina, 435 kilometres (270 mi) south of Belgrade and 263 kilometres (163 mi) east of Podgorica.

Gjakova has been inhabited since prehistoric times. During the Ottoman period, it emerged as a key trading hub along the route connecting Shkodra and Constantinople. At its peak, Gjakova was regarded as one of the most advanced commercial centres in the Balkans.

== Etymology ==
The city's Albanian name is Gjakova. Several theories exist regarding the origin of the village name, including derivation from the personal name Jakov (a variant of Jacob), the Serbian word đak meaning “pupil,” or the Albanian word gjak, meaning “blood.”

The "Jakov theory" derives its name from Jakov, a little-known nobleman in the service of lord Vuk Branković who founded and ruled the city, and whose coins have been found, signed "Jakov". According to local Albanians, the name was derived from the name Jak (Jakov), with the village name meaning "Jakov's field".

== History ==
=== Ottoman Period ===
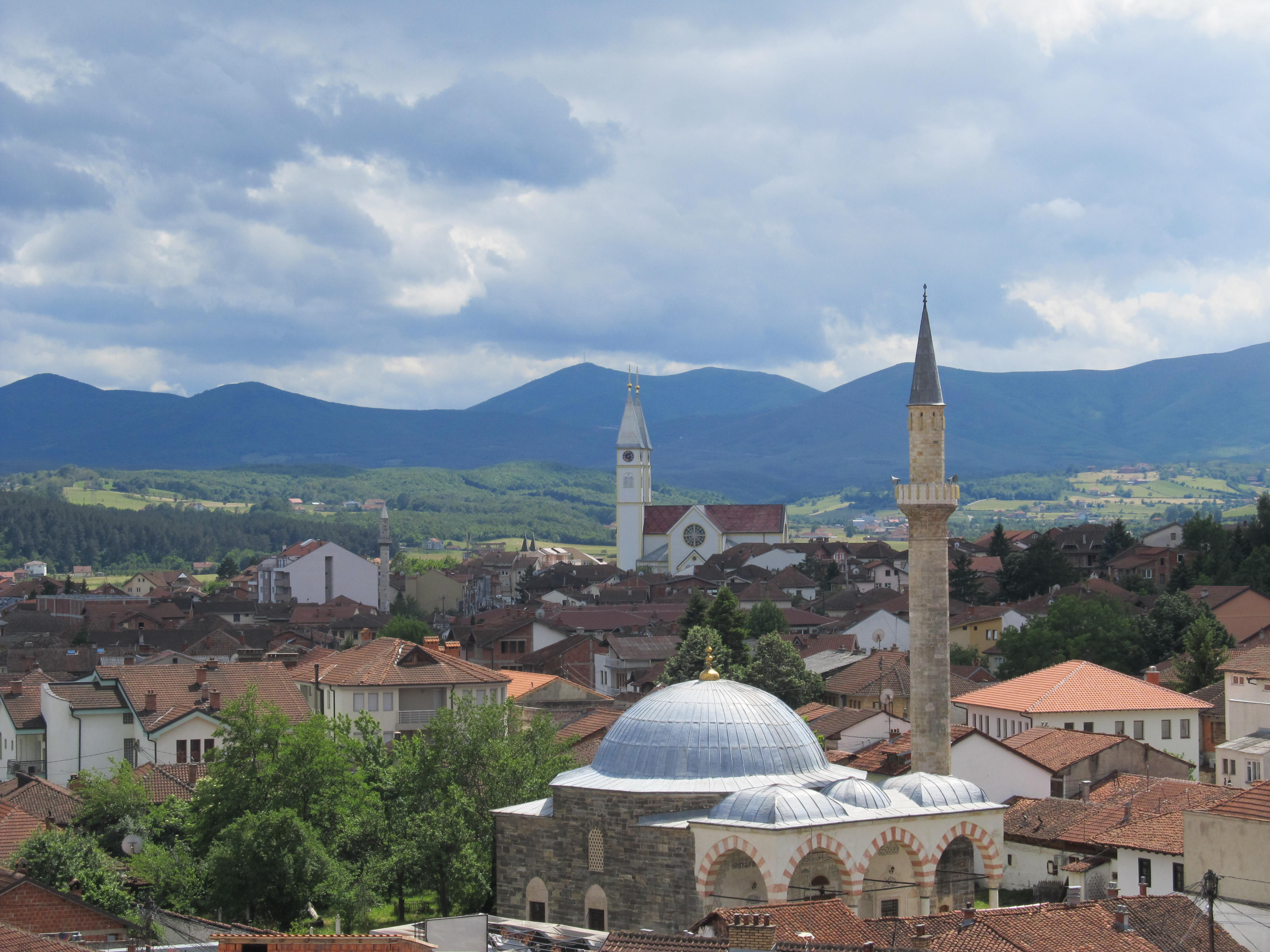
The Hadum Mosque and St. Paul Church characterise the historical city centre.

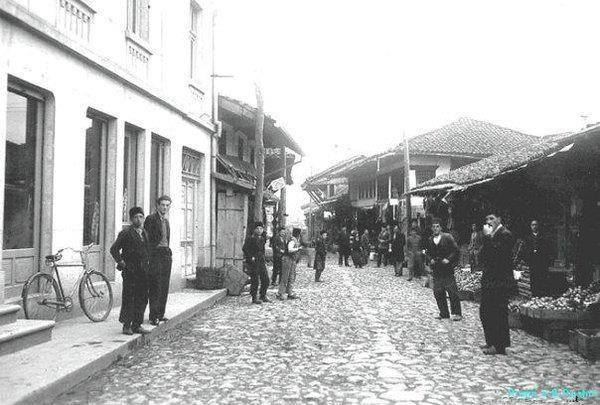
The Old Bazaar in Gjakova is the oldest one in Kosovo and was the heart of the economy in the city.

Gjakova was mentioned as a village with a market in the 1485 Ottoman defter, and had 54 households. The local Albanians developed it into a town in the 16th century. It has been a settlement with an ethnic Albanian majority since its foundation, having grown around the founding structures built by Hadim Suleyman Efendi, a politically important local Albanian. Edith Durham noted that Gjakova was founded by members of the Albanian Mërturi tribe in the 15th and 16th centuries, specifically by the families of two men descended from Bitush Mërturi—Vula and Mërtur. The descendants of the Vula family were still present during the time of her visit to Albania in the first decade of the 20th century.

In the Ottoman defter (tax registry) of 1485, Gjakova was a village with 67 households. In the 17th century, Katip Çelebi and Evliya Çelebi mention this place as Jakovičse, with 2,000 houses and 300 shops. During the early period of Ottoman rule, Gjakova and the Gjakova Municipality were part of the Nahiya of Altun-ili. Most of the villages in the Nahiya of Altun-ili, along with the villages between Gjakova and Prizren were dominated by inhabitants with Albanian anthroponomy. This is seen by Selami Pulaha as an indication that during the 15th century (as supported by Ottoman defters), the lands between Junik and Gjakova were inhabited by a dominant ethnic Albanian majority. In the 1571 and 1591 Ottoman defters, the majority of the inhabitants of Gjakova as a settlement itself were recorded with Albanian anthroponomy; Albanian onomastics prevailed over Slavic onomastics.

In the year 1638, the Archbishop of Bar, Gjergj Bardhi, reported that Gjakova had 320 Muslim homes, 20 Catholic homes and 20 Orthodox homes, and wrote that the region is inhabited by Albanians and that the Albanian language is spoken there.

The city had developed into an Ottoman trade centre on the Shkodra–Istanbul route, with the marketplace being by the Hadum Mosque, built in 1594 by Mimar Sinan, financed by Hadum Aga. Evliya Çelebi mentioned it as a city in 1662, and described it as a flourishing and attractive town with 2,000 houses built of stone with roofs and gardens. The public buildings were situated on a broad plain and included two richly adorned congregational mosques, several prayer-houses, some inns with leaden roofs, a delightful bath-house (hamam), and about 300 shops like nightingale-nests. Between 3–6 September 1878, heavy fighting took place in Gjakovë between the nationalist Albanian League of Prizren and the Ottoman Empire. In the ensuing fight, 280 Ottoman soldiers were killed, including 2 Pashas, and a further 300 were wounded.

In May 1845, following Mustafa Reşid Pasha's outlawing of the right to bear arms, 2,000 rebels from the Gjakova region, and the Gjakova Highlander tribes of Krasniqi, Gashi and Bytyçi rose in revolt. The rebels, about 8,000 men, drove the Ottoman garrison out of Gjakova. The Ottomans suppressed the rebellion, but did not succeed in establishing effective control of the region.

In 1862 the Ottomans sent Maxharr Pasha with 12 divisions to implement the Tanzimat Reforms in the Highlands of Gjakova. Under the leadership of Mic Sokoli and Binak Alia, the tribes of Krasniqi, Gashi, Bytyçi and Nikaj-Mertur organised a resistance near Bujan. The rebels were reinforced by the forces of Shala, led by Mark Lula. After heavy fighting, they managed to defeat the Ottoman force and expel them from the highlands.

Local Albanian leaders, such as Sulejman Aga of Botushë, organised resistance and movements for independence against the Ottomans throughout the 19th-20th centuries; in one such uprising, 5,000-6,000 Albanian fighters led by Sulejman Aga Batusha, gathered outside of Gjakova and attacked the garrison in an attempt to enter the city. In 1904, 10 Ottoman battalions accompanied by artillery were sent to Gjakova in order to quell the uprising. Shemsi Pasha and the Ottomans were then ordered to estimate the livestock possessions and to enforce heavy taxes upon the local Albanians in response to the uprising, and the hostilities were accompanied by the forcible collection of taxes from the local population and the destruction of entire villages in the Gjakova region by Ottoman forces; Upon arriving to Botusha, Shemsi Pasha, with five battalions and numerous artillery pieces, began bombarding the houses. The Ottomans were met by 300 Albanian resistance fighters led by Sulejman Aga Batusha. The resistance fighters had 35 dead or wounded, but the Ottomans lost more than 80 soldiers. Another 300 Albanian fighters arrived and surrounded the Ottoman force but could not yet finish them as the Ottomans were numerically superior and were positioned well with cannons. 2,000 Albanian tribesmen would eventually gather to fight the Turks, and the Ottoman government sent 18 more battalions accompanied by artillery to quell this new uprising; Shkup's Vali, Shakir Pasha, also went to Gjakova. A series of ensuing battles followed in the Gjakova region, resulting in the deaths of more than 900 Ottoman soldiers as well as 2 bimbashis and a dozen officers, whereas the Albanians suffered only 170 dead or wounded. Shakir Pasha was thereby ordered to stand down.

=== Modern Period ===
Gjakova suffered greatly from the Serbian and Montenegrin armies during the First Balkan War. The New York Times reported in 1912, citing Austro-Hungarian sources, that people on the gallows hanged on both sides of the road, and that the way to Gjakova became a "gallows alley." In the region of Gjakova, the Montenegrin military police formed the Royal Gendarmerie Corps (Kraljevski žandarmerijski kor), known as krilaši, which committed much abuse and violence against the non-Orthodox Christian population. The mass hanging of Albanian civilians in 1914 by the Serbo-Montenegrin army and the killing of Catholic priest Luigj Palaj were some of the most reported wartime events which took place in Gjakova.

Serbian priests forcibly converted Albanian Catholics to Serbian Orthodoxy. According to a 20 March 1913 Neue Freie Presse article, Orthodox priests and the military converted 300 Gjakova Catholics to the Orthodox faith; Franciscan Pater Angelus, who refused to renounce his faith, was tortured and killed with bayonets. The History Institute in Pristina reported that Montenegro converted over 1,700 Albanian Catholics to the Serbian Orthodox faith in the Gjakova region in March 1913. Albert von Mensdorff-Pouilly-Dietrichstein told Edward Grey in a 10 March 1912 interview that Serbian soldiers behaved in a "barbarous way" toward Muslim and Catholic Albanians in Gjakova. During World War II, when Kosovo was made a part of Greater Albania under Italian rule and later under German control, Serbs were persecuted by Albanian paramilitaries. A large number of killings of Serbs took place in 1941 in the district of Gjakova.

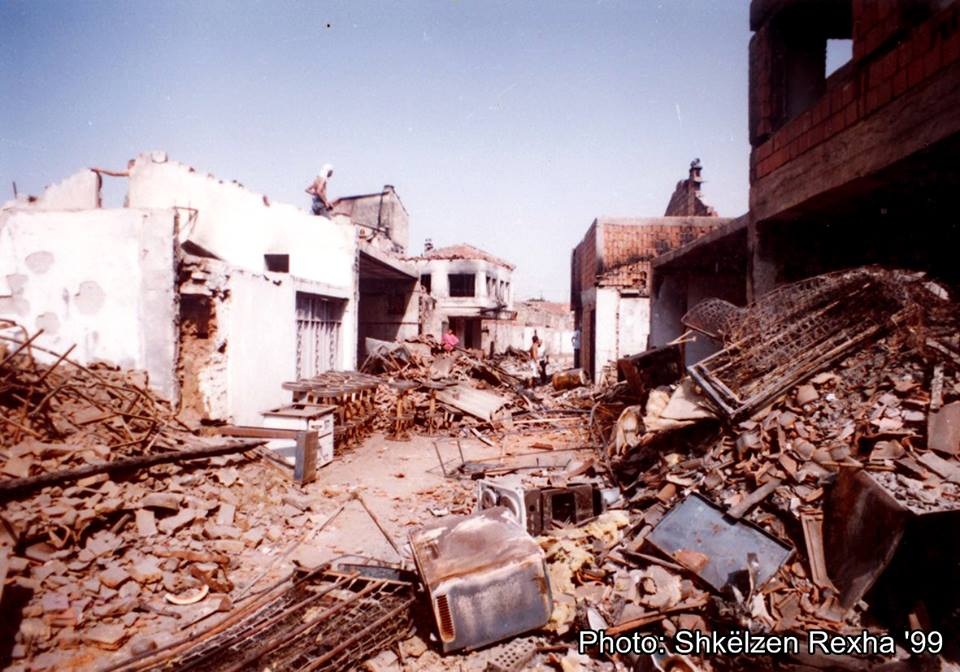
Old Bazaar after the Kosovo War in 1999

In 1953–56, a systemic campaign of police repression was conducted throughout Kosovo with the goal to force Albanians to leave the region. The first protest against the Yugoslav police which involved the unfurling of the banned Albanian national flag was held in Gjakova on May Day, 1956. This protest was soon followed by other protests which involved high school and university students who unfurled the Albanian flag in Yugoslavia. A total of 19 Albanians were assassinated by the Yugoslav secret police in Gjakova in these events.

In the events of the dissolution of Yugoslavia, the Union of Independent Trade Unions of Kosova (BSPK) was created in 1990. BSPK's members took pride in their large grassroots participation which reached 14,900 workers. The BSPK founding congress was held in Gjakova and despite gaining a permission to be legally held, the police broke it up during its second day. The city was badly affected by the Kosovo War, suffering great physical destruction and large-scale human losses and human rights abuses. In the rural locality of Meja, just 4 km outside Gjakova's city centre, the mass killing of at least 377 Albanian males between the ages of 16 and 60 took place on April 27, 1999, by the Serbian police. It is the largest massacre of the Kosovo War. Many of the bodies of the victims were found in the Batajnica mass graves. The International Criminal Tribunal for the former Yugoslavia has convicted several Serbian army and police officers for their involvement. Actions on the ground had a devastating effect on the city. According to the ICTY, OSCE, and international human rights organisations, about 75% of the population was expelled by Serbian police and paramilitaries as well as Yugoslav forces, while many civilians were killed in the process. Large areas of the city were destroyed, chiefly through arson and looting but also in the course of localised fighting between government security forces and members of the KLA.

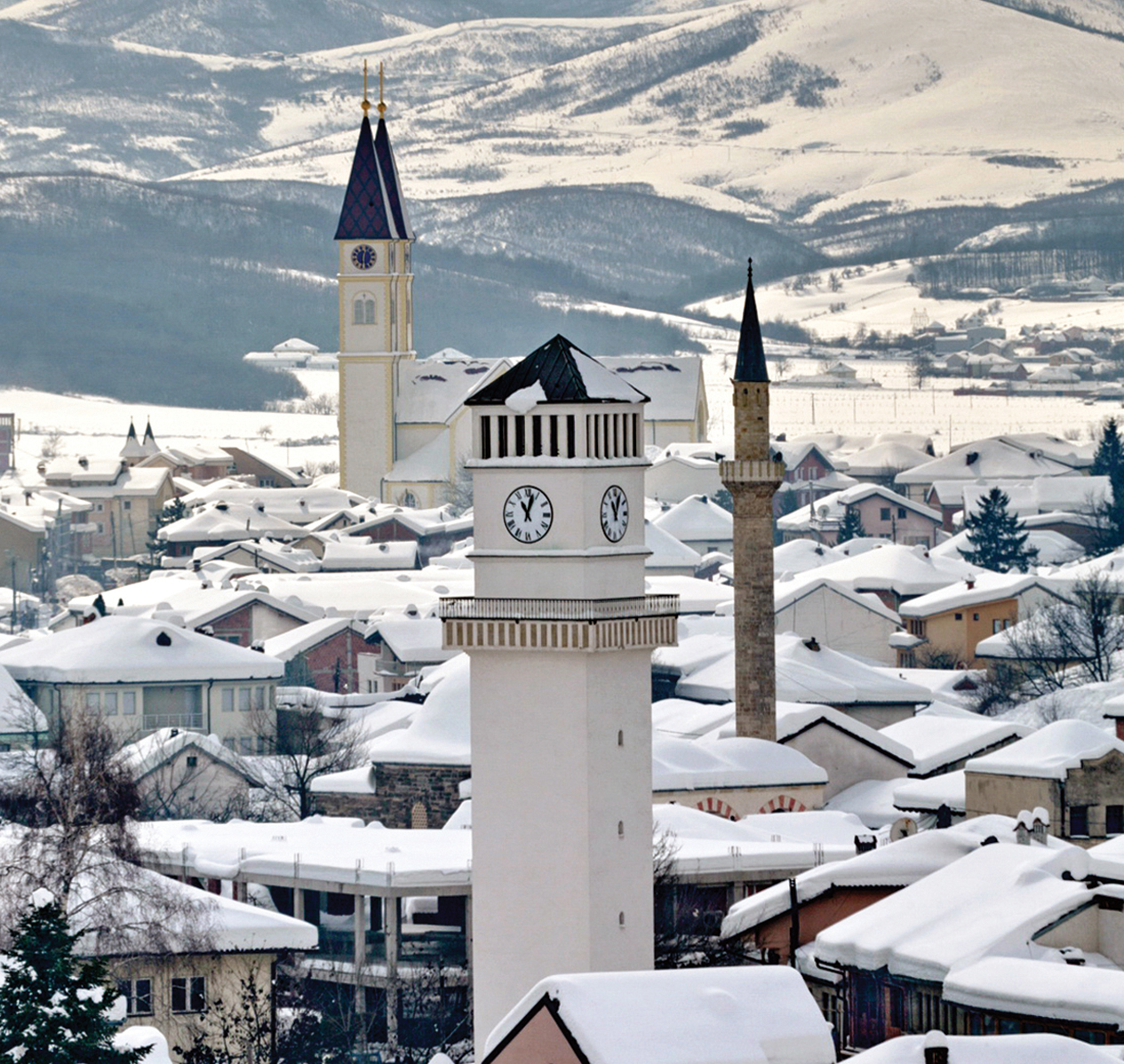
After the war in Kosovo, the Clock Tower of Gjakova was restored, though in a style different from the original tower.

The actions of the government forces in Gjakova formed a major part of the United Nations war crimes indictment of the then-President Slobodan Milošević. Yugoslav units were stationed in and near the city in two barracks due to the risk of an attack by the Kosovo Liberation Army (KLA) from across the border in Albania. In one incident, NATO aircraft misidentified a convoy of Albanian refugees and attacked it.

Most of the Albanian population returned following the end of the war. After that much of the town was rebuilt. Many Albanians viewed the Roma population as participants in war crimes and collaborators in acts of state repression. The Romani neighbourhood of Gjakova (Brekoc) was targeted and parts of it burnt down in mid-1999, about 600 Roma were moved to a refugee camp outside the town and as a result of political violence 15 were reportedly killed or missing by August 1999. The majority of the Serbian population, numbering 3,000, fled Gjakova in June 1999 with only five Serbs remaining, living under guard by KFOR troops at a local Serbian Orthodox Church. In 2004, the last five remaining Serbs were expelled from Gjakova with the local Serbian Orthodox Church being destroyed by ethnic Albanians during rioting as part of the March unrest in Kosovo. About 15 Serbs had returned to Gjakova by the 2011 census.

== Geography ==
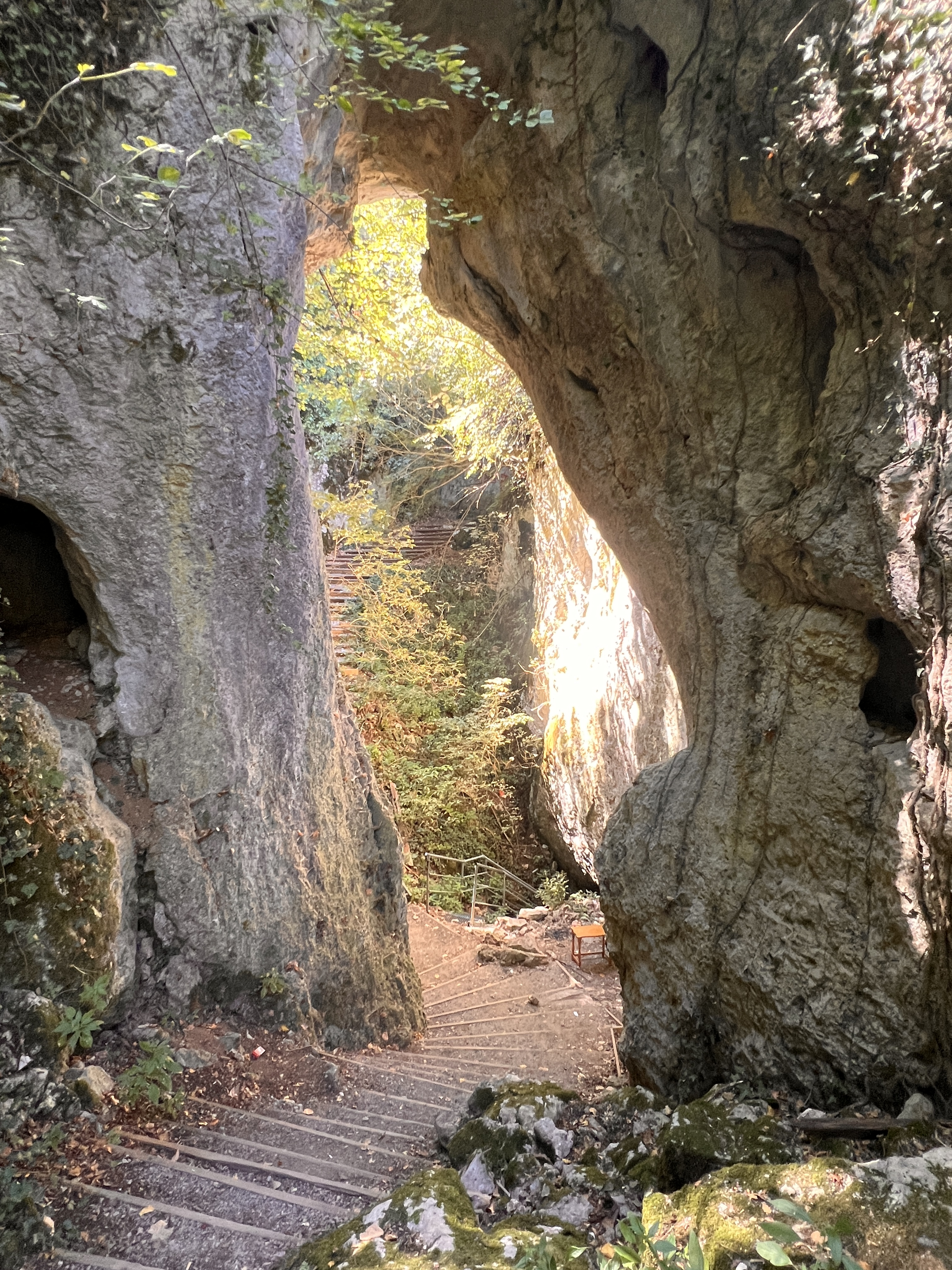
Kusari Cave is located 9 km from Gjakova city.

Gjakova is located in the south-western part of Kosovo. To the north-east of the city, the west Kosovan plain of Metohija opens, while in the south-west the peak of Accursed Mountains rises. The city is also situated at the entrance to the Erenik Valley, where the river Krena flows from the north to the Erenik mountain stream. After a few kilometres, it flows into the White Drin, the longest river in Kosovo. To the west of Gjakova lie the Gjakova Highlands, and to the north-east of the city is the Dushkaja region.

Kusari Cave, a natural monument, is located on the territory of the municipality of Gjakova.

=== Climate ===
Gjakova has a Humid subtropical climate (Cfa) as of the Köppen climate classification with an average annual temperature of 11.5 °C (52.7 °F). The warmest month in Gjakova is August with an average temperature of 22.5 °C (72.5 °F), while the coldest month is January with an average temperature of 0.7 °C (33.3 °F).

== Demographics ==
Historical population
Year	Pop.	±% p.a.
1948	15,190	—
1953	17,065	+2.36%
1961	21,368	+2.85%
1971	31,281	+3.88%
1981	42,031	+3.00%
1991	59,008	+3.45%
2011	40,827	−1.82%
2024	41,809	+0.18%
Source: Kosovo Agency of Statistics

According to the 2024 census, the total population of the municipality is 78,824, of which 39,288 (49.84%) are males and 39,536 (50.16%) are females.

According to the 2011 census, the resident population was 94,556, of which urban inhabitants numbered 40,827 and rural 53,729; there were 47,226 males and 47,330 females. The ethnic groups include Albanians (87,672), Balkan Egyptians (5,117), Roma (738), Ashkali (613), and smaller numbers of Bosniaks (73), Serbs (17), Turks (16), Gorani (13) and others. Based on those that answered, the religious make-up was 77,299 Muslims, 16,296 Roman Catholics, 22 Orthodox Christians, 142 others, and 129 irreligious. Based on the population estimates from the Kosovo Agency of Statistics in 2016, the municipality has 95,433 inhabitants. According to OSCE estimations, before the Kosovo War of 1999 the municipality had a population of about 145,000, of which 93% were Kosovo Albanians and 7% non-majority communities, including some 3,000 Serbs, who mostly lived in Gjakova itself.

In 2021 Dragica Gasic, the first Serb returnee since the end of the Kosovo War in 1999 returned to her former apartment in Gjakova. Despite being legally allowed to return to her property by the Kosovo Property Agency, her return was marred by threats of violence and harassment from her ethnic-Albanian neighbours.

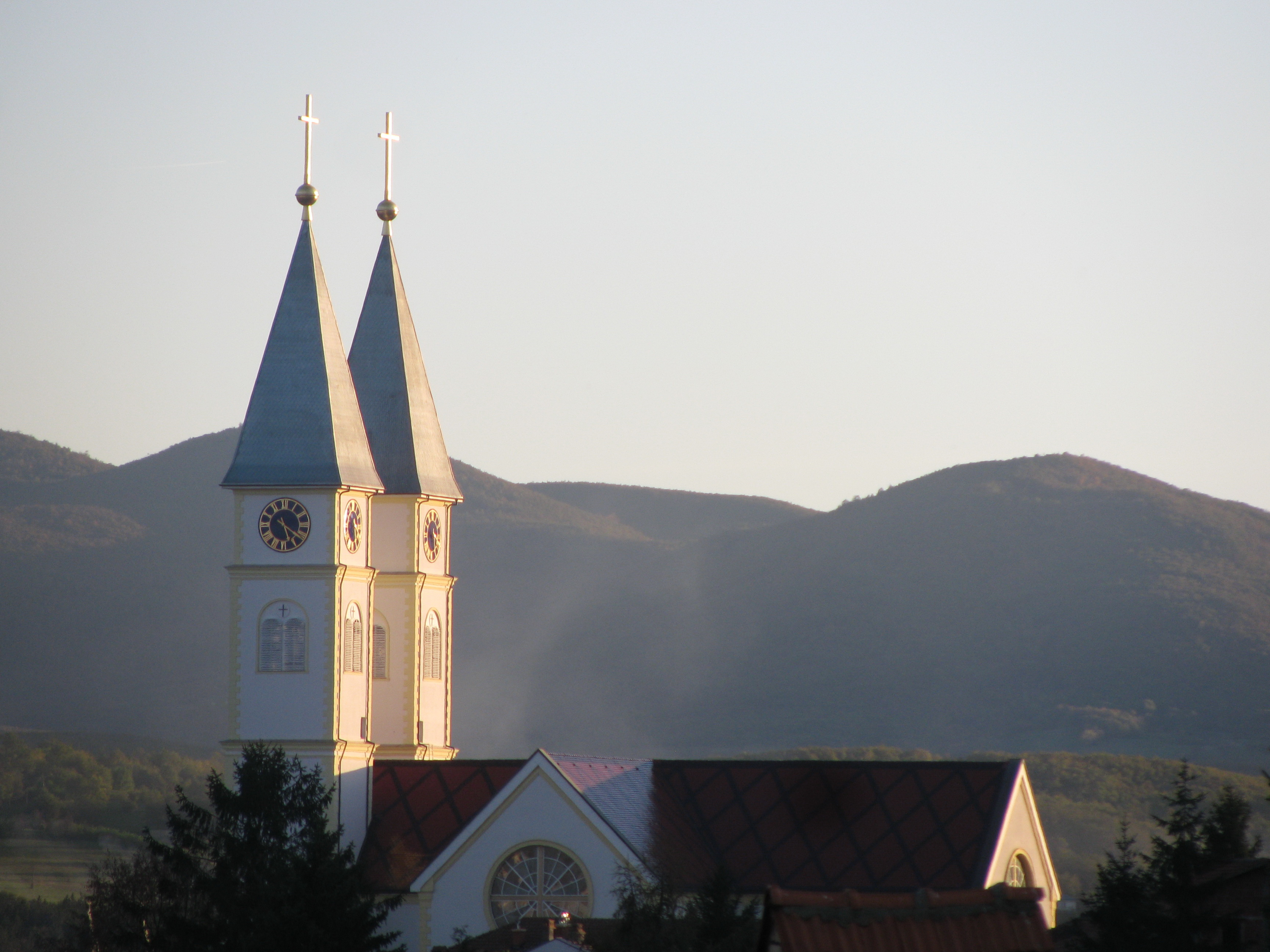
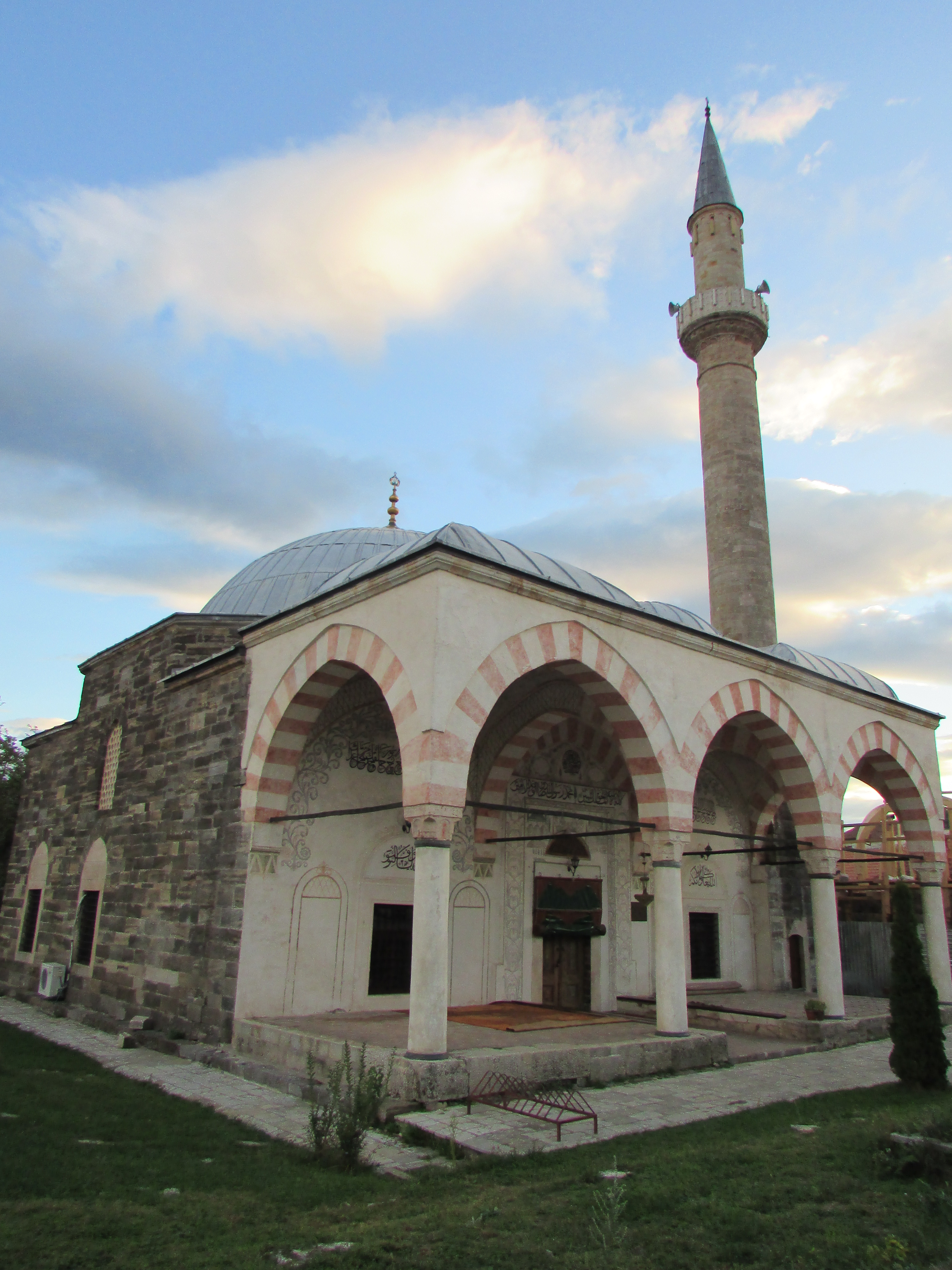
Gjakova is characterised by two Catholic Churches and Mosques, which are part of the cultural heritage of the city.

Kosovo does not have an official religion. As the rest of the country, the majority of Gjakova's population consider themselves Muslim. The minority of Gjakova's religious population that is not Muslim practices Christianity in the form of Roman Catholicism and Eastern Orthodoxy. According to the census of 2011, the prominent religion is Islam, including 81.75% of the population, while 17.23% is Roman Catholic Christian, 0.02% Orthodox Christian and 1% other. Religious communities have educational institutions for their needs organised in accordance with applicable law.

Christianity has been around in Gjakova for a long time, going back all the way to the time of the Roman Empire. Islam in Gjakova began to be spread very early, during the Ottoman Rule.

Most Catholics live in the Rruga e Katolikëve street, where the two main churches are, and others in villages. The Muslims, living in other parts of the city and in most villages, have been encouraging the building of mosques, which could have counted about 10–15 buildings during the centuries.

== Economy ==
Gjakova's economy initially developed around farming, agriculture, small-scale trade, and manufacturing workshops that primarily produced goods for local needs and supplemented imports. Following World War II, the city shifted towards an economy driven by industry and agriculture, with an emerging service sector. Today, these transitions reflect broader structural changes typical of societies in economic transformation. Gjakova's current economic framework rests on two pillars: the private business sector and the social business sector, the latter undergoing privatisation. The private sector is expanding rapidly and is now considered the principal component of the city's economy.

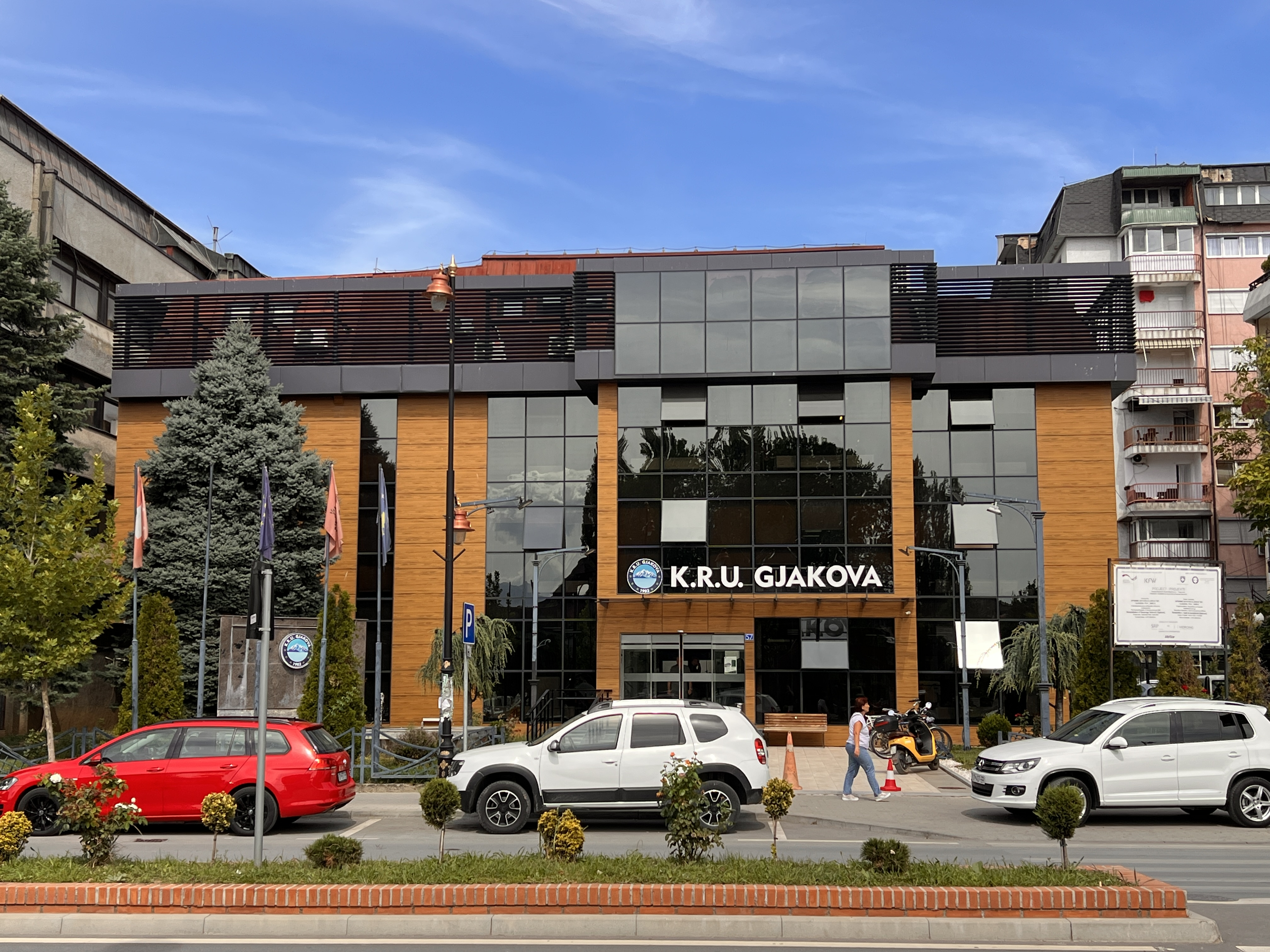
Main building of Kompania Rajonale e Ujësjellësit (KRU) Gjakova, the regional water supply company of Gjakova.

According to official data, Gjakova has experienced significant growth in small and medium-sized enterprises (SMEs). In 2006, there were 581 registered SMEs; by 2008, this number had risen to 3,120, and by 2012 it reached 4,120. Currently, around 12,000 people are employed in both public and private sectors, with the majority working in the latter. Despite persistently high unemployment, employment levels have shown gradual improvement over the years. Data from the Kosovo Ministry of Work and Social Wellbeing indicate that the number of registered unemployed fell from 40,000 in 2010 to 30,000 in 2011 and further to 15,000 in 2012. Additionally, approximately 30,000 residents receive social assistance, including low-income families, individuals with disabilities, families of war veterans and victims, and retirees.

Potential industry sectors in the municipality of Gjakova are:

- Metal industry, which produces metal ropes, nails, galvanised pipes, profiles of metal adhesive bandages. The existing industry also the production of electro motors for washing machines, engines for industrial applications, motors for hermetic compressors, finger jointed and Teflon containers, chimneys, elbows, enamelled pots, technical gases, and chrome concentrate.
- Textile industry, which produced cotton spinning, cotton fabrics, artificial leather, underwear, lingerie costume for men, and different types of fabric (specifically jeans), etc.
- Chemical industry, involves production of the shampoo for domestic and industrial use and other chemical products which are used for household hygiene.
- Food industry, is mainly known with the production of flour, bread, eggs, pasta, chocolate, high quality wines, and fresh meat.
- Construction industry, Gjakova is also known for its construction materials industry, which involves the production of bricks, blocks, tiles, doors and windows, briquette, wooden cottages in the global level (log Houses ) and also the production of asphalt, fresh concrete, concrete slabs, and concrete pipes.

The municipal budget of Gjakova was subsidised by donations from USAID, CDF, Austrian Office in Kosovo, the European Commission and others, which over the past four years have done capital investments to the amount of €25 million: €5.4 m in 2010; €6.3 m in 2011; €6.7 m in 2012; €6.6 m in 2013.

Capital investments in the municipality of Gjakova are primarily directed towards road infrastructure, including rehabilitation, paving, and partial installation of street lighting. However, funding for the expansion of the sewage network and improvements to canalisation remains insufficient. The municipality allocates over €6 million annually for capital investment projects.

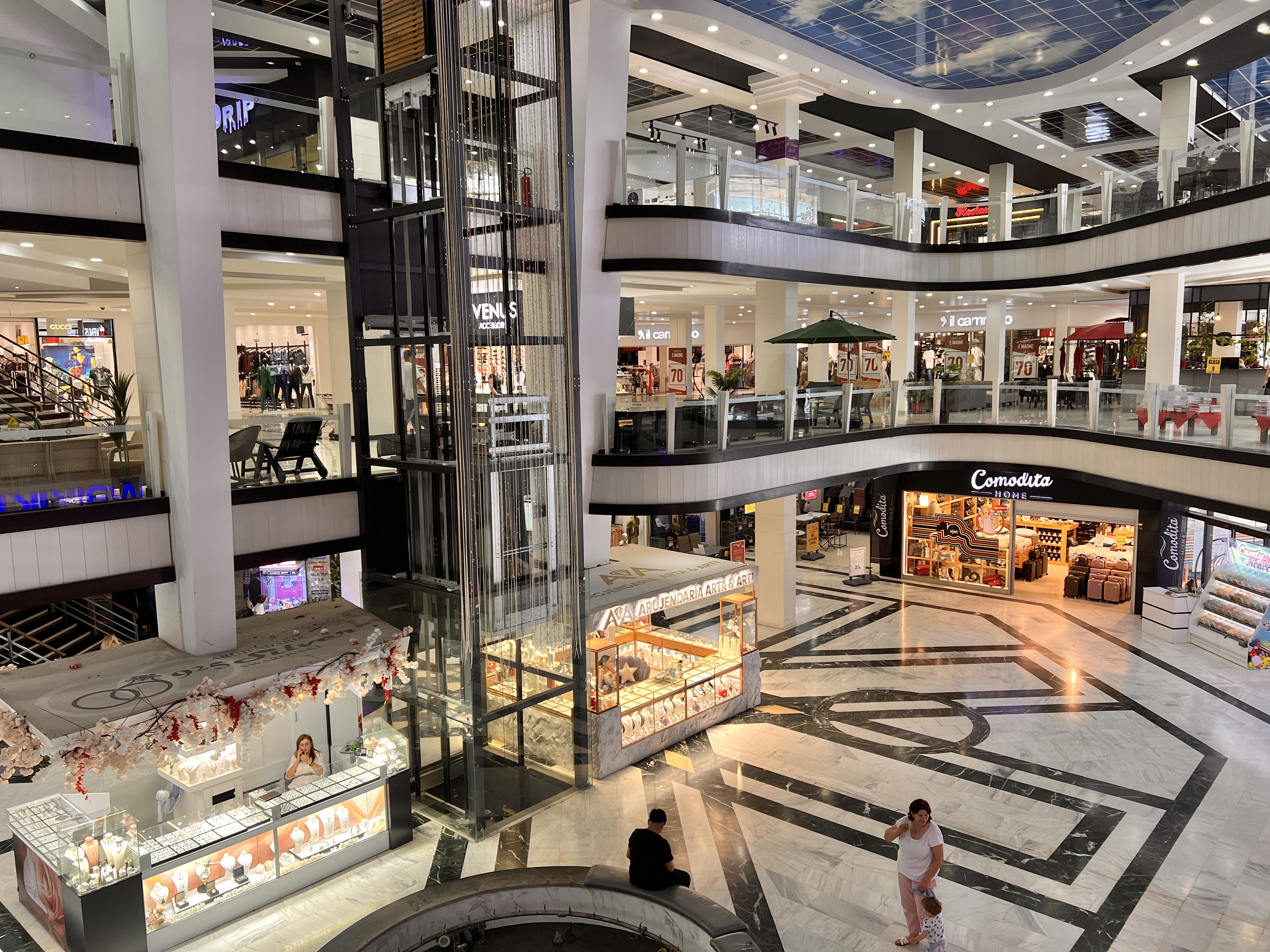
Nertili shopping centre in Gjakova.

Gjakova's private sector remains relatively weak and is dominated by small family-owned businesses, retail shops, cafés, and providers of basic services. It accounts for only 5.5% of all registered businesses in Kosovo. According to the local Tax Administration Office, between 88% and 93% of active businesses are sole proprietorships, 5–10% are limited liability companies, and only about 2% are large enterprises. As in other parts of Kosovo, more than 90% of businesses are small family-run operations with limited capacity to generate added value. A study of 53 businesses in Gjakova's city centre revealed that only two had no family members employed.

Most private businesses employ between one and five people and operate in low value-added sectors such as wholesale and retail trade or service activities like restaurants and hotels. Wholesale and retail account for 50.5% of registered businesses, followed by hotels and restaurants (10.2%), manufacturing (9.7%), transport and communications (7.8%), construction (4.2%), and agriculture (1.7%).

Outside the city centre, the private sector includes former socially-owned enterprises. Of the 15 privatised ventures and two joint-stock companies, only two are fully operational—both in construction. “Dukagjini,” employing 109 people, is among the largest private employers in Gjakova, while “NIKI-S,” with 279 employees, is currently the biggest company in the municipality.

== Education ==
Gjakova has a long tradition of education since the beginning of civil life. According to the Gjakova tradition the Hadim Aga library was so rich in books so it was said "Who wants to see the Kaaba, let them visit the library of Hadim Aga". The library had a reading room on the ground floor and the shelf with books upstairs.

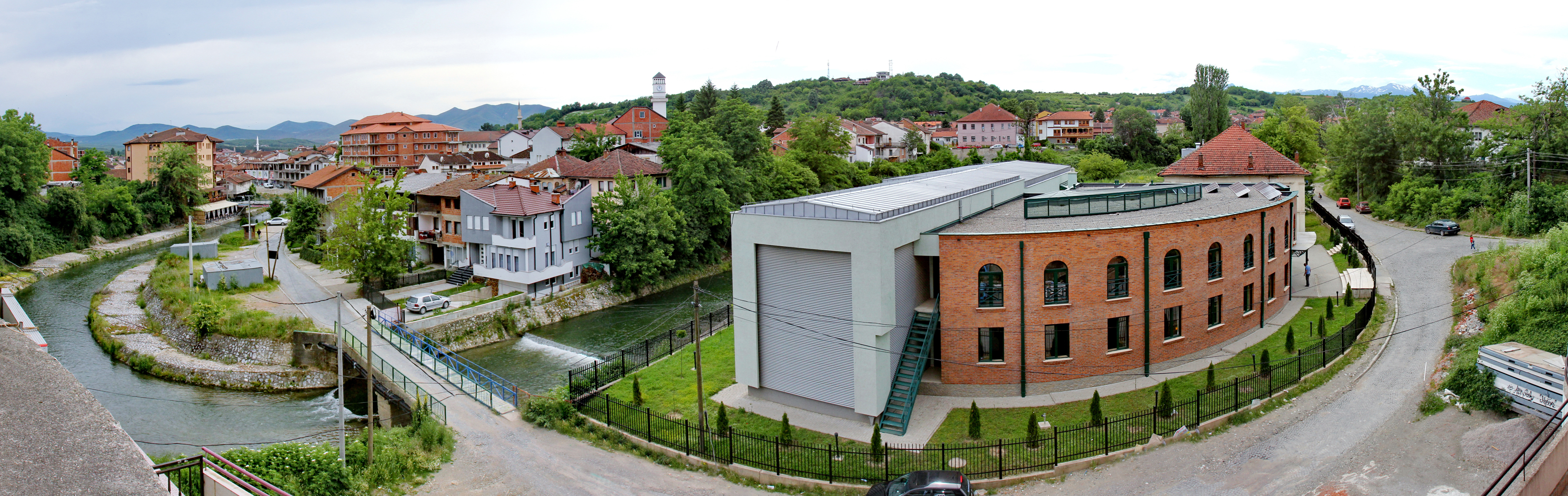
Prenk Jakova School of Music in Gjakova

According to some data, schools with Albanian as a language of instruction in the territory of Gjakova were opened before 1840. The Albanian intellectuals from the city, that were educated in the most important educational centres of the Ottoman Empire, had a special role in opening of schools in Albanian during the Albanian National Movement.

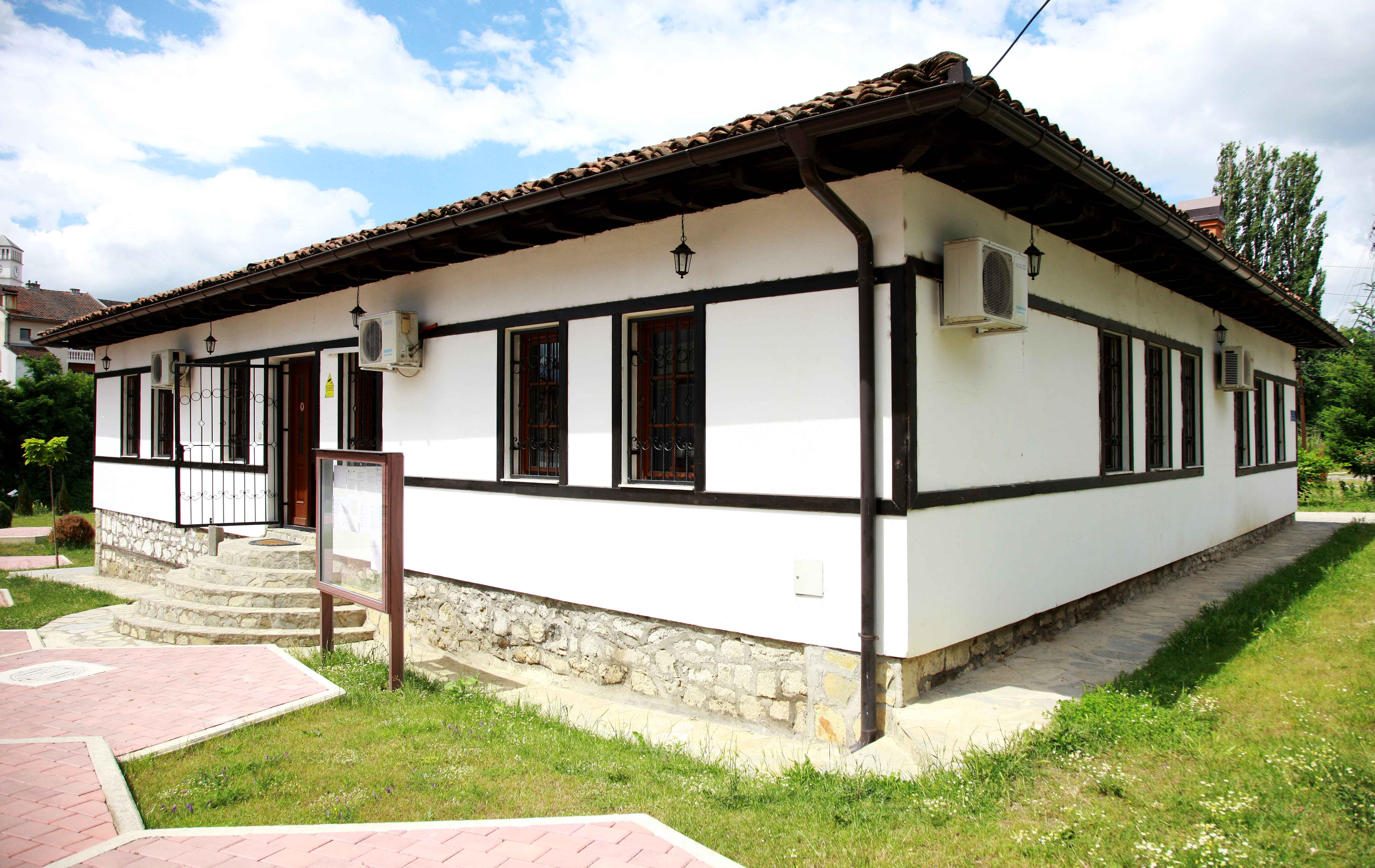
Building of the first Albanian school in Gjakova

A particular role in enriching the educational tradition in the region of Gjakova and beyond was the opening of religious schools, initially schools, later the madrasas.

The city has become an important university town. Today in the municipality of Gjakova, there is also a large number of primary and secondary schools, in the public sector, as well as in the private sector. The education system in Gjakova is organised through numerous schools and includes dedicated physical education classes. Since 2004, notable developments have taken place, particularly with the growth of private institutions. This expansion is most evident at the preschool level, but private schools have also increased in primary and secondary education.

The University of Gjakova Fehmi Agani, is one of the newest public universities in Kosovo. The university began operating on 1 October 2013. In 2014, the Gjakova Summer School for Entrepreneurship were opened in the city.

== Culture ==
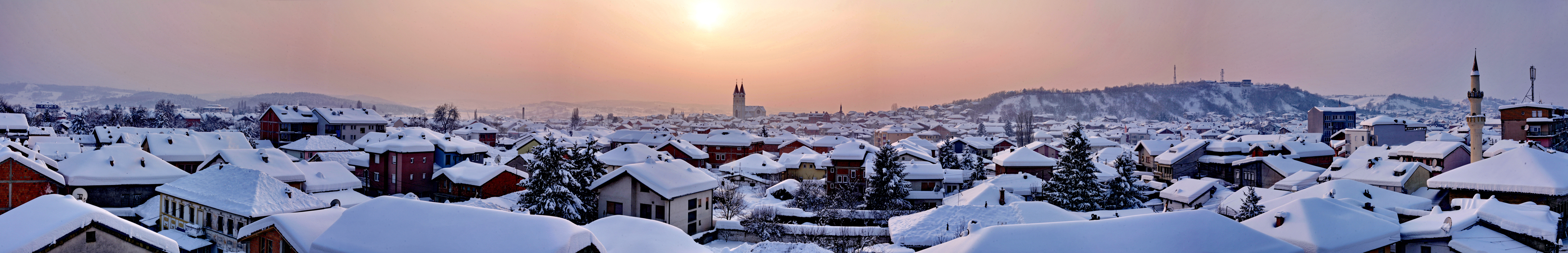
Panoramic view of Gjakova in winter

Historical monuments in Gjakova are divided into three main categories based on their cultural, religious and social context. The core part of the city was created between the Krena River to the east and Cabrati hill to the west. Around the cornerstone of the town, the Old Bazaar—the centre of trade and craftsmanship—was created. By 1900, the bazaar housed around 1000 enterprises. Numerous bridges were built to enable the journey of trade caravans across the neighbouring rivers. With the fast development of trade in the city, several inns were built to host the many visitors. Because of its ancient origins and fast economic development, Gjakova has become of great historical importance.

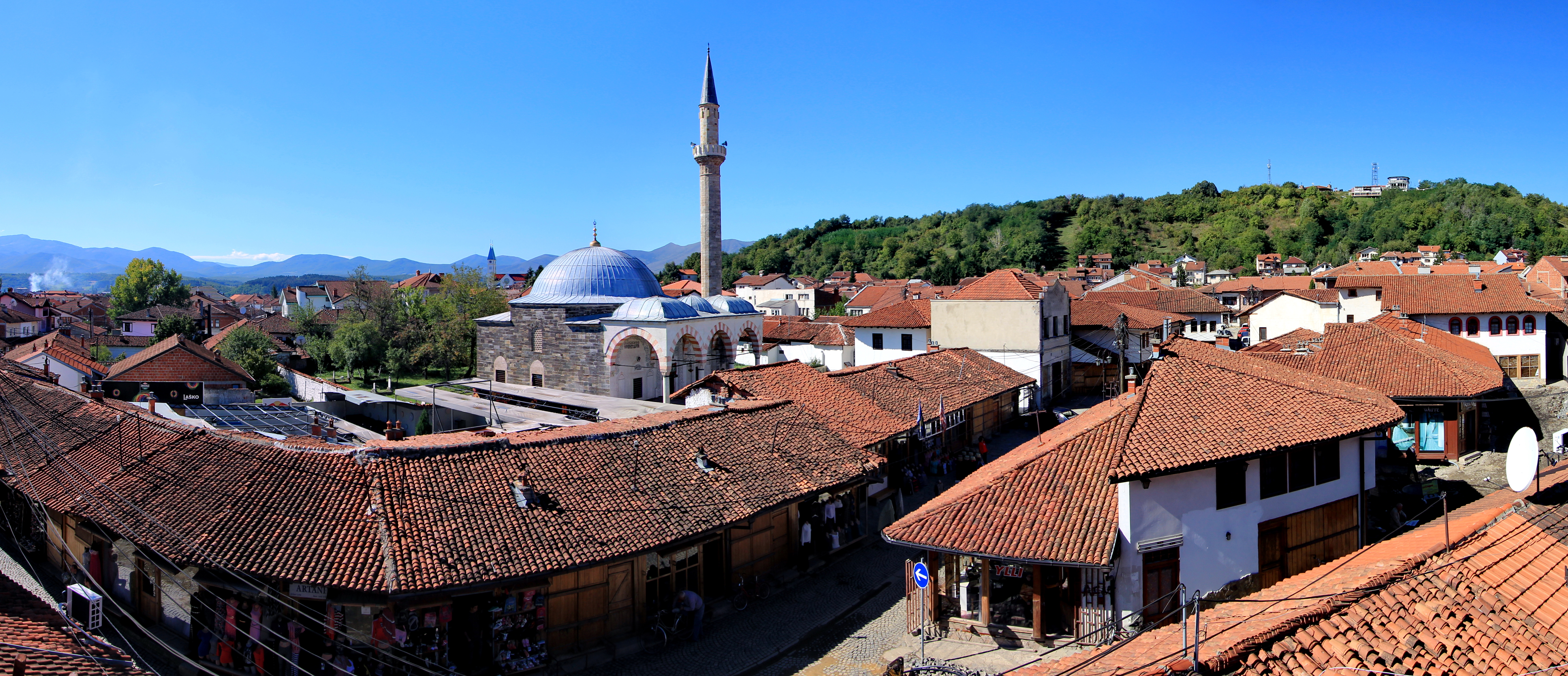
Panoramic view of the Old Bazaar and the Hadum Mosque

The Old or Grand Bazaar (Çarshia e Madhe) in Gjakova is the oldest bazaar in Kosovo, and it served as an Ottoman trading centre and heart of the city economy. It suffered damage during the Kosovo War but has since been renovated. The Hadum Mosque, built in the 16th century, lies by the bazaar, and includes a highly decorated graveyard, where the city notables were buried. Within the mosque complex were the hamam which was destroyed in 2008, the "Old library" from 1671, damaged in the Kosovo War, and also a meytepi from 1777. The Bazaar is linked to the city centre, just five minutes away via the Islam-Beg Bridge. The bazaar covers an area of about 35,000 m^{2} (380,000 sq ft) and the length of its main road is 1 km, with about 500 shops situated along it. It is, however, still home to an active mosque, several türbes, and a clocktower.

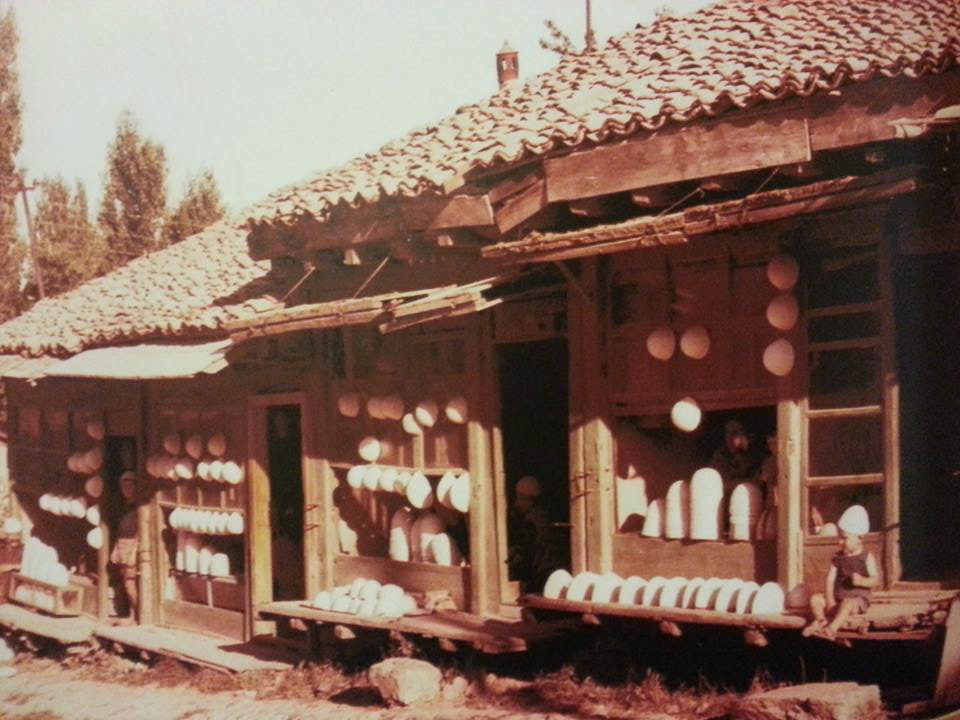
Albanian plis shop in the Old Bazaar in Gjakova (1936)

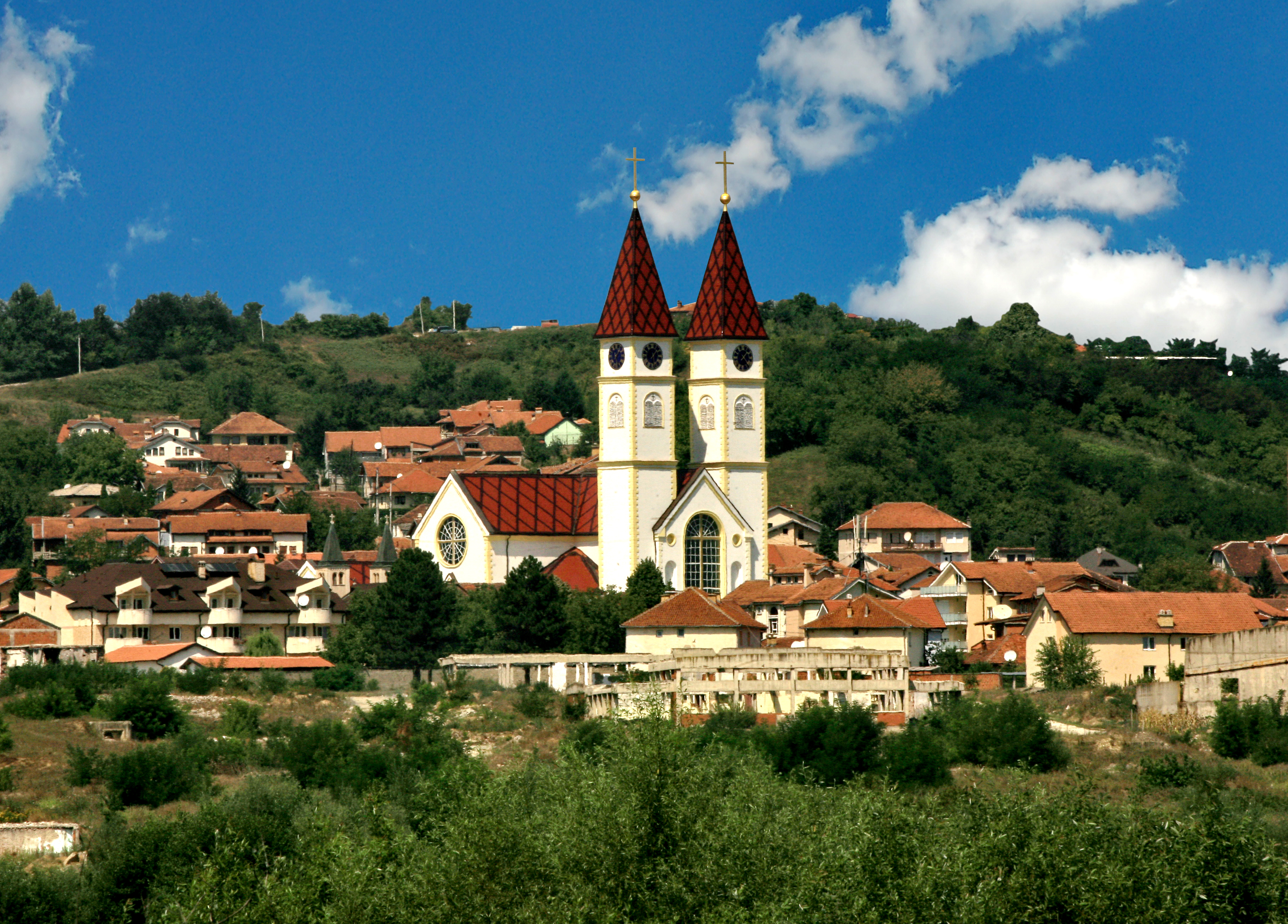
View of the Saint Paul and Saint Peter Church

The Hadum Mosque, located in the Old Bazaar, built in 1594 by Ottoman architect Mimar Sinan and financed by Hadum Aga. The mosque has played a significant role in the urban character of the city from the 17th to 20th centuries. Its construction was followed by the appearance of the craftsmanship around it, which increased the importance of the city. The mosque holds historical value and is viewed of as a sacred monument. The great Tekke ("Teqja e Madhe"), built by the end of the 16th century by Shejh Suleyman Axhiza Baba, a Sufi mystic from Shkodra. It belongs to the Saadi order of Sufism. The complex includes turbe (small mausoleums), samahanes (ritual prayer-halls), houses and fountains. It is characterised with detailed sacral architecture, with wood-carved elements.

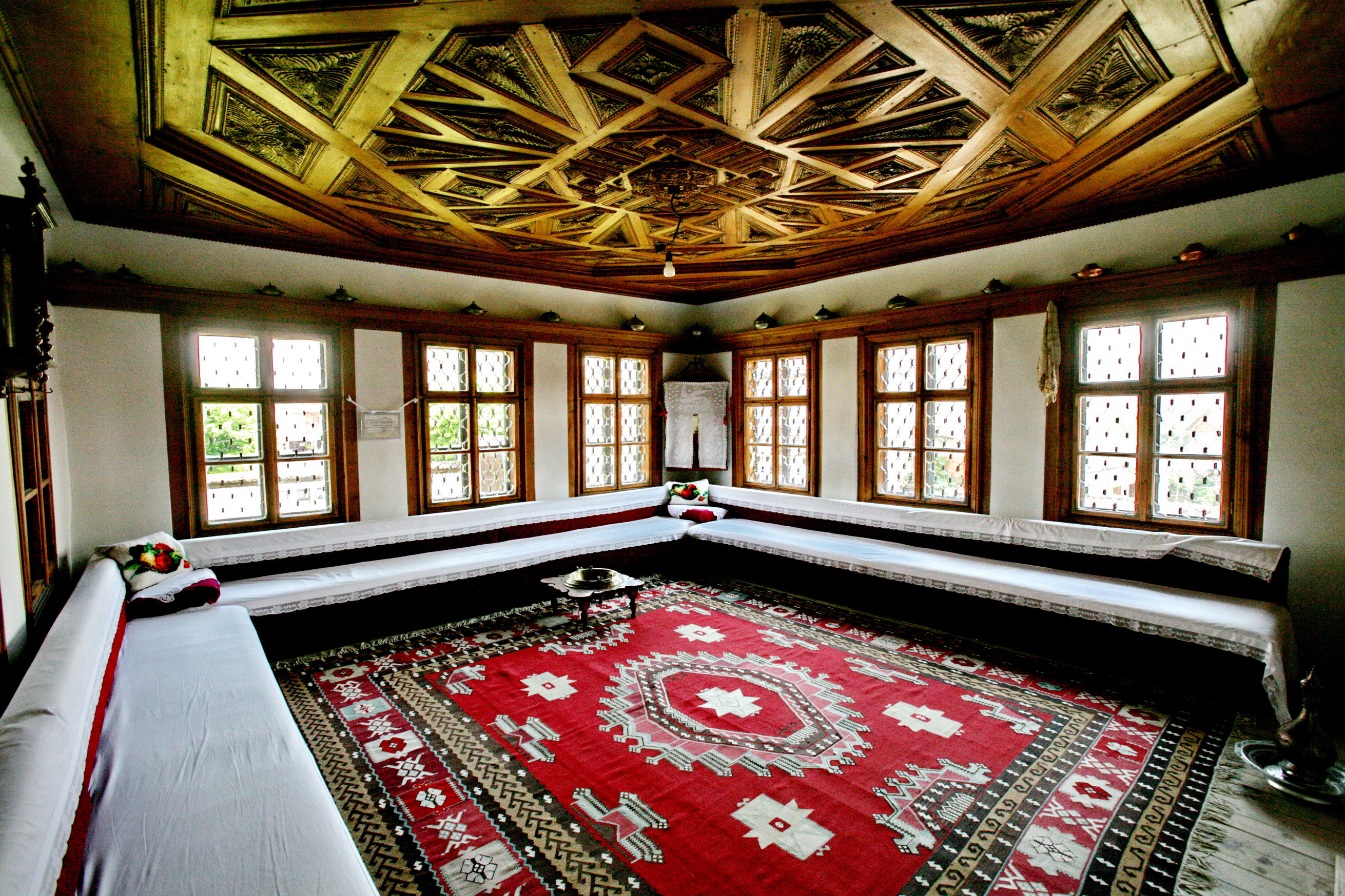
The Ethnographic Museum of Gjakova was built in 1830. It has been under legal protection since 1955.

Gjakova is also characterised with two main Catholic Churches, which are part of the cultural heritage. The Saint Paul and Saint Peter Church (Albanian: Kisha e Shën Palit dhe Shën Pjetrit) is one of the tallest monuments in Gjakova, which can be seen from different points of the city. The arrival of the Albanian Catholics form Malesia resulted in rejuvenation of Saint Peter's Church in Gjakova in 1703, while in 1851 Gjakova's parish is rejuvenated. In 1999, after the War it was totally destroyed. In the same site the new cathedral has been built.

The Saint Ndou Church, was once called also the church of Padre Mila, who had built it in 1882, but it was later destroyed. In 1931, Padre Lorenc Mazrreku built in the same place the church that exists today, which was renovated few times, adding to it the guestrooms, offices and restrooms, but complying with the original architectural concept.

The Clock Tower, built just after the Hadum Mosque at a place known as Field of the Clock, characterises the rapid economic development of Gjakova at that time. It was destroyed during the Balkan Wars, while the belfry was removed and transported to Montenegro. With sides 4.10m long and a height of about 30 metres, a new clock tower was built later near the foundations of the previous one. Constructed mainly of stone with the wooden observation area and the roof covered in lead, the clock tower is unique of its kind.

=== Festivals ===
Although limited in number, events and festivals in Gjakova are highly regarded. The historic city—particularly its Old Town—serves as a vibrant hub for outdoor and indoor festivals, cultural gatherings, and street parades. Many of these events are seasonal and occur only once, while others have been organised annually for years by various cultural associations. They attract strong interest from both locals and visitors. Organisation varies, with some events hosted by the municipality and others by private companies.

=== Sports ===
Apart from being a culture and educative centre of the Kosovo, Gjakova is also known as a sport centre. The best example of this is the fact of having 38 clubs, which compete in all leagues over Kosovo. Gjakova's most successful team is KF Vëllaznimi which has won nine titles of Kosovar Superliga and four Kosovo Cups. "Shani Nushi" is the city's sports hall, which has a capacity of 3,500 seats, while the Gjakova City Stadium has a capacity of 6000 seats.

== Transport ==
There are lots of infrastructure facilities of railways and platforms which currently are out of function. Pristina International Airport is some 70 kilometres east of Gjakova. It is the only port of entry for air travellers to Kosovo. In northern of the city, there is the Gjakova Airport situated.

== International relations ==
Gjakova is twinned with: (Note: Citations regarding the twin or sister cities of Pristina:)

- Lezhë, Albania
- Sarandë, Albania
- Fort Dodge, United States
- Jamestown, United States
- Lodève, France

== Notable people ==
- List of people from Gjakova

== Sources ==
- Clark, Howard (2000). Civil Resistance in Kosovo. Pluto Press. ISBN 0745315690.
