= White Drin Waterfall =

White Drin Waterfall Ujëvara e Drinit të Bardhë
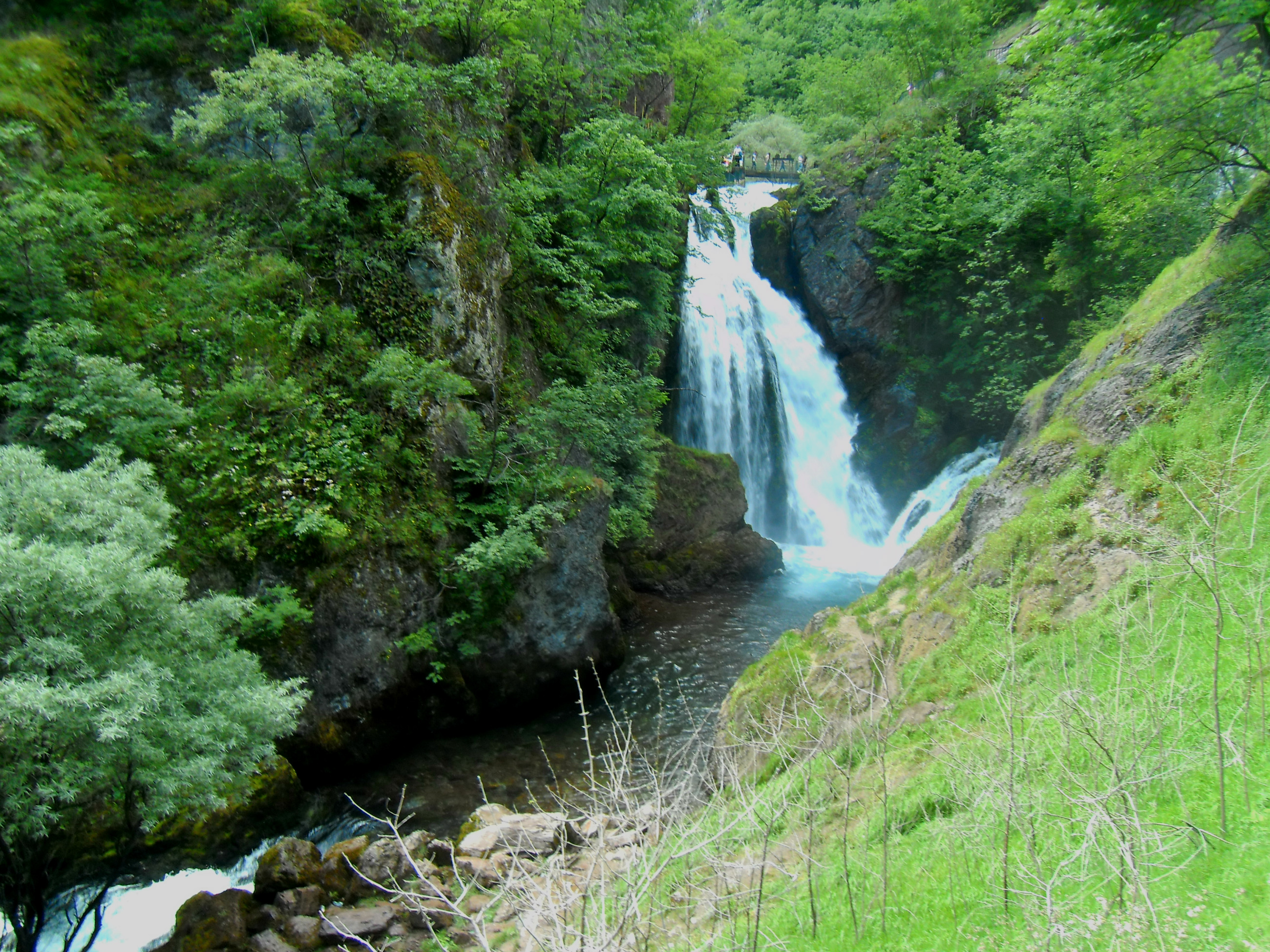
- Waterfall at the mouth of the White Drin river
- Interactive map of White Drin Waterfall; Ujëvara e Drinit të Bardhë
- Location: Radaca, Peja, Kosovo
- Coordinates: 42°44′17″N 20°18′21″E
- Elevation: 560 m (1,840 ft)
- Total height: 25 m (82 ft)
- Watercourse: White Drin

The White Drin Waterfall (Albanian: Ujëvara e Drinit të Bardhë) is a waterfall in the western part of Kosovo. It is located in the Zhleb Mountain within the Accursed Mountains and is situated near the village of Radac, which is 11 km away from the town of Peja. The waterfall is located at the mouth of the White Drin river and is 25 m (82 ft) high. The mountainous scenery surrounds the waterfall, and makes it a popular tourist attraction throughout Kosovo. Other smaller waterfalls are near the area.

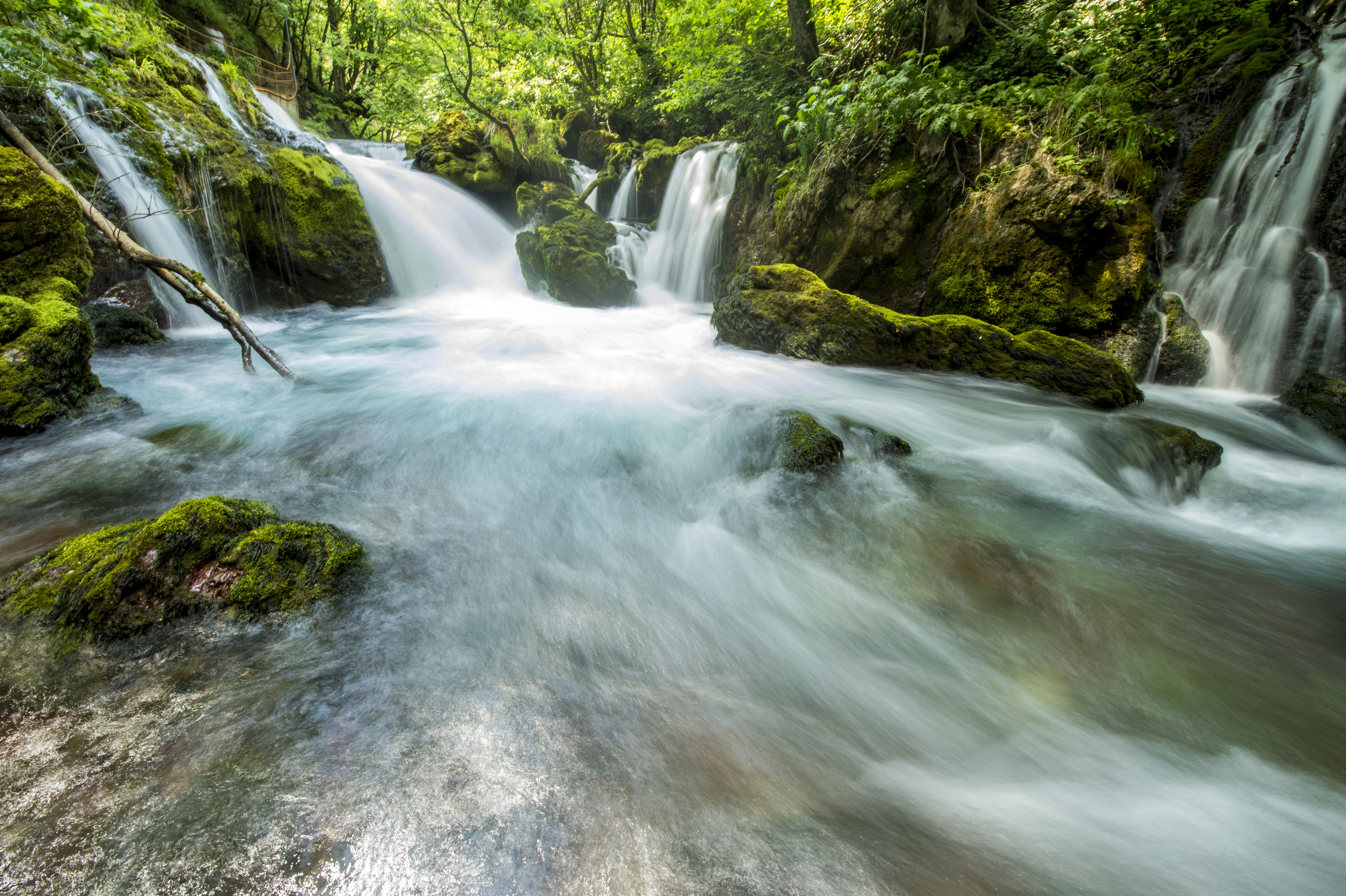
The flow of White Drin further downstream

The waterfall, together with the cave and the spring of White Drin River is taken under legal protection in 1983, as nature monument due to its geomorphological, hydrological and touristic values with a surface of 89.94 ha (1 km^{2}).

== See also ==
- List of waterfalls
