= Church of St. Paul and St. Peter, Gjakova =

Catholic church in Gjakova, Kosovo

Coordinates: 42°22′25″N 20°25′26″E

Church of St. Paul and St. Peter
- Kisha e Shën Palit dhe Shën Pjetrit
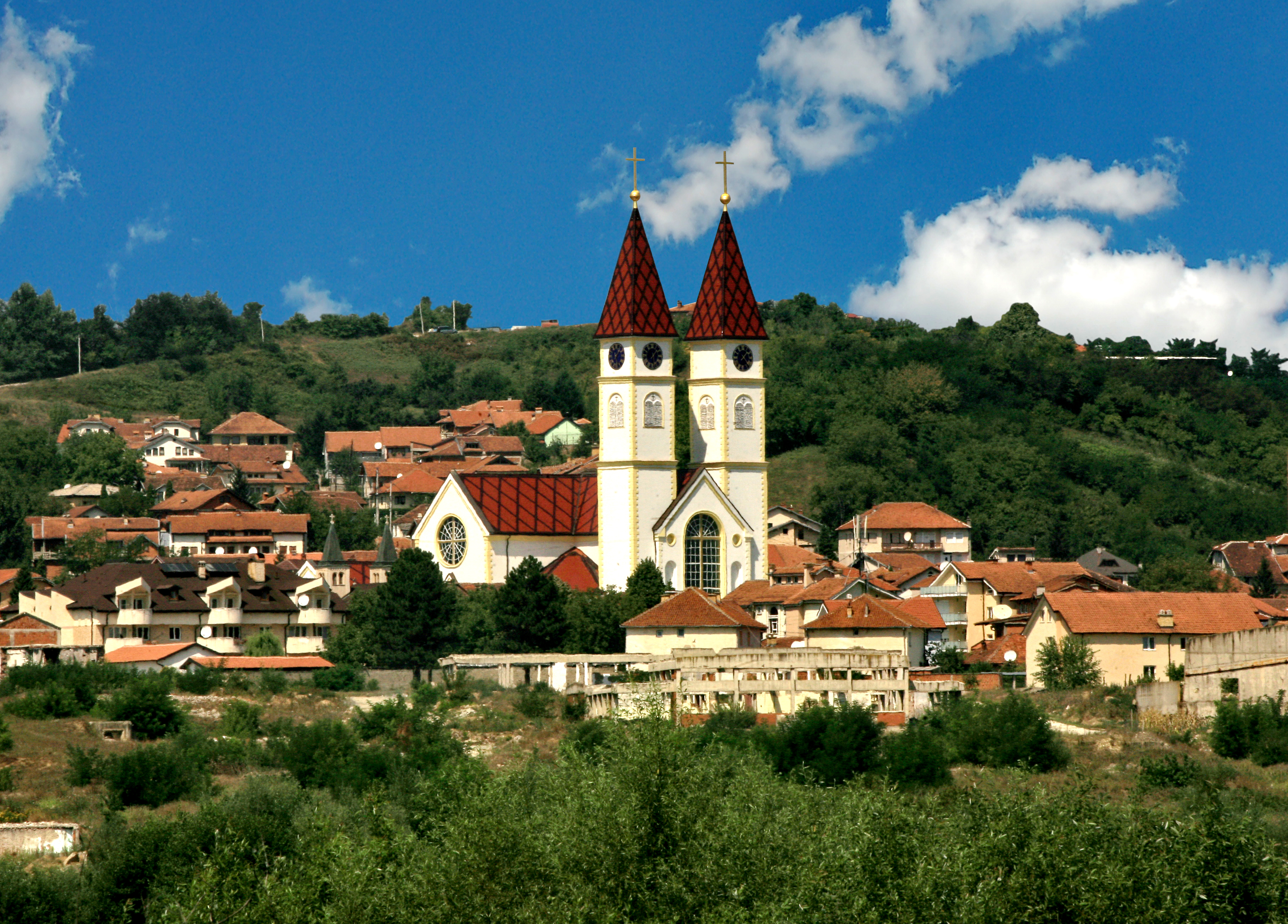
- Church of St. Paul and St. Peter
- Location: Gjakova, Kosovo
- Denomination: Catholic

The Church of St. Paul and St. Peter is a Catholic church and cultural heritage monument in Gjakova, Kosovo.

== History ==
Catholicism in the region dates back to the middle ages, but during different periods of Ottoman rule the number of Catholics decreased and, as a result, the church's parish often ceased to function. The arrival of Albanian Catholics from Malësia resulted in the renovation of the old church of St. Peter in Gjakova in 1703, while in 1851 the parish of Gjakova was renovated. It was then dedicated to St. Paul and St. Peter. In the Kosovo War it was completely destroyed. After it was destroyed, a new cathedral was built on the same site.
