= Lluka e Epërme Kuttab =

Cultural heritage monument of Kosovo

- Mejtepi në fshatin Lluka e Epërme (Albanian)
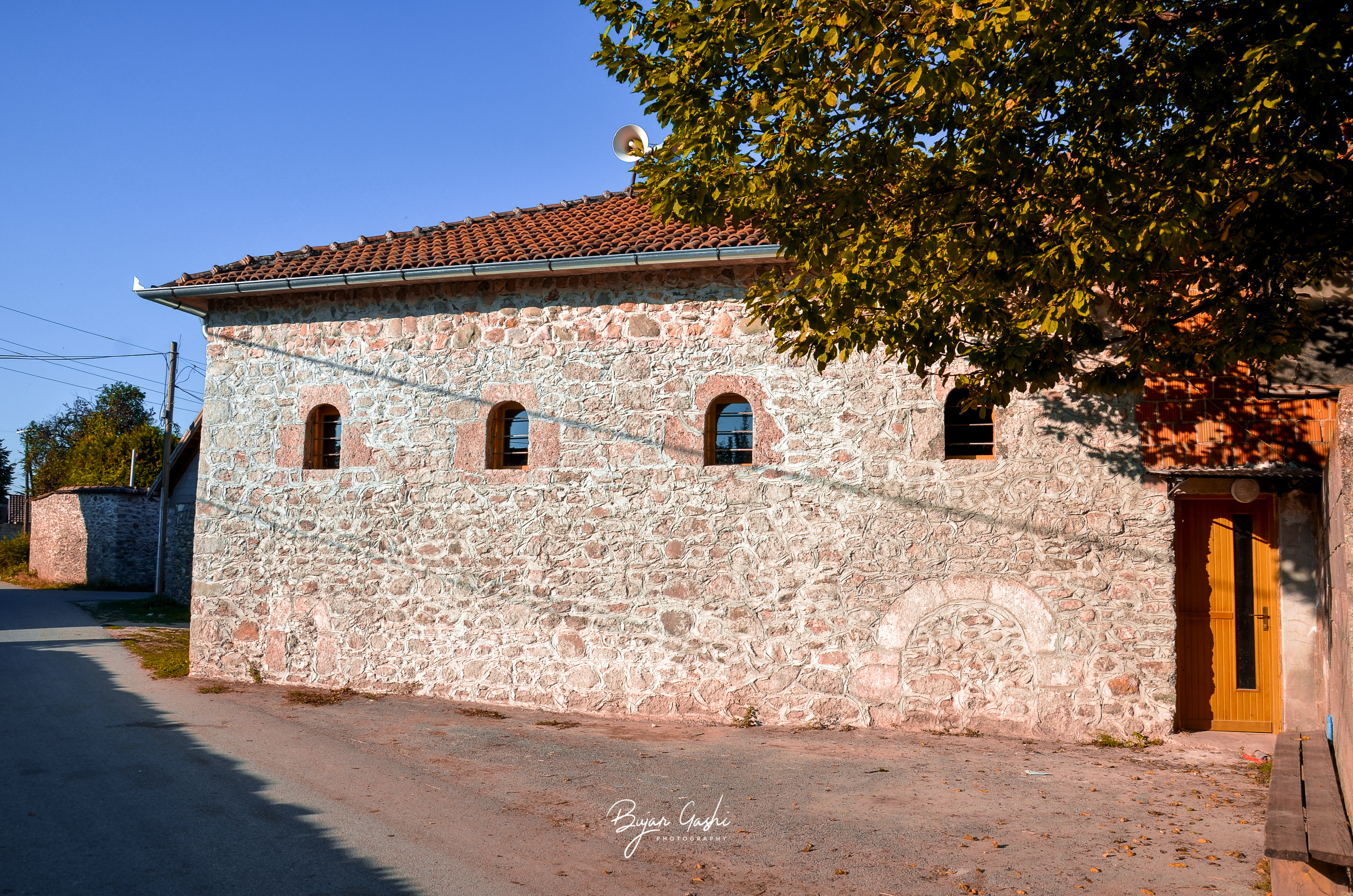
- Location: Lluka e Epërme, Deçan, Kosovo

History
- Built: 19th century

The Lluka e Epërme Kuttab is a cultural heritage monument built in 1826 in Lluka e Epërme, Deçan, Kosovo.

== History ==
The kuttab or madrasa, known by the local term as the Tahir Efendi Jakova Mejtep, lies on a street near the center of the village of Lluka e Epërme. Built by local craftsmen in the 19th century, the kuttab resembles the tower houses of the Metohija Plain in its wood and stone construction. The traditional approached used here employs natural stone masonry for the doorways, windows, and corners, contrasting with the rest. Most of the kuttab is preserved in its original form, save for some later renovations to the masonry and exterior plastering. The earliest Albanian language school in the area, it was inventoried on 27 November 2002, and is located in cadastral zone 61800, lot 157.
