= Old Bazaar, Gjakova =

Gjakova - Çarshia e Vjetër 2018

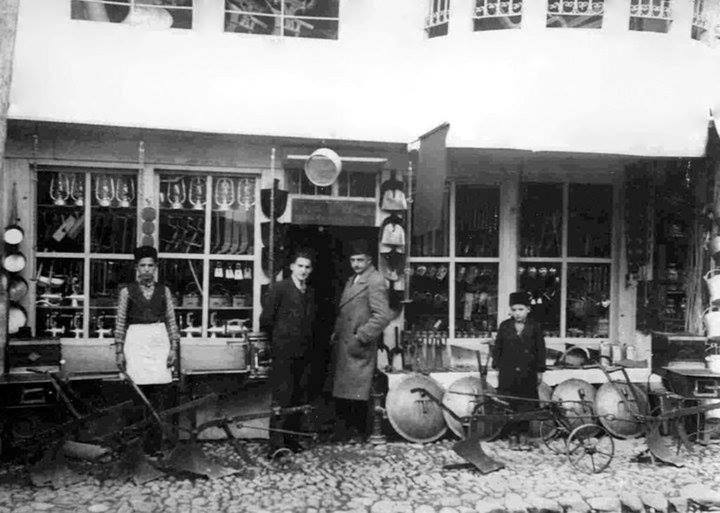
A shop in the Old Bazaar, Gjakova 1957

The Old Bazaar (Albanian: Pazari i vjetër; Serbian: Стари базар / Stari bazar) in Gjakova is the oldest bazaar in Kosovo (also known as Çarshia e Madhe (Grand Bazaar) or Dakovica. Mëhalla e Hadumit, the historical neighborhood where it is located also houses the city's oldest mosque, the Hadum Mosque (Xhamia e Hadumit), which dates from the 15th century.

The Grand Bazaar (from the Turkish: Çarşı meaning marketplace Albanian: Çarshia e Vjetër) was the heart of the economy in Gjakova, a city of trade and merchandise which served the villages around the municipality of Gjakova, the Junik zone and Gjakova’s highlands (Malësia e Gjakovës) on the border between Kosovo and Albania. The Old Bazaar was burnt and destroyed and then it was reconstructed after suffering damage during the 1999 war (the last war in Kosovo).

Around the mosque lie the graves with sculpted decorations, with inscriptions engraved in the old Ottoman language. In the past, it was used to bury members of the popular families in Gjakova. Within the mosque’s complex were the hamam (Turkish bathhouse) which was destroyed in 2008, the building of the old library, from 1671 (burnt by Serbian forces during the war of 1999 and totally ruined in 2000) and also meytepi from 1777.

The bazaar is linked to the city centre, just five minutes away via the IslamBegu Bridge. The bazaar covers an area of about 35,000 m^{2} (380,000 sq ft) and the length of its main road is 1 km, with about 500 shops situated along it. It is, however, still home to an active mosque, several türbes, and a clock tower, which was destroyed during the First Balkan War and was recently rebuilt.

== History ==
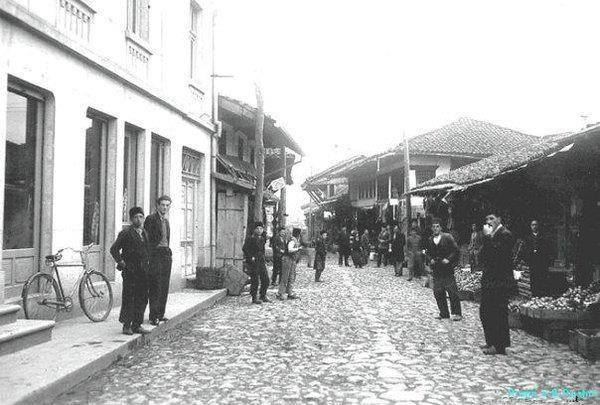
The Old Bazaar

Grand Bazaar of Gjakova arose with the appearance of the first craftsmen and the artisan processing produce; it arose then when Gjakova obtained the kasaba (small town) status, when in 1003 H (1594/95), Selman Hadim Aga donated some public facilities, which he had built himself to religious institutions the Hadum Mosque, a meytep (elementary religious school), a library, a muvakit-hane, “a building for measuring the time and determining the calendar by means of astrolabic quadrates", a public bath (hamam), an inn and some shops. For the maintenance of these facilities he asked from sultan to attach to his “vakif” some lands of sultan properties (hases), whose income should be used for the maintenance of the mentioned buildings and for the payment of the staff that would work there.

However, the first direct facts about the Grand Bazaar were provided by the Turk traveloguer Evlia Çelebi, who visited Gjakova in 1662 and, it seems, was amazed by the beauty and treasure of the city and of Gjakovar citizens. Among other things, he wrote: “Jakova has two thousand decorated houses located in a vast field. It has two beautiful mosques, mosques without a minaret (“mesjide”), inns covered in lead. It has a beautiful public bath (hamam) that pleases your heart and about three hundred shops with one thousand kinds of crafts. Referring to the impressions the Gjakovars left on him, he continues "Since it has a lovely climate, the inhabitants are good looking and kind".

As it can be seen from the beginnings, there was a great number of shops in the Grand Bazaar, in which almost all kinds of trades were developed aiming at fulfilling all the needs of the population of the region of Gjakova and of export such as those of metal processors, leather processors, textile processors, tinsmiths, saddlers, (shag-makers) white woolen cap-makers, rug-makers etc. The metal processing included some very important trades for that time, such as gunsmiths, silversmith, copper dishes productions, tinsmith etc. In the 18th century the famous gun master Tush the gunsmith was mentioned in Gjakova, who dealt not only with their producing, but also with their decoration. As a master of luxurious guns producing, which at that time were requested without any distinction by all the social classes, he managed to create, in this century, “the people's school" of this trade, known until today by his name.

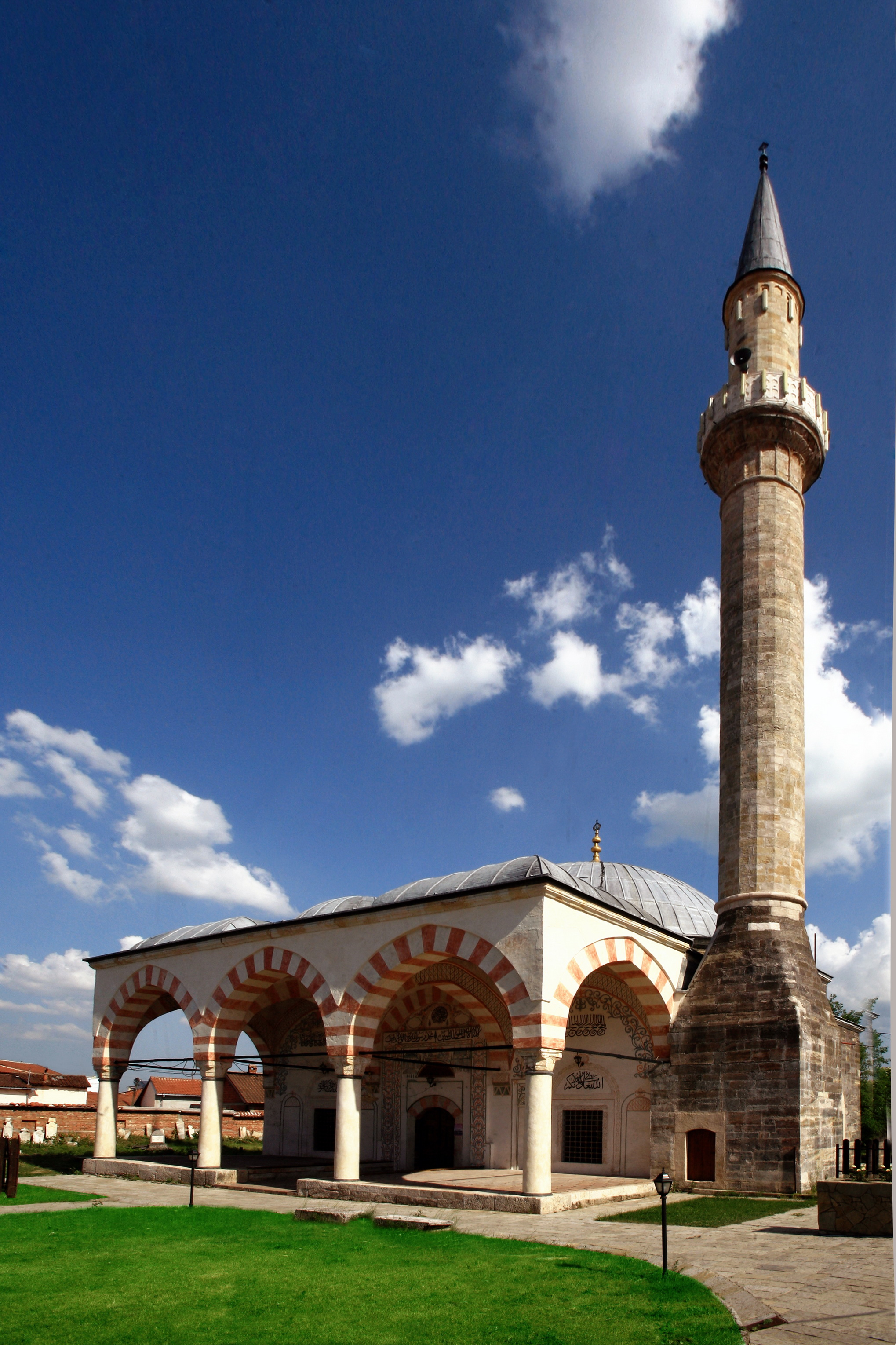
Hadum Mosque

== Crafts ==
The craft of cutlers, that used to be practised also in Gjakova, was older than the one of gunsmiths. The craftsmen dealing with this craft used to produce different knives, such as "dimi", daggers, yatagans, etc., whose handles they decorated with beautiful ornaments.

According to the English author Night, Gjakova was one of the most interesting towns with quite craftily inhabitants in metal processing. He would express himself that “the most beautiful saddles, filigree products, the golden sword handles making and the decorations of yatagans and pistols were produced here from hard-working people. He would, further continue: “Albanians of Shkodra, Gjakova and Prizren are well-known masters in the production of guns and other items of metal. J. Mueller claimed in 1838, about Gjakova, that the guns of this town especially the pistols enjoy a special respect also in Sarajevo.

Luxury personal objects and other artistic items, worked in gold, silver and pearls were constructed here. The silversmiths' works matched not only the taste and requirements of the local population, but also those of foreign countries. Therefore, the silversmiths became well-known with their artistic products everywhere. Th. Ippen wrote that the silver products of Gjakova were traded everywhere and “are famous all over Albania”. The English journalist Mehew wrote, among other things: “Albanians are not only hardworking and capable of different handwork, but the country has some rare products, which do not remain behind some artistic products of our western capitals at all. Can this be said for Montenegrins, Bosnians or Serbs? In the towns of Peja and Gjakova filigree works in gold and silver are made, which are much better than those of Malta, both from the artistic sense expressed in their motives and in the weaving and wonderful finesse of these items. These excellent works of Gjakova, similar to laces, are demanded in every market, as well as very precious “golden cups made in filigree, made to protect the hand from burning”- as Lord Byron mentioned them in his work Don Juan, which usually are put under the little coffee cups, are always of Albanian production. Among Gjakovar silversmiths' products for personal decoration were the rings, earrings, wrist rings, “feses”, etc. that were used in local rich families and were exported to Istanbul. Also, the silversmiths used to decorate the pipes, mirror frames, etc.

=== Guns ===
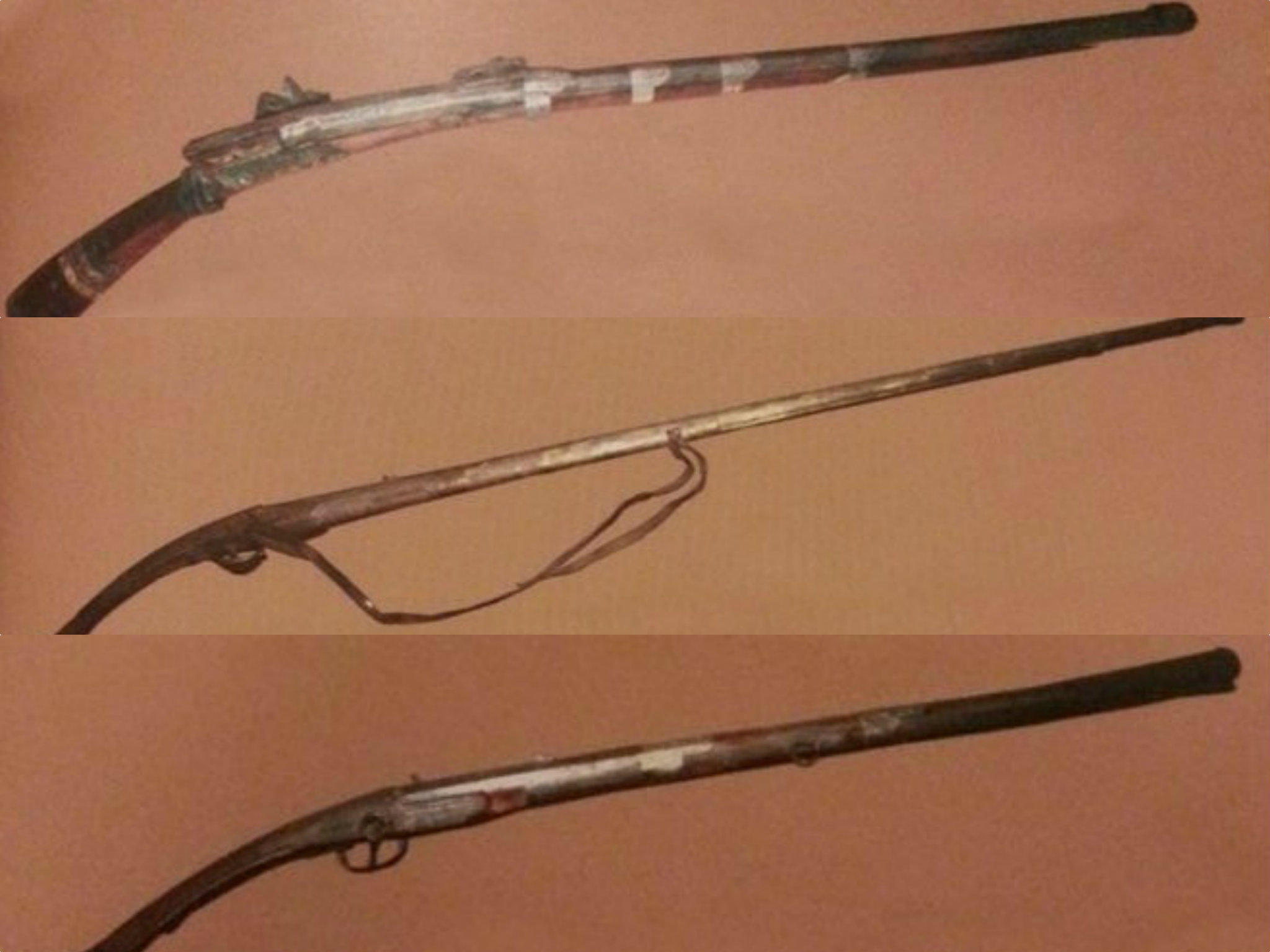
Gjakova guns "Huta" decorated in savat technique - long and short karajfile from the 17th to 19th centuries

According to the 19th-century Bulgarian scholar, Ivan Mihov, Gjakova was also among most important centers of luxurious guns production. The Shkodra French consul, Hecardy, would write that “same as all the other Albanians, also the highlanders like luxurious guns", which were decorated with a lot of art (passion), with carving, with mother-of pearls (“sedef”) and pearls, which were produced in Prizren, Gjakova and in Tetova. Gunsmiths of Gjakova, had become well known for the production of "Gjakova pistols”, “whose value consisted especially in the beauty of the round but pommel or rosary".

As better known Gjakovar gunsmiths are mentioned Tusha from the 18th century, whose name is related to the development of gunsmithery and silversmithery in this town, whereas in the 19th century Emin Kazari, Murat Nuka, Ramadan Nuka, Çaush Basha, Beqir Pula, etc. are mentioned. Referring to the gunsmithery tradition, Theodor Ippen, among other things, wrote, “…Earlier, in Shkodra, Prizren, and in Gjakova, there were large gunsmith, long rifle, and side-handgun and yataghan workshops. These old guns were then in wide use. There are facts, according to which Gjakovar gunsmiths set up workshops also outside their place, competing successfully the products of those places where they established their shops. Thus they caused the discontent of the local gunsmiths. In a letter sent to prince Milos, on 6 October 1837, it is said that in Gurgusovac there is a gunsmith from Gjakova, Bajram Mustafa with his two sons-apprentices, against whom the local craftsmen were complaining.

Tushe was considered as the most talented master for producing and decoration of celinas. The long rifles and those of waist of Gjakova, produced "in the Albanian fashion", decorated with gold and silver had become well-known all over Europe since the 18th century. However, according to Franz Noptsche, Gjakova became well-known later also for the producing of "martin" type guns and was a strong competitor in selling this product in the home market. But this gun model as well as other guns of Albanian fashion were sold also abroad in most distant markets. Gjakovar gunsmiths used to produce also other necessary equipment for the use of guns, such as circles, which were in use until the 1860s and 1870s, until the beginning of use of fire guns with “viaskas”. Although initially the Gjakovar gunsmiths produced rifles, later they shifted exclusively to bullet producing. Among other things, they would go to cattle fairs in Ivanjica, where they would successfully sell their products. The Gjakova craftsmen used to produce cartridges for the rebels of Karageorge. According to Sami Frashëri in Gjakova guns, silver, Albanian national costumes and some kinds of silk fabrics were produced. The trade was very much developed there. Often Albanian guns were called (labelled) by the names of places of production. Thus, among other things, the Gjakovars (the hunt guns) were well known, guns that were decorated according to the “people’s school” style of the 18th century of the famous gunsmith and silversmith Tusha.

=== Clothing ===
The working of national costumes, which were decorated with autochthonous ornaments, had the priority for both women and men. It is known that the Albanian national costumes were distinguished for their beauty and for the fine taste of Albanian tailors. Therefore, it is no wonder why Byron had bought Albanian costumes, in which he was painted in front of European artists. The Russian academic Alexander Hilferding, who visited Gjakova in 1857, wrote among other things: "The mydyrr of Gjakova, an Albanian of extraordinary beauty, dressed in a wide faultless white kilt and with a short red jacket stitched (embroidered) in gold, sent me to the clergyman's house.... The tailors of Gjakova worked costumes according to the taste and requests of different social categories and according to the needs of different countries, where they sold their products. They embroidered with modest equipment with gold or silver fibers and, from time to time, in lace (galloons) gowns, waistcoats, tight woolen trousers, sleeveless dresses (fermens), vests (doublets-for women), dolmans, shirts (mintans), etc.

=== Weavers ===
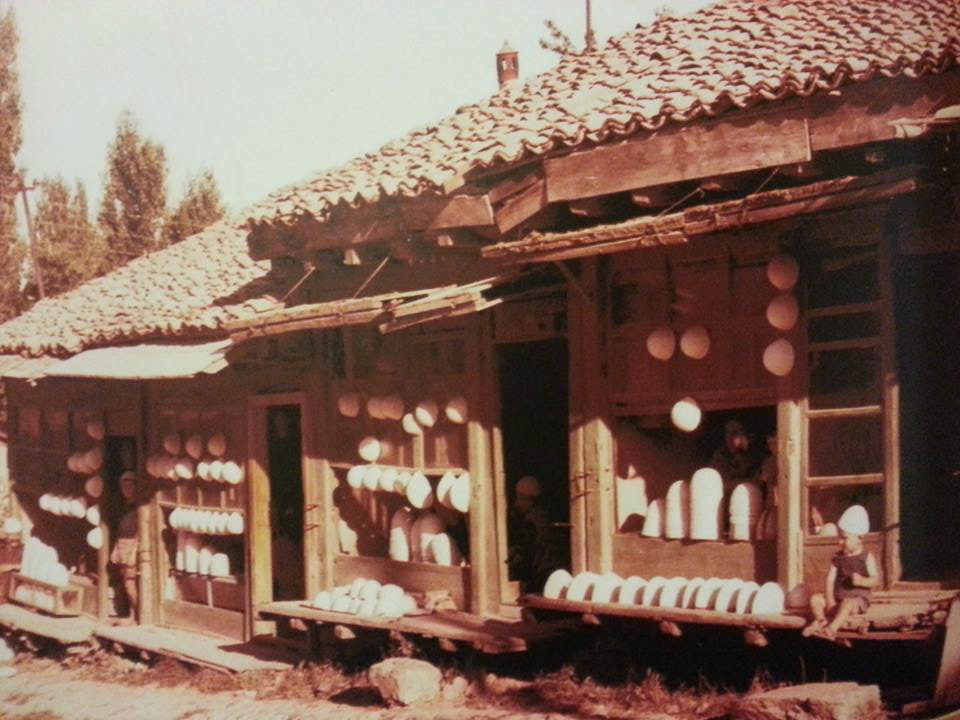
Albanian plis shop in the Old Bazaar - Gjakova, 1936

The weavers of Gjakova produced out of silk and wool fibers of all kinds for the decoration of different parts of national wear galloons, strips, buttons, silk thread (ibrisimi) etc. for the town and their weavers. They would sell these products successfully also in other towns. According to original (local) legends, in 1864, they sent to the international fair of Prilep, 20 bales (bundles) with items of an amount of 120 thousand groshes.

Gjakova was well known for its talented white woollen cap producers, since the establishment of the Grand Bazaar, because the white cap was part of Albanian national costume. It is known that the type of the white round cap (kësulë) similar to present day cap (plis) represents a part of Illyrian wear. The Albanians who took part in the battle of Kosovo, in 1389, according to the legend, came with white woollen caps, as the present day ones. In addition to this, the type of white woollen cap called the Scanderbeg grave speaks of the antiquity of the Albanian woollen white cap.

Thanks to ethnic structure of the population of Gjakova, which the Russian academic Hilferding, called, in 1857, the Albanian city Gjakova was from the beginning the only town of this craft, whereof it spread also into other regions of Kosovo, Northern Albania, Western Macedonia, Sanjak of Jeni Pazar, etc., whilst another town for the South and Middle Albania was Tirana. The mentioned places were supplied in the 18th and 19th centuries with white woollen caps from Gjakova. White woollen cap makers from Gjakova set up their workshops also in Shkup, in Tetova, in Pazar i Ri, in Sjenica and in Sarajevo.

The oldest way of making the white woollen caps with a log (block) (taslak), that was used until the end of the 19th century, was called the "Gjakovar” way (fashion), which differed way from the most perfect way of "Tirana" with two logs (blocks) (taslaks), which started being practised also in Gjakova around the end of 19th century and beginning of the century. The foreman of white woolen cap makers’ guild in Gjakova, which was not as strong as the others in the time of Turkey, was mentioned to have been Jup Bakalli. The Craftsmen Chamber of Gjakova had registered 16 white woollen cap shops before the World War II.

=== Tailors ===
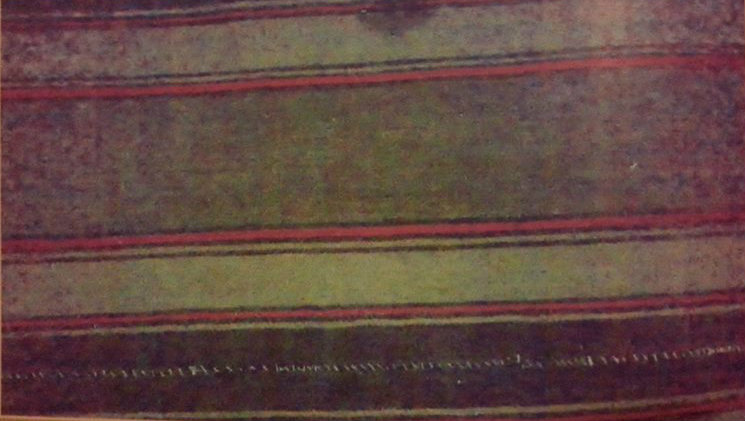
Woolen rug made in Gjakova

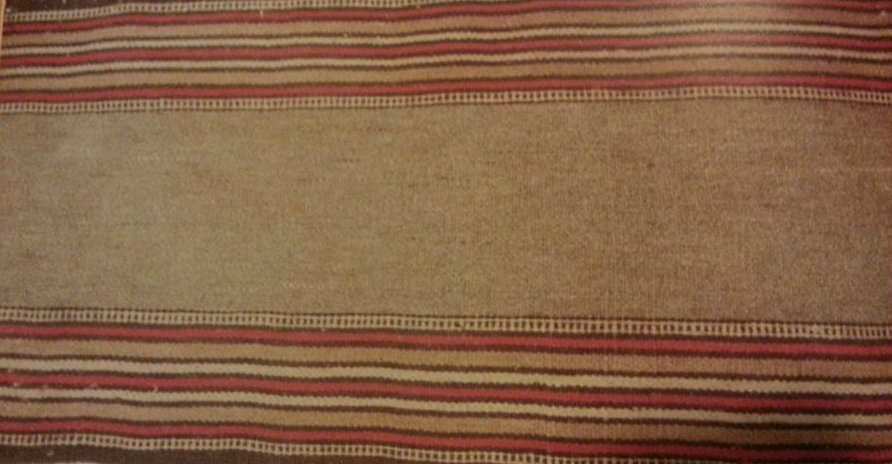
Part of goat-wool rug, made in Gjakova

Since the 18th century, especially in the 20th century, along with the metal processing, the processing of wool and silk, etc., went also on. In the Grand Bazaar of Gjakova felt cloth, woollen and silk fabrics (cloths), woollen and silk pipings (galloons) etc. used to be produced and sold in great amounts and were exported in even greater amounts in the markets and fairs of the neighboring provinces of Balkan countries, in Medieval countries and in Central European countries, too. Beautiful and high quality carpets and rugs were produced and sold there. The year book ("Salname") of Prizren Vilayet of 1874 used to mention the great number of tailors (“terzis”), tanners (“tabaks”) and embroiderers. The tailors used to work, according to it, first class cord dolmans and waistcoats for women and men, but these products used to meet only the country's needs. But for their own needs, the inhabitants of kasaba (the town) used to produce a kind of rough woollen cloth-worsted cloth. This shows that the textile artisan production had exceeded the patriarchal borders and had entered widely into the road of production of goods for market.

In Gjakova the tailors were divided into categories according to the town social classes. The first category for example, worked for the rich city classes with selected import cloths which were with high prices. Sami Frasheri claimed that the Gjakova craftsmen “sew nice costumes weave the galloon, produce "sole", shoes and other products”. In Peje and Gjakova, he would continue, “guns, silver dishes, national Albanian costumes and some silk fabrics were produced”. This craft (trade) existed in Gjakova until the 1970s. This craft is nowadays practised only by women “which is a unique and characteristic phenomenon for this craft and typically for Gjakova”. However, until recently it was practised also by men in their houses, like Him Xhama, Reshyt Xharra etc. In fact even today this craft is practiced by Mr. Fehmi Shllaku. The tailors' guild in Gjakova was the most powerful guild.

According to Ivan Stepanovich Jastrebov, the tailors' guild was distinguished for its wealth. It had 200 shops, which were always busy. Let us mention that the Gjakova craftsmen of national costumes for brides and other young women, with luxurious decorations with gold and silver fibers (filaments), practised this craft until recently only in Gjakova, whereof it spread also in other regions of Kosovo, because these wears got again in trend. The waistcoats and shirts (mintans) became an obligatory part of costumes for brides and young women. In the period 1945- 1963 Gjakova had twice more tailors than any other center of Kosova. Pristina had 39 tailor and tailor shops, Mitrovica had 61, Prizren 60, Peja 56, whilst Gjakova 112, of which 69 were registered as old tailors (terzis), whereas 47 as modern tailors.

=== Leather production ===
The leather production gave impetus also to the development of the craft of furrier (leather worker), craft of leather processing. The furriers produced boxes for tobacco and money, saddlebags, cartridge belts, wallets, sashes (leather waistbands), saddles, reins, bridles, belts and other necessary products for the supply of transport and pack animals. Saddles were the most precious articles produced by the furriers. They were decorated with silver, with colorful and metal decorations etc. In Shkodra, in Gjakova, and in Manastir, according to Mueller, saddles were produced, which differed from the others, because their rear and front parts were more lifted. The furriers (leather workers), same as tanners and slipper makers, used to sell their products inland and abroad. But around the end of the 19th century the fall of these crafts started.

The making of moccasins was a craft related to the leather production and spread in the Grand Bazaar since early times. However, the production of shoes influenced in the fall of this production in the 1890s. According to the yearbook (salname) of Kosovo vilayet of 1887 “low-heel shoes and slipper of Gjakova have fallen and they do not have the previous value”.

An old craft practised until recently was the one of fur processing with domestic and wild animal leather, such as those of suckling lambs, of foxes, of beech marten etc. The furs that were produced in Gjakova, which had a good tradition in this production, were also sold in outer market. Mueller wrote “the processing of wild leather into furs and of sheep leather is done in Peja, Gjakova and Dibra. In Gjakova the craft of goat-wool rug makers was developed, which was related to the way of goods transportation on horses, in caravans. The raw material of these craftsmen was the goat wool for producing rags, rugs, sacks, saddle-bags, different bags, breast collars and horse covers, large sacks, different rugs (halis) for bedding etc. In the early 20th century the rug makers of Gjakova processed 2 thousand kg of goat wool.

=== Pipe makers ===
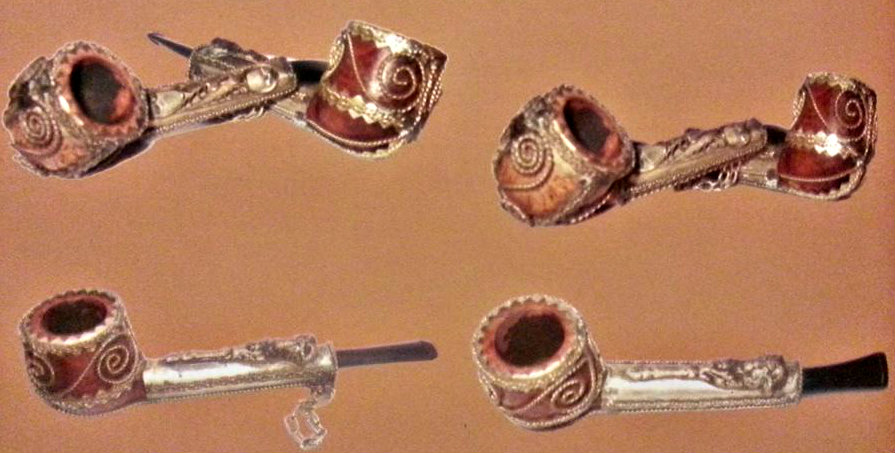
Pipes covered in silver, made in Gjakova

It is worth mentioning that Gjakova was known in the whole region of Dukagjini Plain mostly for the development of pipe-makers craft, whilst the center for Kosovo was Pristina. This craft existed in these two centers until the late 1960s. Other craftsmen like clog (wooden sandal) makers, carpenters, and wood carvers from villages etc. used to deal with production of pipes, long pipes (chibouks, çubuks), and cigarette-boxes. In the past this craft was carried out also by silversmiths, who took care particularly of decoration of long pipes and weavers, who wove with silky galloons parts of the smoking set. The raw material used for the production of chibouks, long pipes, cigarette boxes and pipes was wood and horn, but in the past, ivory and bones were used. The terminology of this craft in Gjakova was in Albanian, whereas in Pristina it was in Turkish language.

The oldest chibouk-makers family was the one of Zejnullah Ramadani, who until around 1958 kept his shop in the Little Bazaar. Until then also the brothers Dan and Shaban Dema and Ahmet Muhaxhiri had their shops in the end of 19th century, due to better profit conditions. Beqir Tirana moved in (settled) in Gjakova, who returned to his hometown in the early 20th century.

=== Carpentry ===
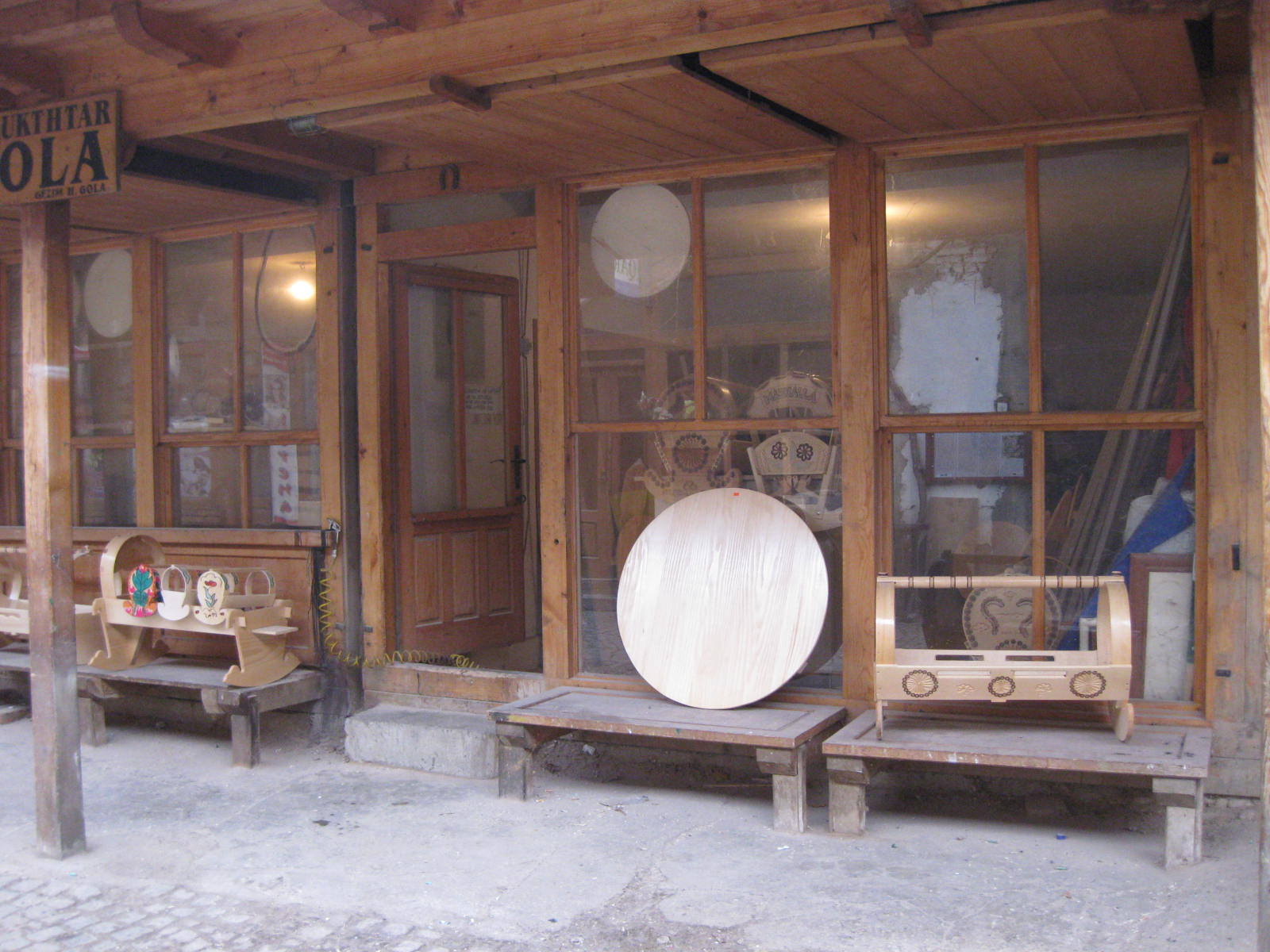
Carpenter's shop in the Old Bazaar - Cradle makers

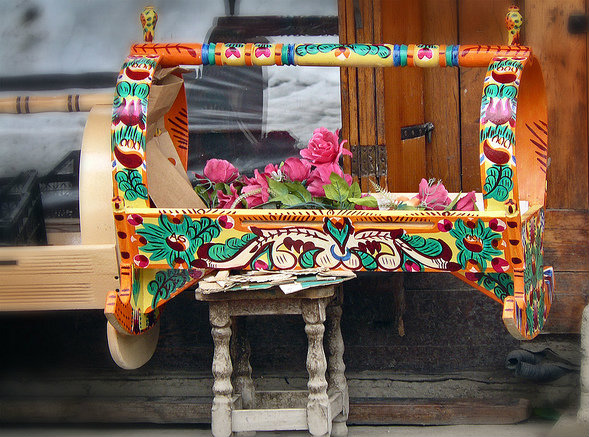
Gjakovar cradle

The carpenters, who had their shops, many in the Box-makers Street, but also in other parts of the Grand Bazaar and other parts of the city, worked and carved with hand tools objects for daily needs in household, in building and in artisan workings, such as boxes and housewife boxes for brides, cradles and hammocks for children, boards for braziers and brassieres; school desks, folding chairs for reading, bookcases, shelves and ceiling decorations, decorations and carvings for rifle butts, coffins and equipment for Muslim and Christian corpses etc. They decorated luxurious products with paints and carving. They learned the painting craft, the combination of eleven paints, from the master Rexhep Shkodra. Inspired from him, they became later themselves authors of different ornaments of floral world with the wood carving that they had inherited from ancient times.

The most famous carpenters were the families of Qarri, Kusari, Canamusa, Alushi and Cana of Dallt, Rasim and Ymer Tullumi, Tafil Morinaa, Ismet Saliuka etc.

=== Bookbinding ===
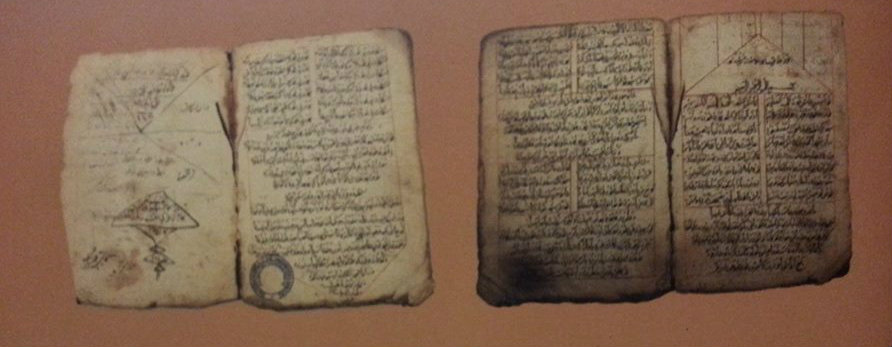
"Vehbija" of Tahir Gjakova - written in Albanian in Ottoman alphabet

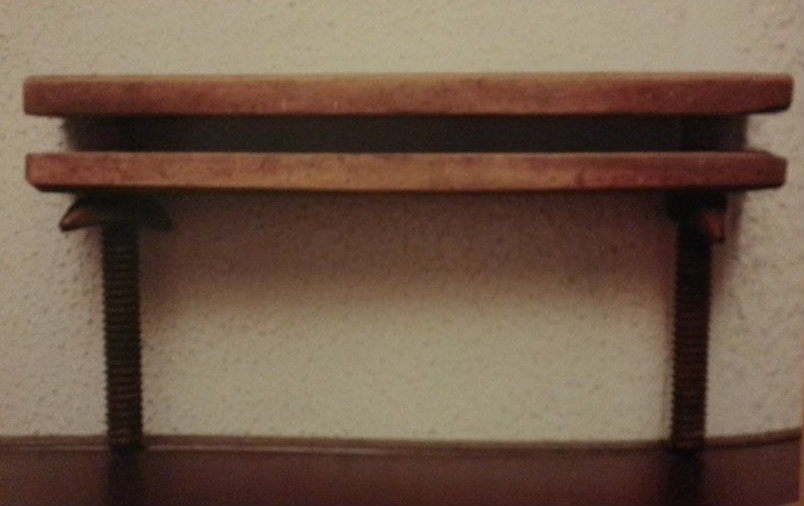
Bookbinding tool used by Bajram Jusuf Doli (mucelit) from Gjakova

Another characteristic seemingly unique to Gjakova was the bookbinders' craft (mucelits), dealing with the binding of different books and manuscripts; repairing old books damaged by long usage or any other physical damage; and, above all, copying the works of different authors, which they then distributed to libraries, or gave as gifts to their friends or to well-known scholars. This craft was practiced traditionally in Gjakova, from generation to generation by the members of Doli family until recently. In the second half of the 19th century, Bajram Jusuf Doli (1833–1917) practiced the professions of both bookbinder and teacher. Almost all the writing in Albanian with the Arabic alphabet such as those of Mullah Beqir, of Mullah Dervish, etc., were copied with his hand. He constructed the tools for binding the manuscripts and books himself. Over one hundred manuscripts that are kept in different collections in Kosovo have been copied and bound by him. About Mullah Bajram Efendi Doli, as a well-known copier of old oriental literature and other manuscripts written in Arabic Ottoman alphabet, we have data from different authors and old citizens. Mullah Bajram copied rare and unique specimens with elaborate handwriting, bound, sow and made the covers.

One of four works in manuscript, unknown until now, of Tahir Efendi Boshnjaku-Gjakova, found and identified recently, Hyda Rabbem (God is my Lord), written in lyrics, in Ottoman language in 1832, is kept only in three copies, two of which were copied by Bajram Jusuf Doli, whereas one by Muhamed Tahir Jaka, also from Gjakova. The son of Mullah Bajram, Mullah Hamdi Efendi Doli (1897–1994) was the last bookbinder from this family, who practiced this craft at home. He spent all his life on books, cleaned them page per page, folded them up and bound them with a special passion. The tools, he worked with were old and very interesting." He copied the books so nice that it was difficult to distinguish them from those of the printing house. He put them within the cover bound them with a needle and rope or with glue, according to the demands of the requester. He also arranged the archives of administrative documents, which he bound in the form of a book and was well paid for that, but he distributed this profit to the poor. The existence of this craft itself speaks of the high cultural-educational level of this prospering artisan and trade center (town).

=== Musical instruments ===
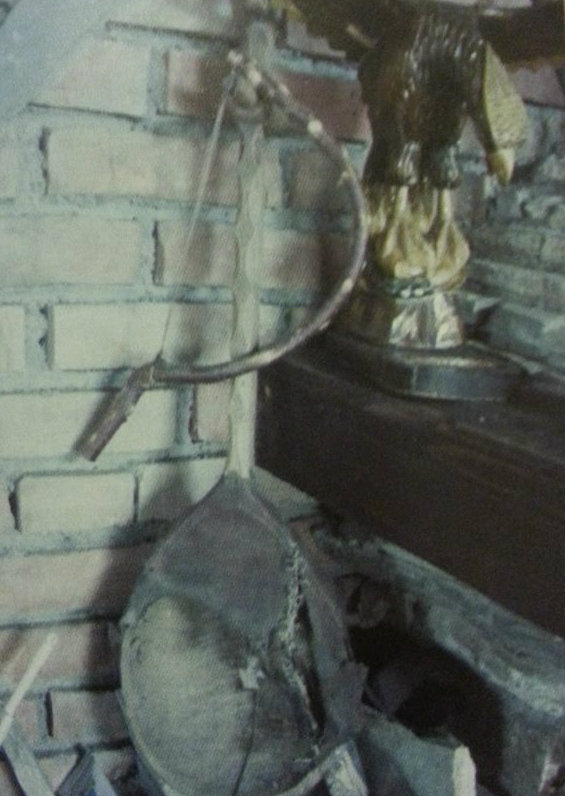
Two stringed lute, made in Gjakova

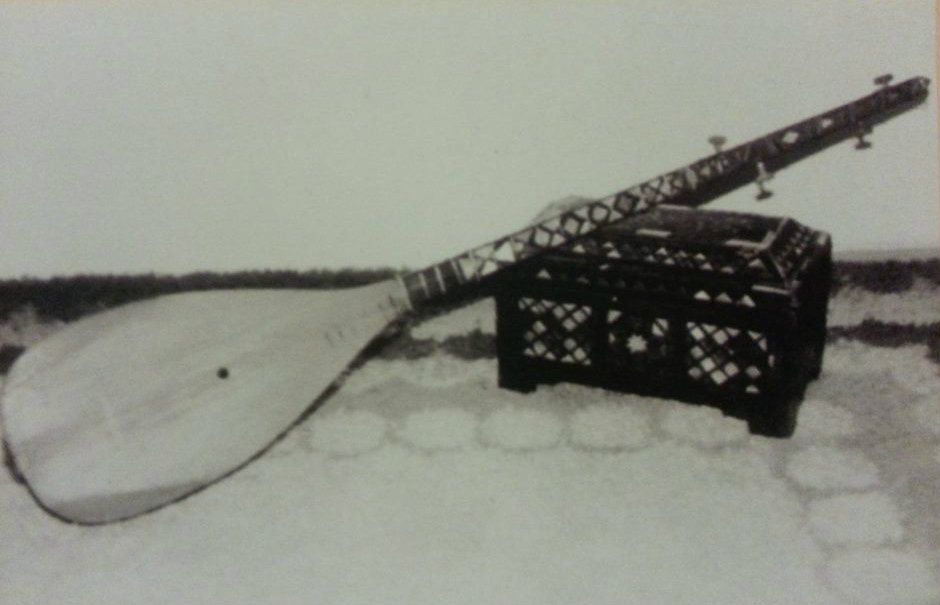
Sharkhi, made in Gjakova

Another craft, about which there are very few data available, is that of musical instruments production. We know only that in Gjakova used to live in the second half of the 19th century the well-known singer and musician Ramadan Gunga, who supported his family by his craft of a master of musical instruments production, such as sharkhis, two-stringed lutes, etc., that his beautiful sharkhis were decorated with a mother-of-pear eagle and with ivory spots, that he had a shop and that on the market day he played nice melodies to advertise his ware. We also know that his pupil and later his friend, the singer and instrumentalist, Din Bakija, had made himself a sharkhi and a personal box. This craft was practiced, along with their basic vocation, also by the carpenters and wood-carvers, who mostly dealt with mending the broken instruments, such as the well-known master in Gjakova, Rasim Tullumi. He had acquired his basic knowledge on the features of different kinds of wood that he used in different parts of a musical instrument, from his father Malush. In the production and repair of musical instruments Rasim was aided by his brother Ymer, who, as an instrumentalist of bugan (sort of a musical instrument), his father Malush, had brought him from Istanbul, participated in the musical group of Ymer Riza.

== Trade ==
According to some statistics in the early 20th century in Gjakova there were 400 craftsmen. The vigorous development of craftsmanship stimulated also the development of trade. "The people of Gjakova have a tendency agriculture, but they are more betrothed to trade. They go to distant places where they open their shops, inns etc. to provide for their living" was written in the yearbook (salname) of the vilayet of Kosova in 1887. The Gjakovar traders and craftsmen used to sell their product not only in Grand Bazaar, but also in many markets in other towns of Ottoman Empire, of Serbia and Austria. According to the facts, in the 1720s, the traders of Pristina and Gjakova transported their goods firstly to Dubrovnik and then to Italy. In 1803 the trader (merchant) from Gjakova, Jonuz Spahiu, had sold 114 bales of small leathers in Venice. In 1827 Salih Gjakova and Kërsto Gjakova sent gunpowder, rifles and flint stone to Sarajevo, whilst a year later, Hasan Gjakova and his nephew Hamza sent three bales of rifles to Serbia. According to the minutes of customs duty (cymryks) of Pozhega, of Aleksinac, of Kragujevac, of Mokra Gora, of Belgrade, etc., the traders from Gjakova sold their goods such as silk galloons, tobacco, rice, maize, eels, razors, soles, double-barrel sporting rifles, pistols, long rifles, cartridges, gunpowder, flint stones, wax, snuff, different leathers, salt, oil, cotton, cotton breast collars, cotton ribbons, silver galloons, scarfs, figs etc. Ali Sulejmani from Gjakova, in 1837, transported 56 loads of sheep leathers and other goods in an amount of 283.38 groshes, through Belgrade to Austria whereas in 1841, Halil Dobruna transported through Serbia to Austria galloons in an amount of 1800 groshes and 21,5 loads of Morocco leather (saftjan).

In Serbian folk songs Gjakova is mentioned as "the Albanian market" (Arnaut Pazar in Turkish). According to Mueller: “Sheep are developed, especially around Gjakova, and their wool makes a considerable item of export. Among better known traders, the rich family of Hajdar’s is mentioned, which dealt with wool foreign trade. They had their branches in Vidin, in Budapest, in Vienna, in Thessaloniki, in Istanbul etc. In addition to this, they had large properties in the district of Nish, Leskocvac and Vranje which they kept until 1878.

== Hostels ==
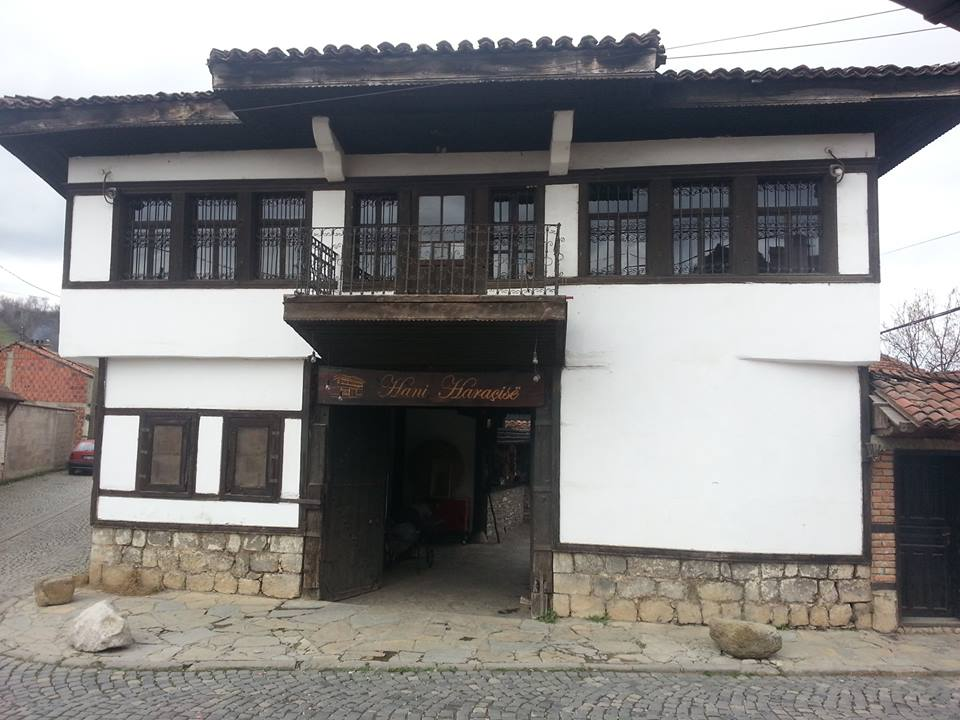
The Haraqia inn, Gjakova

The dense development of foreign trade suggested the need for hotel-keeping facilities, where the traders and pack animals, as the only means of goods transport, would rest. Almost all the houses of the citizens of Gjakova had alongside the large front door at the end of the large yard, a dwelling/housing facility, which consisted a room for known and unknown guests, with a fireplace, a bathroom and a separate toilet; a livery stable for placing the pack animals and the hayloft above it for keeping the animal food (nutrition), then the wheat wooden case (granary), maize case etc. In this part of the house the guests, who didn't manage to complete all the works during the market day, were placed and fed, which in some cases, when the Grand Bazaar reached its peak of development, lasted until three days sometimes it was organized even twice a week. The houses of beys, agas and of middle classes were in the form of towers with two or three floors, in a more beautiful style than those of the village, like fortresses with large yards, at the end of which was the guests' quarter (selamllek). Such was the yard of the house of Avdi beg in the center of town next to Hadum Mosque.

On the other hand, there were other public hotel-keeping facilities- the inns and caravanserais. Inns were similar in function to the present-day hotels, whilst caravanserais, as the word itself suggests, served for placing the passengers and their pack animals that participated in the caravan for carrying the goods. In 1835, the Haraqia Inn was known in Gjakova. During the 1870s and 1880s Gjakova had 16 inns. Mueller mentions in 1838 the large caravansary of Gjakova that hosted up to 100 guests traders with their animals and where the Armenian money ex-changers (sarafs) had their large halls as well. A hotel was also mentioned in Gjakova, which was state owned property to hotel-keepers with high fees, who often reached up to 300 thousand piastres a year. According to an old Byzantine tradition, which was developed even more in the period of Ottoman rule, each craft or trade had its street or road (square). This style of arrangement was organized by guilds, which had imposed a strict discipline and a rigorous control in production, both regarding the quality and quantity of the goods that were allowed to be produced and especially to brindle the competition between the craftsmen and the trader members of the guild.

== Shejh Emin Tekke ==
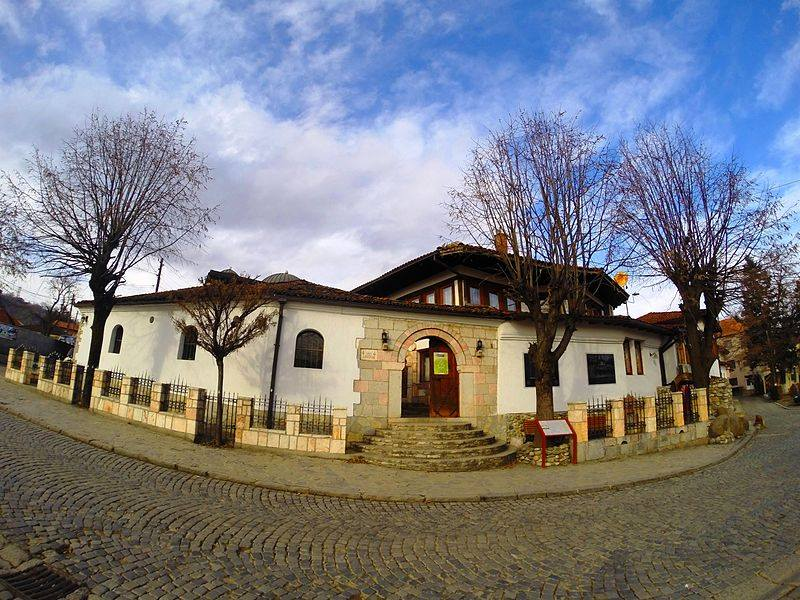
Shejh Emin Tekke

The Shejh Emin Tekke is situated at the complex of the Gjakova Big Bazaar, at the part called the "main market". It was built in the XVII ct. The building belongs to Saadi sect, and the constructor was Shejh Emin. His profession was also professional layer (called "kadi") educated at the Ottoman Empire centres. The inheritor of the tekke is now Shejh Ruzhdi. A characteristic of the tekke is that during its building it was applied the traditional building method. The foundation and the ground floor were built by the carved stone, while the first floor was built by bricks, the roof is a wooden construction with extended eaves and there are decorations on the walls and on the ceiling. On its floor it is situated the zone of "samahane" which is the praying quarter while the cupola is wood carved. Architecture concept of the object belongs to the citizen folk architecture and presents a complex of buildings with tekkes, tyrbes (small mausoleums), samahane (ritual prayer hall), fountains, houses and other following buildings. Interior and exterior are rich in carved woodwork. This building is explicit for its guestroom on the second floor shaped in octagon form. It's very interesting monument architecture wise, because it presents a rare sample of sacral architecture that will serve for studying, as tourism attraction, but also as a religious building encumbered with many tangible and spiritual heritage values.

== Bektashi Tekke ==
The Bektashi Tekke in Gjakova (Đakovica) was established in 1790, and it is the only building of its kind in Kosovo. It is the headquarters of the country's Islamic Sufi order. This building was reconstructed after being demolished during the last Kosovo conflict.

The message of Kosovo's Bektashi spiritual leader, father Mumin Lamas, “Without the homeland there is no religion.” This tekke—or temple—used to be an education center for many generations, but during the last conflict, its rich library was completely destroyed. “Bektashi is known as a mystic belief in the Muslim religion. Its aim is the spiritual sophistication of human kind.” It does not discriminate by race, gender, language or national origin. In the last war of Kosovo, the Tekke was burnt and destroyed, losing so a library with thousands of book and tens of manuscripts. "Everything was burnt, including 58 manuscripts. One of them contained 100 pages but there were also 400 pages manuscripts," said father Mumin Lama.

On the right side of the temple, seven of Bektashi's nine fathers, who have served in this building since the 17th century, are buried. Father Qazim Bakalli is buried here.

The building is home to Gjakova’s mystical Bektashi order, and is painted in the traditional colors of white and green. Located in the centre of the Çarshia e Madhe, it's open by appointment, and is under the leadership of Baba Mumin Lama. Like all other Bektashi tekkes, it is open for men and women to pray at the same time and is the property of all believers.

== Clock tower ==
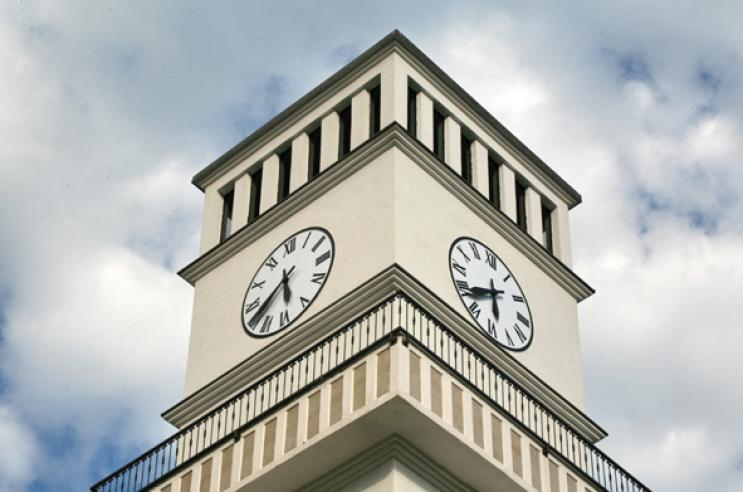
Gjakova's clock tower

A clock tower stands in the historic centre of the Grand Bazaar, at a place known as the “Field of the Clock“. According to the Islamic calendar it was built in the year 1002, which is 1597 in the Gregorian calendar. As a town experiencing rapid economic development, Gjakova acquired its clock tower shortly after the construction of the Hadum Mosque. The building was destroyed during the Balkan wars (1912). The belfry was removed and transported to Montenegro. A new tower close to the foundations of the previous clock tower was erected recently, with the intention of recreating the original building on the basis of archived photographic material. The tower is a square building with 4.10 m long sides, reaching a height of about 30 m. The construction is mainly of stone, with the walls up to the observation area in a combination of stone and brick: the part of the tower above the observation area is wooden. The roof is covered with lead. On the western façade of this reconstructed tower are some inscribed stones from the original tower.

== See also ==
- Bazaar
- Gjakova
