= Lukare =

Coordinates: 43°04′04.08″N 20°27′51.84″E

- Village (Selo)
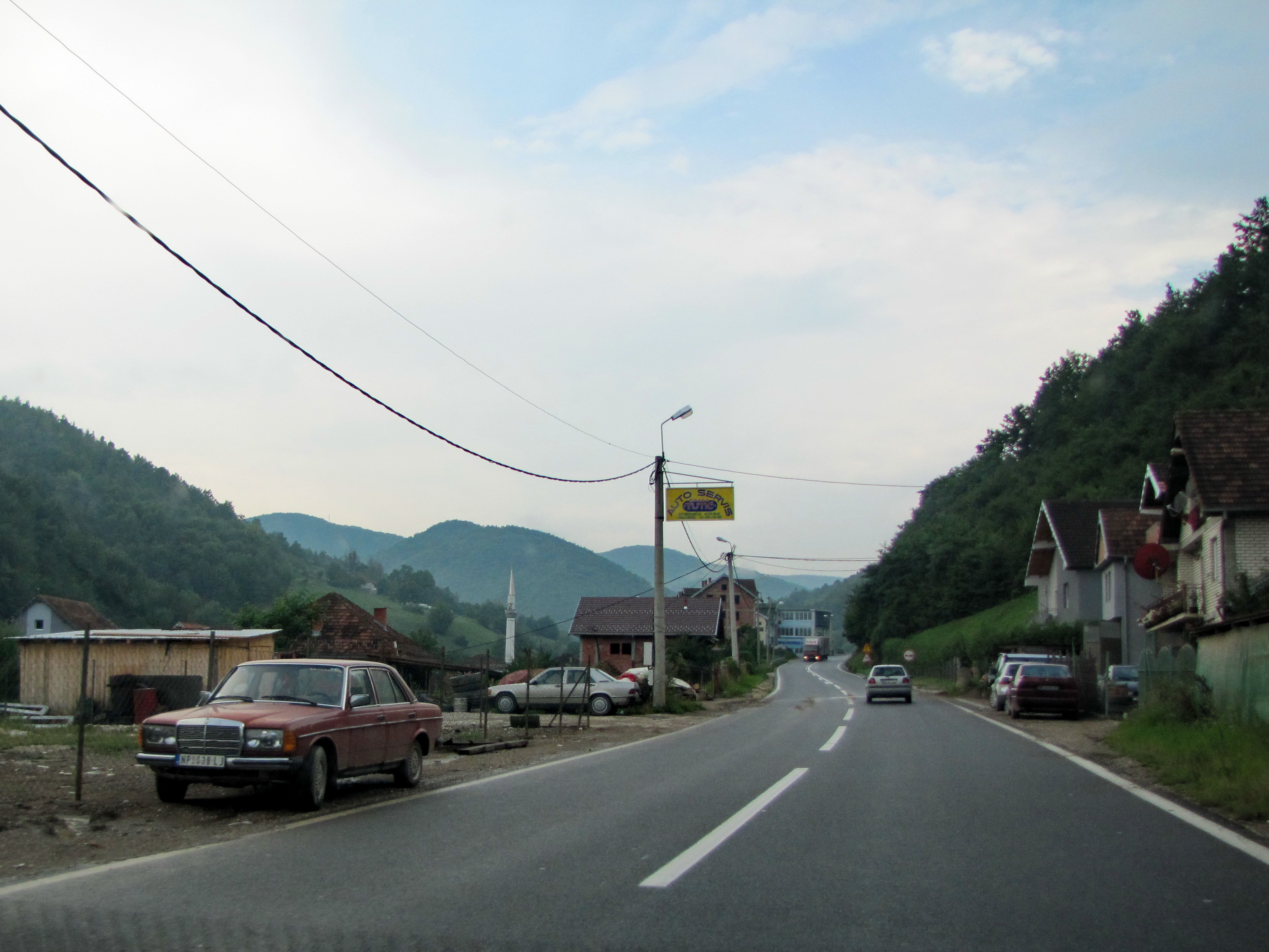
- Interactive map of Lukare
- Country: Serbia
- Time zone: UTC+1 (CET)
  - Summer (DST): UTC+2 (CEST)

Lukare is a village in Novi Pazar, Serbia. Its population is 489, with 452 Bosniaks.

== Notable people ==
- Tahir Efendi Gjakova, Albanian clergyman
