= Hadum Mosque =

Mosque in Gjakova, Kosovo

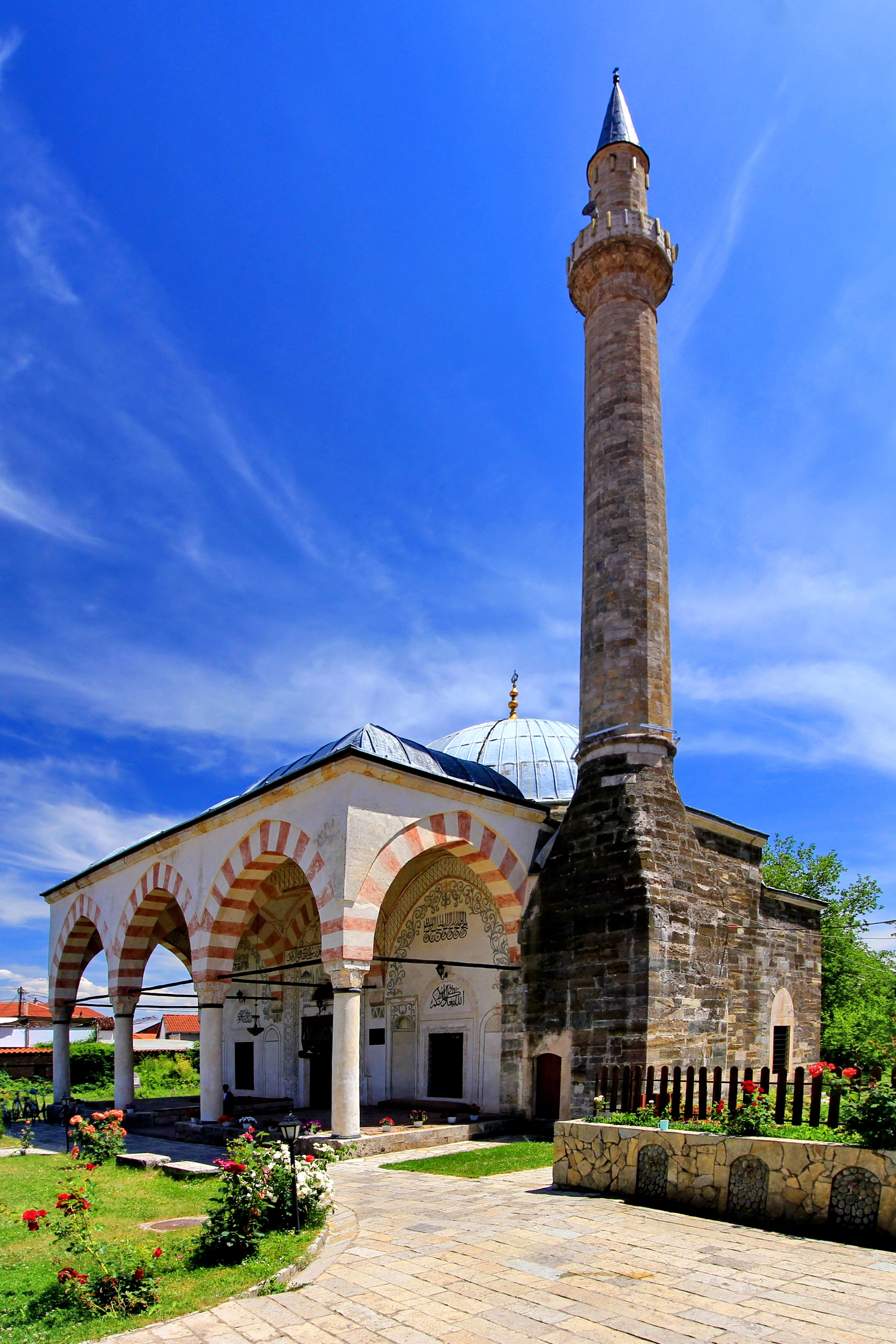

- Location within Kosovo

Religion
- Affiliation: Sunni Islam

Location
- Location: Gjakova
- Country: Kosovo
- Coordinates: 42.3792°N 20.4273°E

Architecture
- Type: mosque
- Style: Ottoman
- Completed: 1595; 431 years ago

Specifications
- Dome height (outer): 12.6 m (41 ft)
- Dome dia. (inner): 13.5 m (44 ft)
- Minaret: 1

Cultural Heritage under Permanent Protection
- Official name: Xhamia e Hadum Agës
- Type: Architectural Heritage: Monument/Ensemble
- Reference no.: 602

The Hadum Mosque (Albanian: Xhamia e Hadumit; Turkish: Hadım Camisi) in Gjakova, Kosovo was built in the last decade of the 16th century (1594/95) and was financed by Hadum Sylejman Efendia – Hadum Aga, which explains the name of the mosque. The mosque was built on the property of Jakë Vula and is located in the Old Bazaar. Evliya Çelebi said that around the plain of Jak Vula and Hadum Mosque were 2000 houses, some masjid and two monumental mosques, inns covered in lead, a beautiful hamam and 300 shops.

A rectangular, dome-covered structure, it belongs to the classic forms of mosque of the Islamic-Kosovar style. Around the mosque there are tombs with sculpted decorations and engraved with epithets in the old Ottoman language. The tombs belonged to the most respected families in Gjakova. There also used to be a "hamam", but it was destroyed during World War II. The entrances are covered with floral paintings, geometrical shapes, citations from the Kur'an and arabesques. In 1999, the surrounding complex was burned to the ground and only the mosque and the minaret along with some damaged arabesques survived.

== Architecture ==
The architecture of this mosque is one of the most interesting ones in Kosovo. It has the classic form of the Islamic-Kosovar style. The mosque has a prayer hall, the hajat (lobby) and the minaret. It is a typical Ottoman culture influenced building.

=== Prayer hall ===
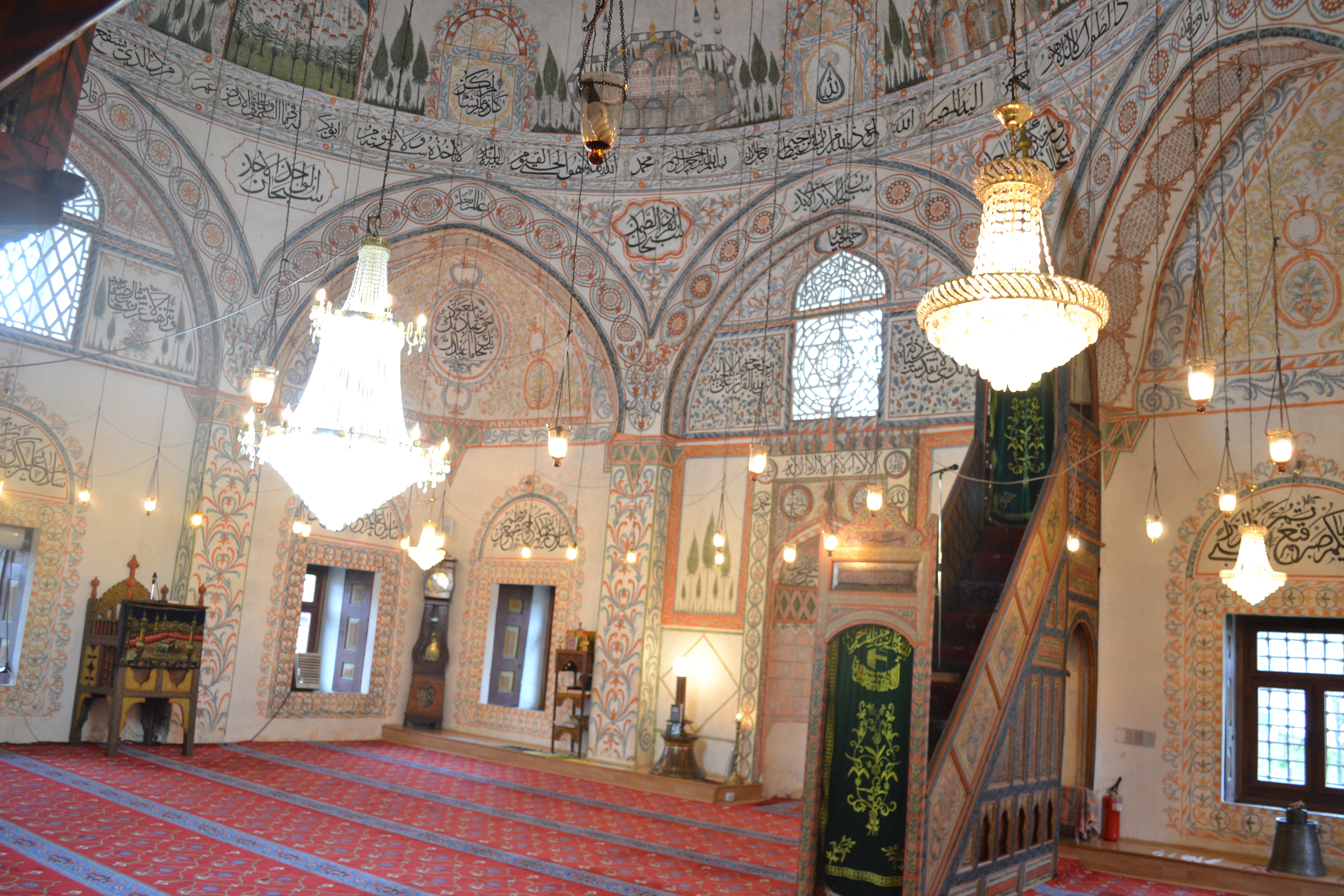
Prayer Hall in Hadum Mosque

This hall has a square plan and is made of one single volume. It is covered with a dome raising directly on pendentives. On the corners of the bearing wall, it has cubicles constructed directly on it. This specific construction presents a unique building setting in Kosovo. The dome has a diameter of 13,5m, while the height from the floor to the ceiling is 12,6m. It is particularly worth noting that the dome that is constructed on top of construction consisted of eight solid pilasters and pendentives. The hall receives light from 11 windows. Each surface of the cube, except the north-western surface, has three windows. These windows are placed in two rows, shaped as a triangle. The first row contains two windows covered with architraves and they contain metal railings, while the second row has only one window covered with a pointy arch.

=== Mihrab and mimber ===
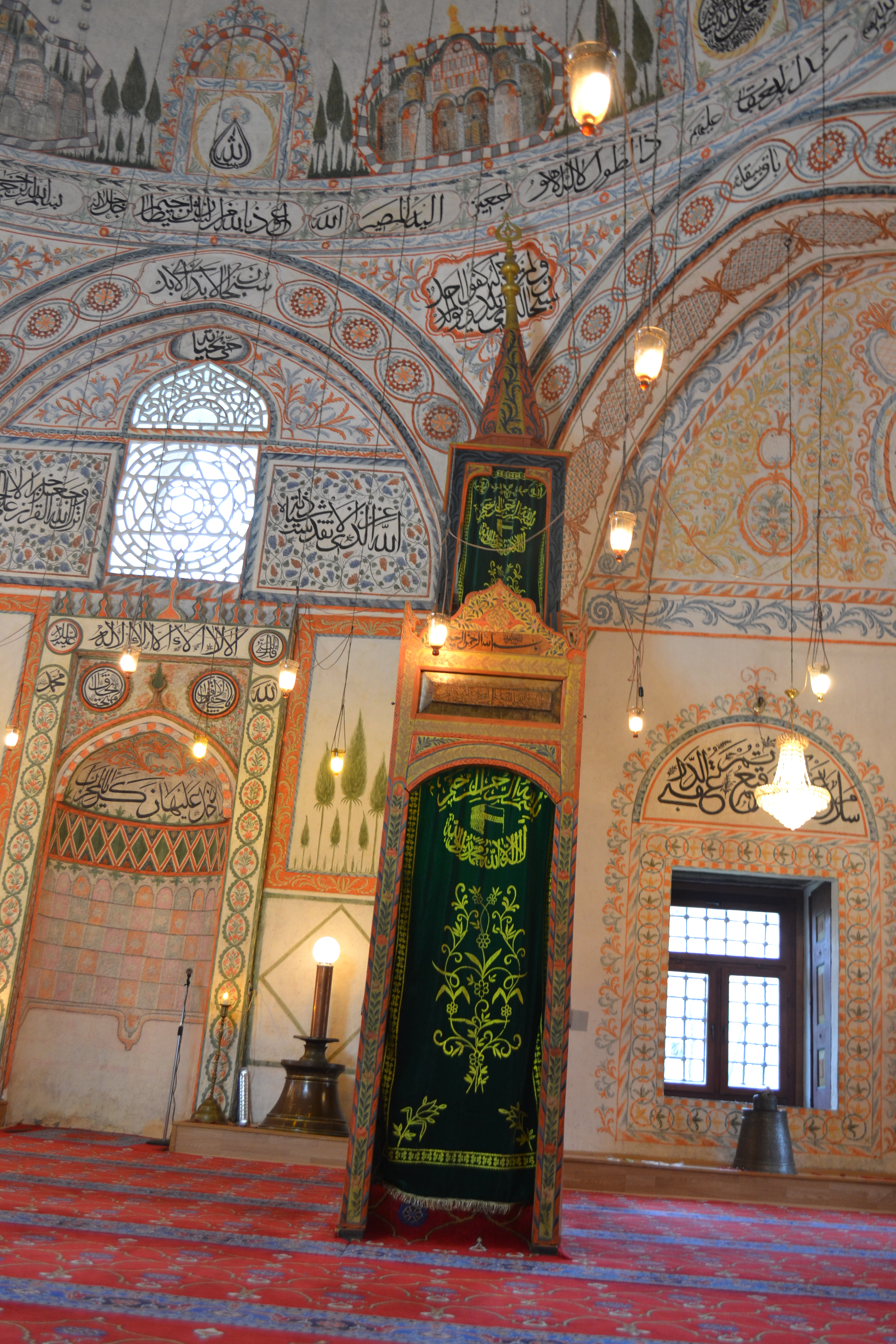
Mihrab and Mimber

The Hadum Mosque features a mihrab facing the entrance. Mihrab is positioned in the center of the south-eastern wall, towards Mecca. This element is nicked into the wall forming a niche which ends in the upper part in form of the semi-cone. On the right side of mihrab is a mimber, which is used for preaching. Mimber, which serves for preaching, consists of : the door, the stairs and balldahin and it is entirely made of wood. The tectonic of this element is presented through paintings and carvings.

=== Mahfil/Gallery ===
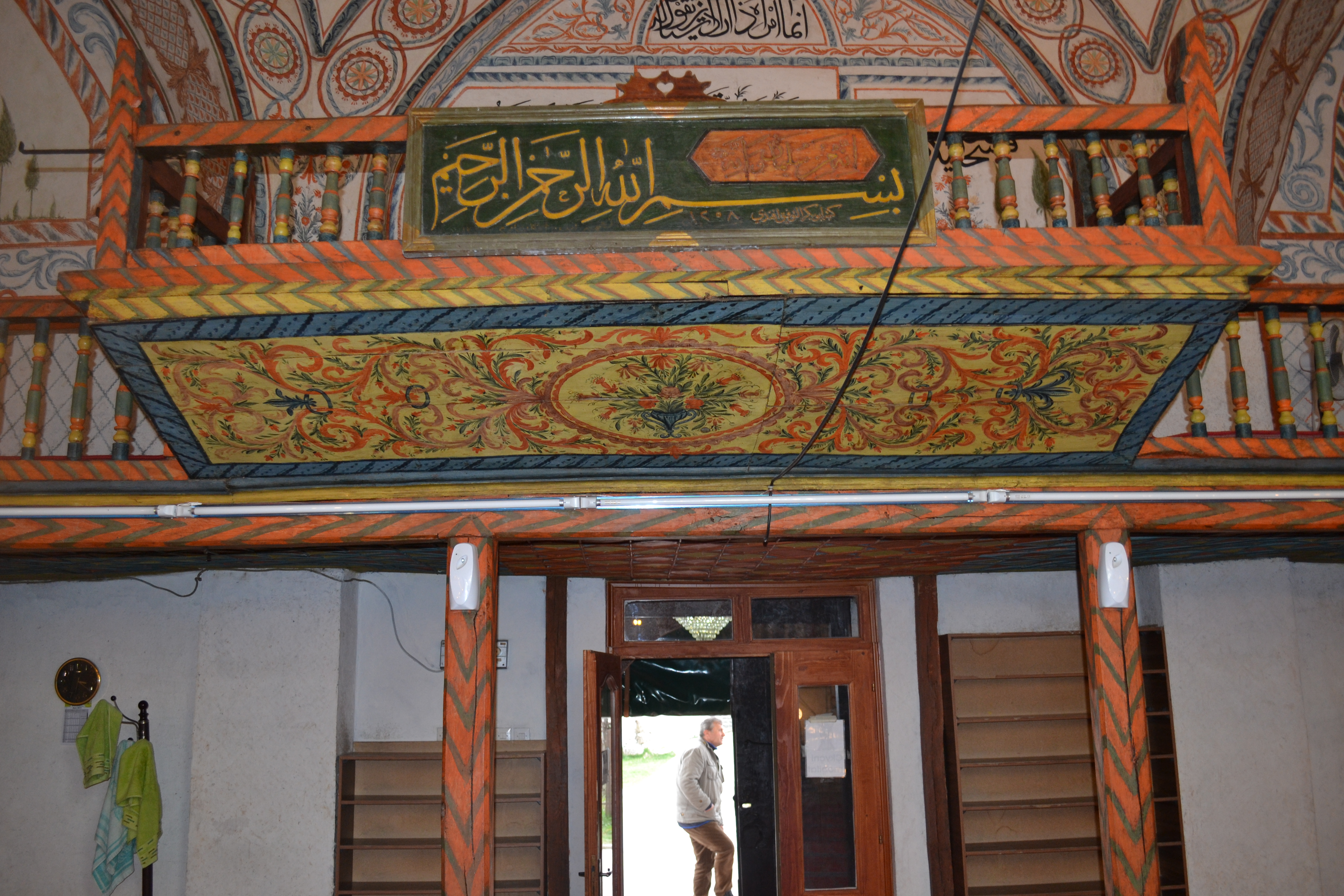
Mahfil/Gallery in Hadumi Mosque

Mahfil is made entirely of wood, and it is supported by portrayed wooden columns. Mahfil or the gallery, as a constructive, architectural and functional part of the mosque, enriches and breaks the monotony of the volume of prayer hall. It has plastic and painted decorations. The gallery is placed on the north-western side of the mosque, over the entrance into the prayer hall and it stretches along all of its width. It can be reached through the minaret stairs. It is supported by the north-western wall and the wooden columns. Mahfil is accessed through minaret staircase. Similar to the other parts of the mosque, mahfil, too, is painted with floral motifs.

=== Hajat portico ===
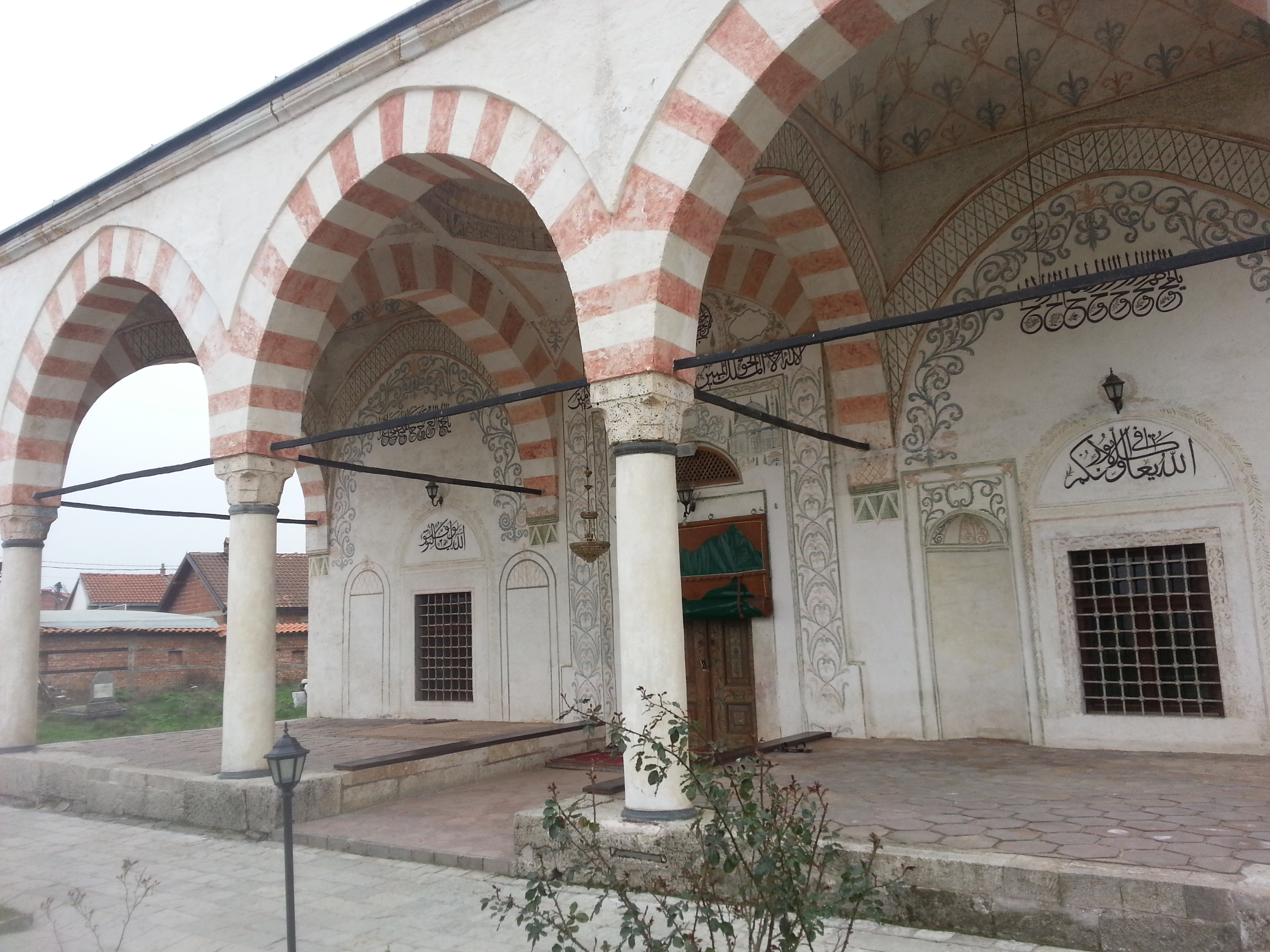
Hajat portico of Hadum Mosque

The portico is located on the north-western façade and is of traditional shape, which is found in classical and monumental buildings of this type. If there is not enough space in the praying hall or when one arrives late, the portico is used for the namaz prayer. The portico is also used for prayer rituals. It is covered with three small domes covered with lead. It can be entered from the outside, and the prayer hall can be entered through the portico. The middle part of the vestibule splits it into two areas which serve as an entry into the prayer hall. The floor used to be covered with hexagonal terracotta slabs, and it serves as a podium and a base for the column arcades. The portico’s columns do not have bases but they are made of three parts of the massive stones. The decorative elements of these columns are brass rings.

=== Minaret ===
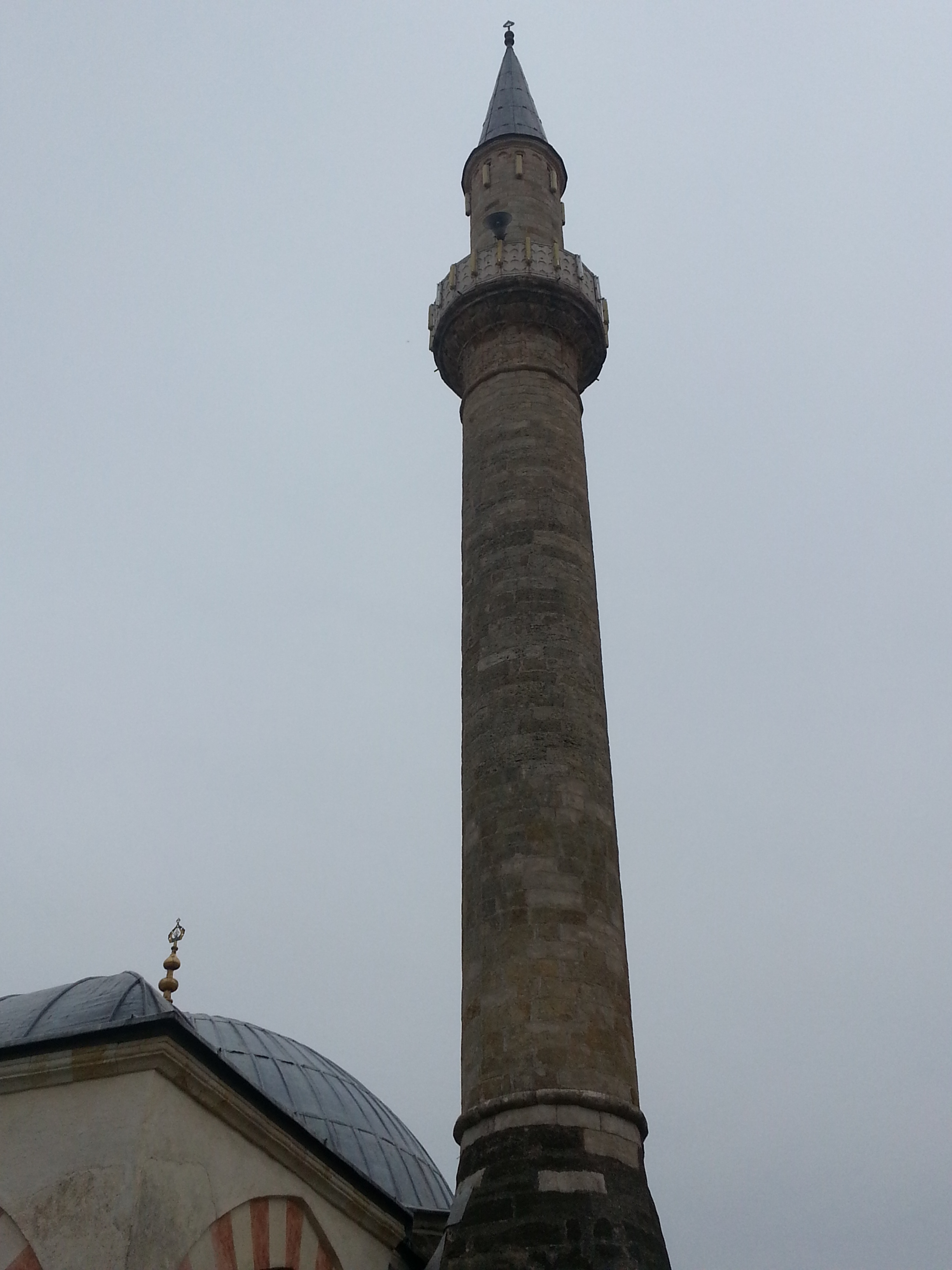
The minaret of Hadum Mosque

The minaret is a key component of the plan of mosque, and it is placed on the right side of the prayer hall. The minaret is entered through two small entries. One of the doors is located in the inner part of the mosque, the other in the outer part. The outer is used to access the minaret from mahfil, or vice versa. The shaft of the minaret diminishes to the second cornice becoming slightly narrower. The minaret sherefe (drum) is where the polygonal shaft ends. Sherefe is built from a few rows of stones as to form a balcony, which allows enough moving space for the imam to move during a religious rite, such as calling the worshippers for prayer – Ezan. The staircase of the minaret provides access to the sherefe. This staircase, along with the walls, is built of monolith stone.

=== Mural decorations – Arabesques ===
Hadum Mosques features paintings and arabesques which are also found on the walls of Islamic-Albanian sacral buildings. The interior of the domes is filled with murals of secco (dry plaster) techniques. The main motifes are stylized landscapes (in some cases with motifs of folk architecture, of kullas of Dukagin plain) with cypress trees, still nature, stars, motifs of architectural religious buildings – mosques, floral ornaments, geometrical figures and quotations for Qur'an. The mural paintings are more present in mihrab, mimber, mahfil, the crown, niches, arches and tropes. In the written names of Allah, Mohammed and his successors the red, blue, green, ochre, grey and black colors are dominant. This also shows the Islamic-Albanian baroque style. There are three layers of mural decorations. The first two layers are believed to belong to the 17th or 18th century, while the third decorated layer, according to Hijri and the date written in the timpanonin, was built in 1844.

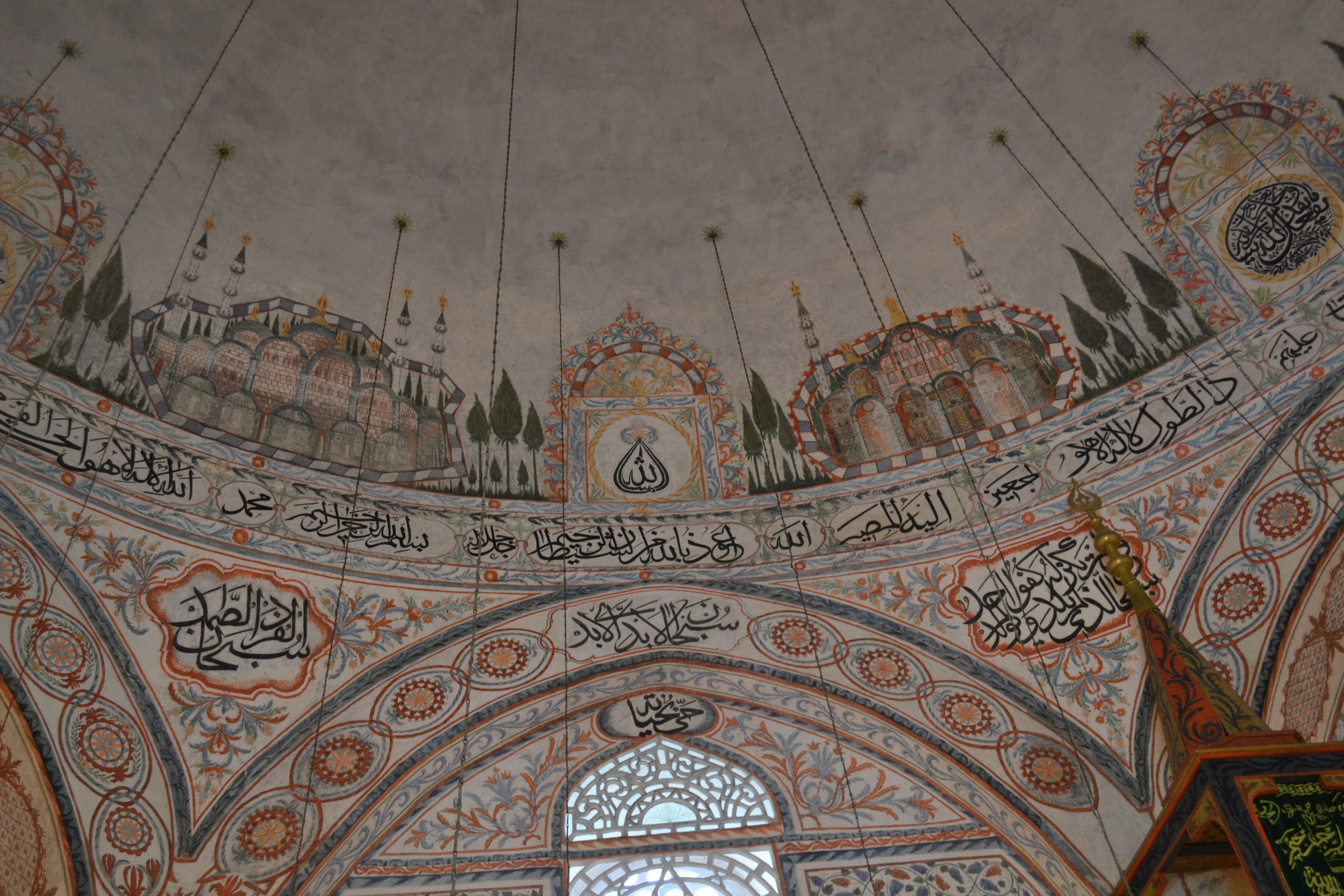
Mural decorations - Arabesques

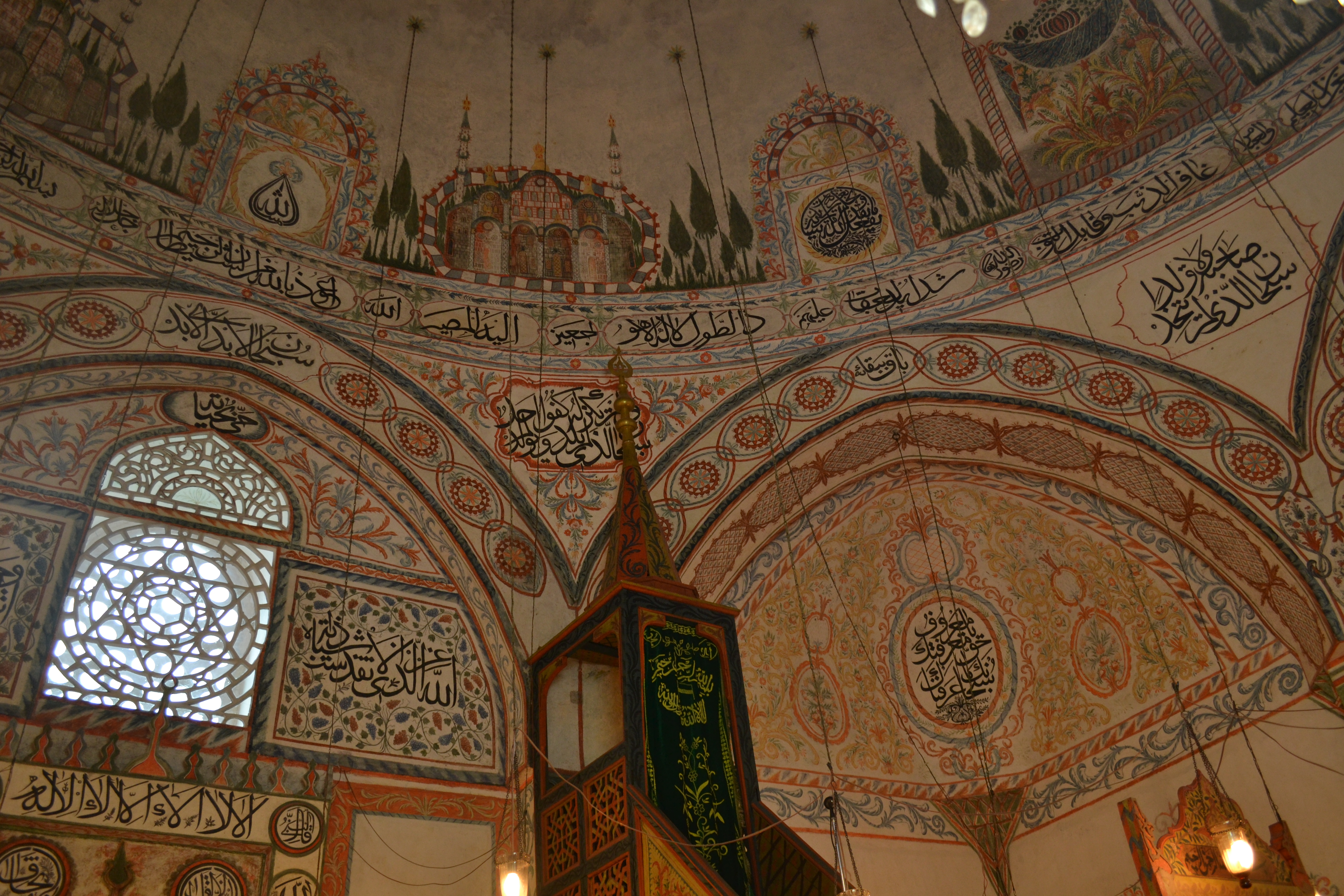
Hadum Mosque Arabesque

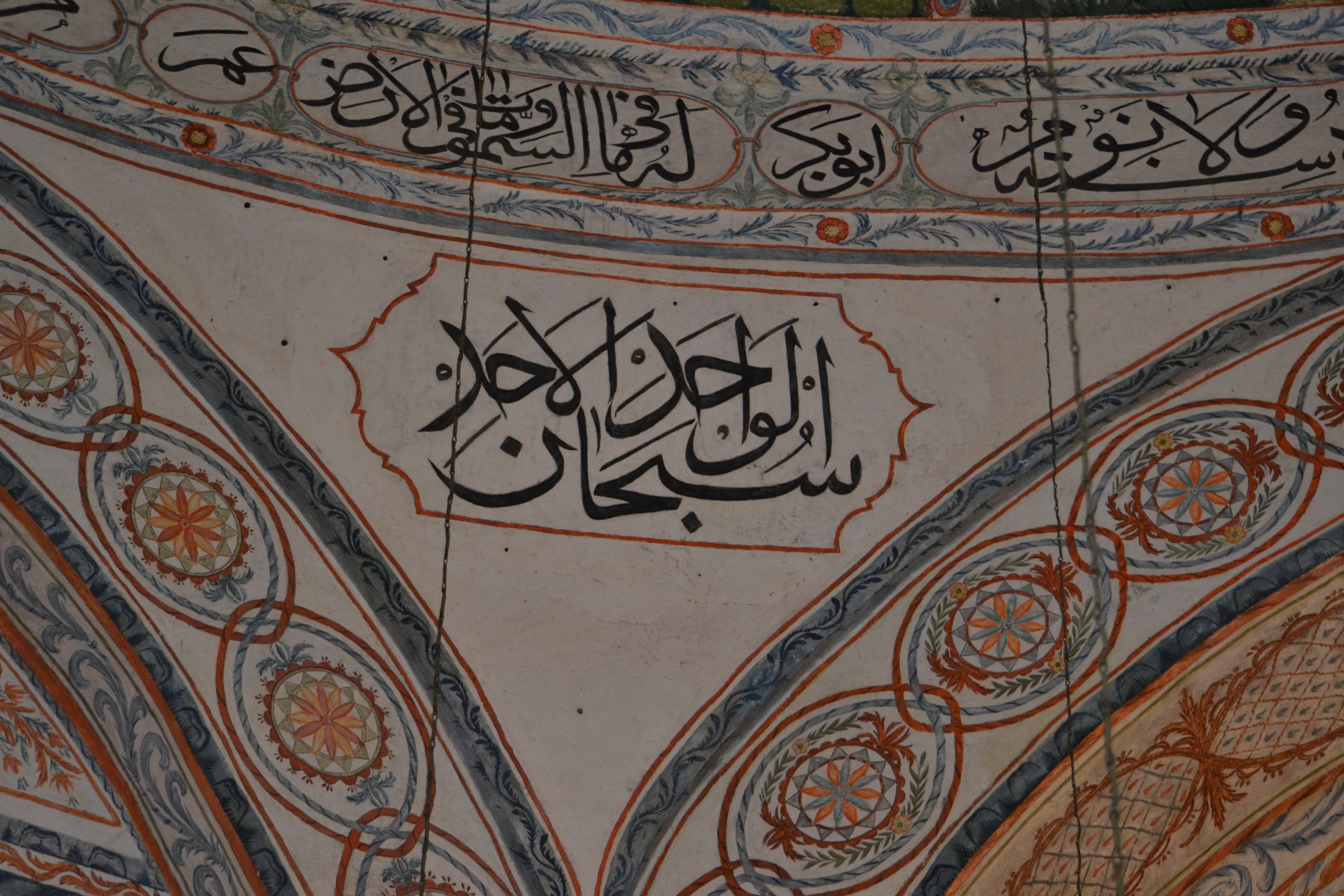
Sound tube

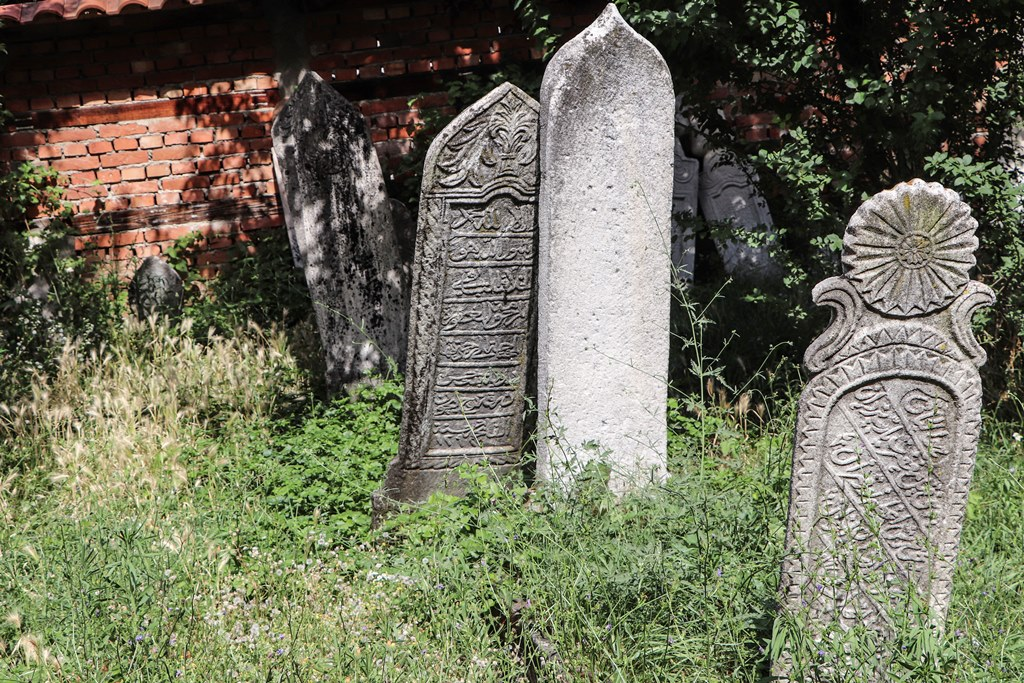
Tombs with sculpted decoration

=== Stonework ===
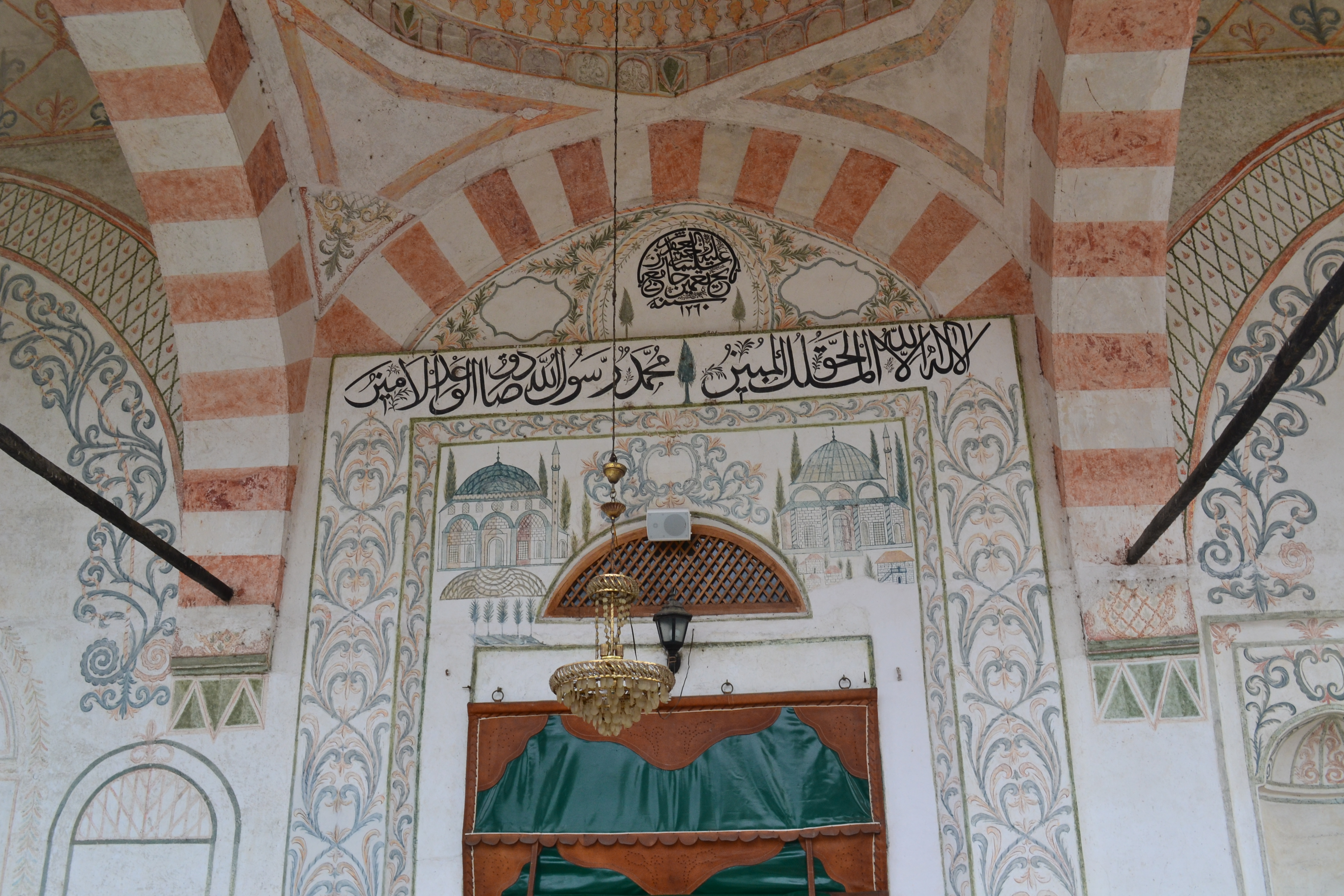
Stone work of Hadum Mosque

The stonework in the Hadum Mosque is in form of stalactites, designed on the parapet of the minaret balcony. All of these decorations are very detailed. The portico columns do have stylized flowers designed in detail, instead of plastic decorations. All four columns of the porch have the same decoration. Windows, the main portal, cornices of the prayer hall, portico and the parapet of the minaret balcony also have similar adornments as mentioned above. The mosque’s domes have a huge impact on adding dynamics and contrast to the building and giving it an aesthetic appearance. With its proportions, the complex around it and that it fits perfectly in The Old Bazaar, Gjakova.

== Damage and restoration work ==
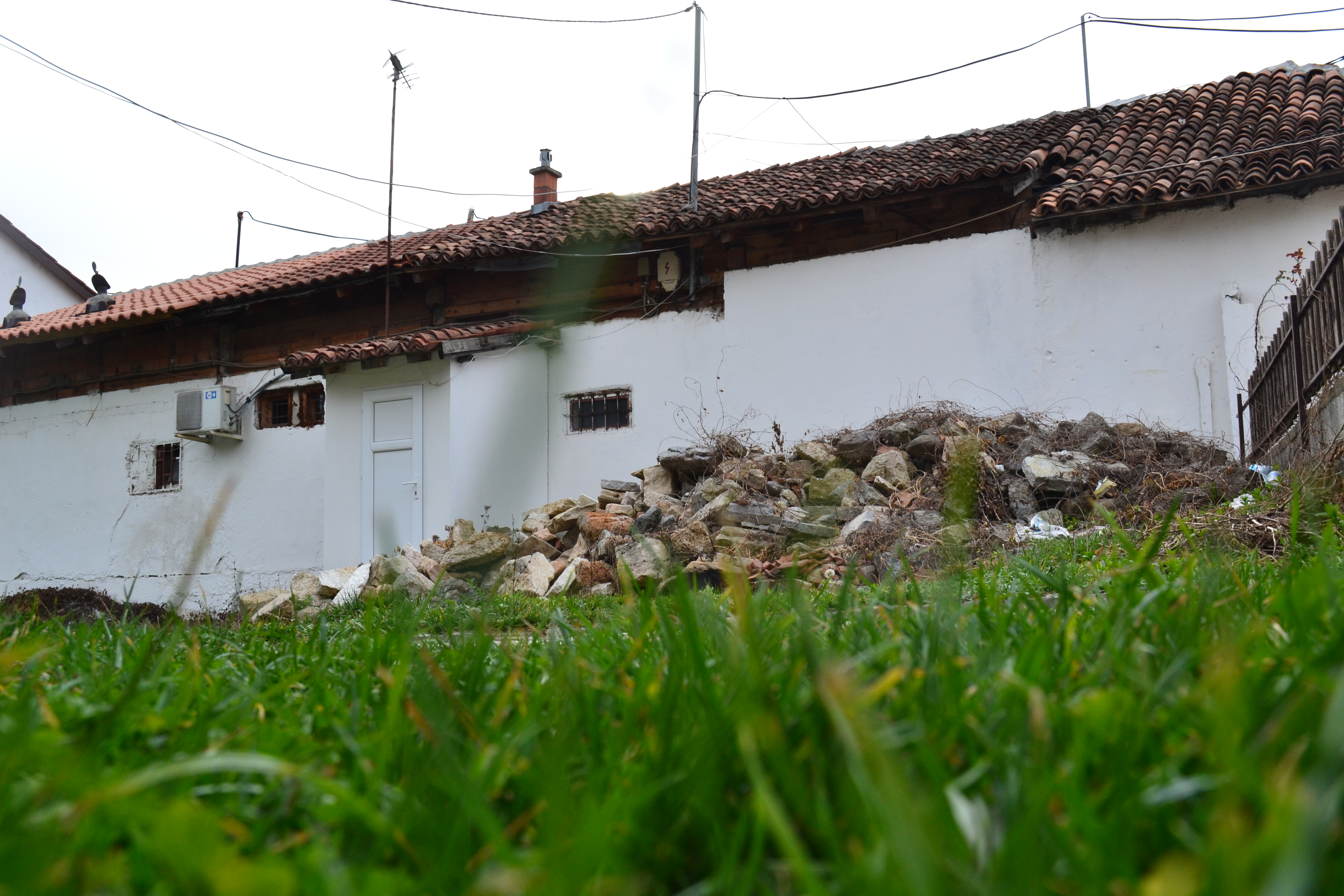
Quarry wastes from restoration

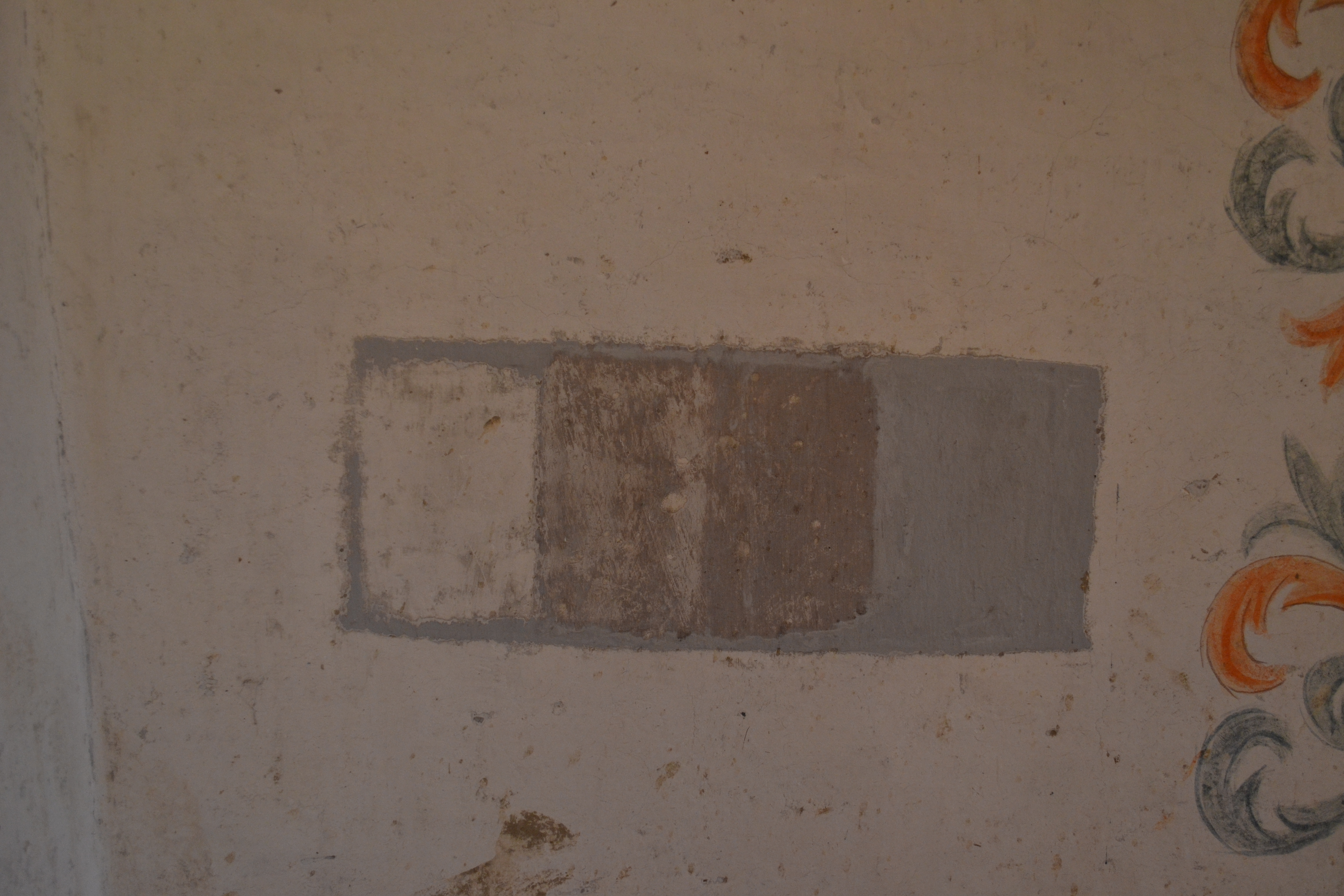
Mural Decorations – Arabesques in Hadumi Mosque

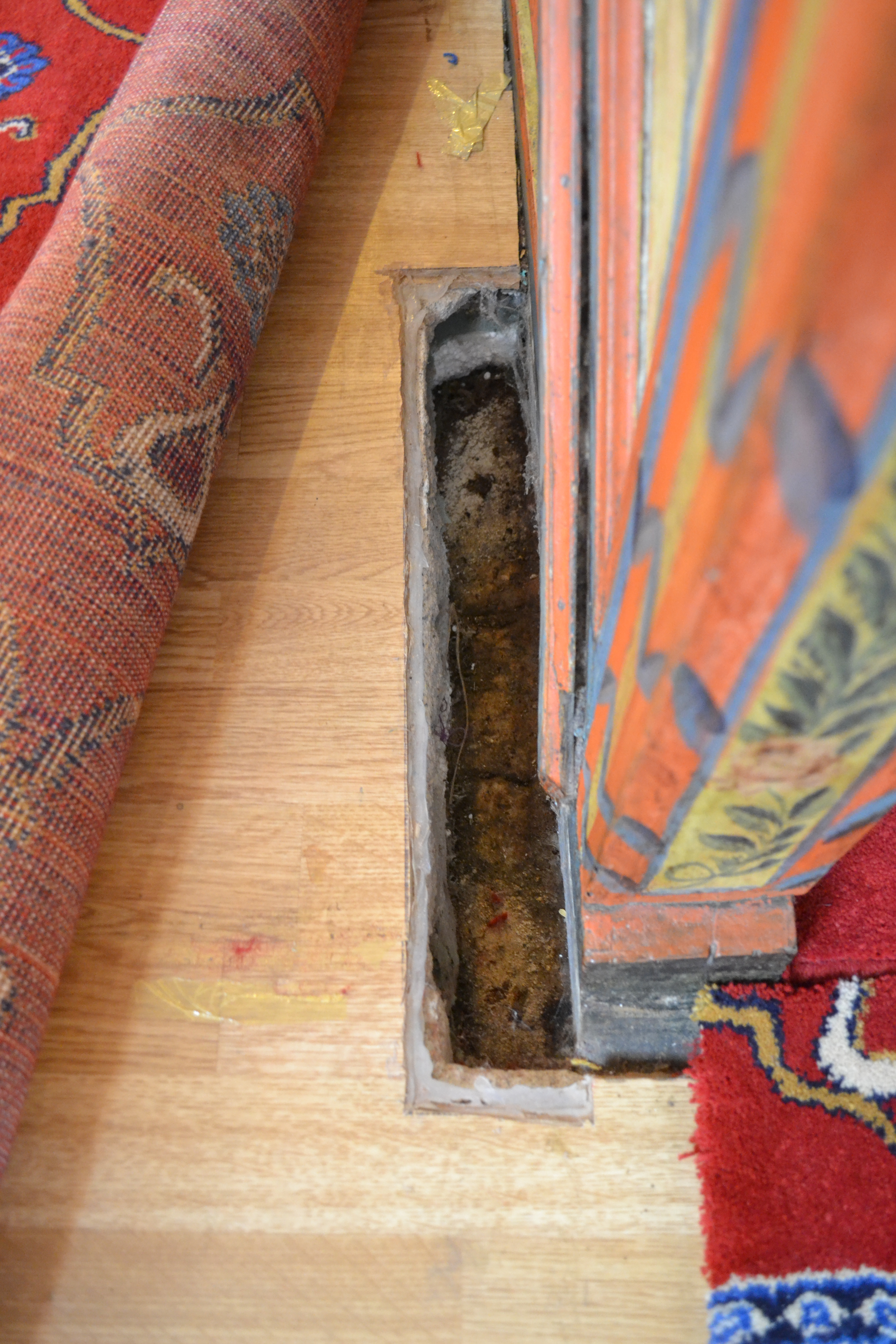
Repairment of the floor

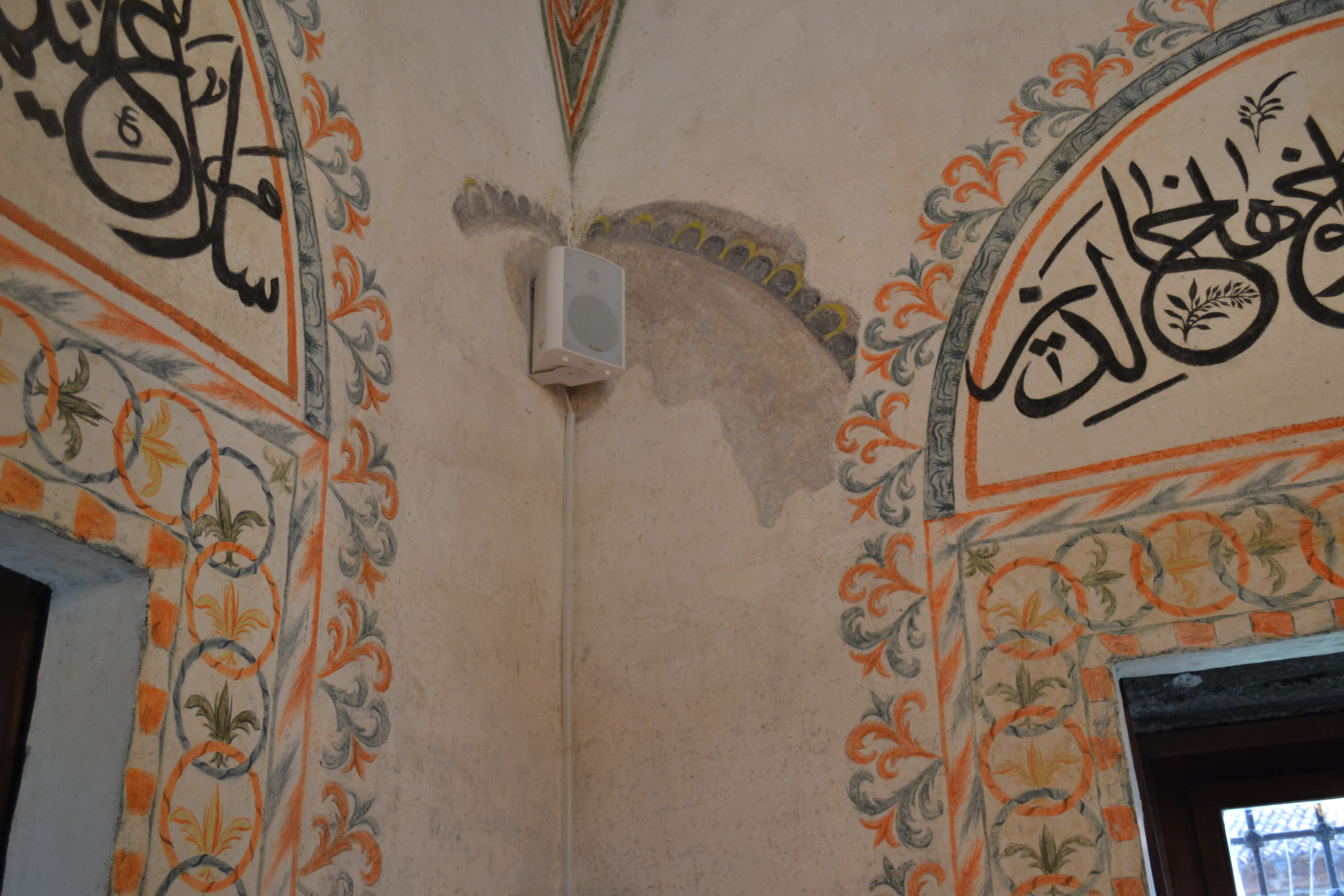
The part of the mysterious mural that was never repaired

In 1999, the evening when NATO’s intervention against Yugoslavia began, Serb police and the paramilitary began to set fire around the mosque complex. The fire caused a lot of damage to the complex. The library, the religious school, the wooden portico were burned down, and the mosque’s minaret was shot off. The library used to contain books and manuscripts that were hundreds of years old. These manuscripts contained the history of the mosque. As if this religious site had not suffered enough damages, in 2000 the Saudi Joint Relief Committee received permission to restore the complex. The “restoration” began with bulldozing of the already damaged library and religious school. The aim of this “restoration” was to clear all the buildings around the mosque and to build a new religious center. In 2000 the restoration project started, but because of the difficulties in finding skilled craftsmen and good material the restoration stopped in 2002. In 2003 Cultural Heritage without Borders, asked by KCHP, took over the restoration of the Hadum Mosque. The implementation phase included the restoration of the damaged minaret, dome, portico, windows, façades and the building of the library. This processes finished in 2005.

== See also ==
- Islam in Kosovo
- List of mosques in Kosovo
