= Tahir Efendi Gjakova =

Albanian clergyman of Kosovo (1770–1850 or 1835)

Efendi Tahir Gjakova
- Tahir efendi Boshnjaku
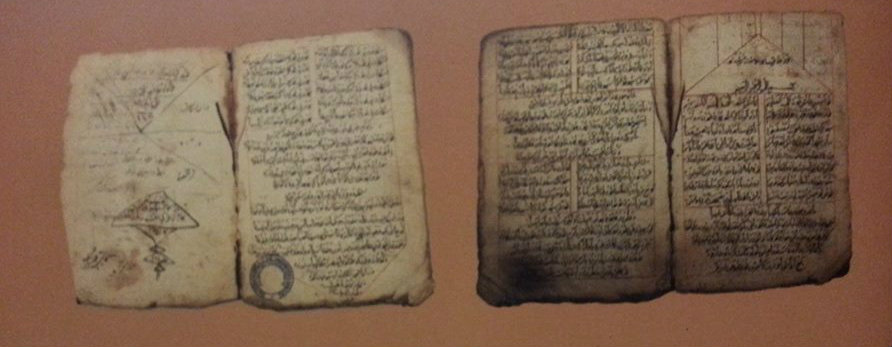
- Born: Tahir; 1770; Lukare, Sanjak of Novi Pazar, Ottoman Empire (modern Serbia)
- Died: 1850 or 1835; Gjakova, Ottoman Empire (modern Kosovo)
- Citizenship: Ottoman
- Occupation: Müderris
- Writing career
- Language: Albanian, Arabic, Persian, Turkish
- Genre: Ottoman poetry
- Notable work: Emni Vehbije
- Literary movement: Bejtexhi
- Title: Sheikh

Religious life
- Religion: Islam
- Denomination: Sunni
- Jurisprudence: Hanafi
- Tariqa: Bayramiyye
- Creed: Maturidi

Tahir Efendi Gjakova (1770–1850 or 1835), also known as Tahir Efendi Boshnjaku or The Great Efendi (Albanian: Efendiu i Madh), was an Albanian religious leader of the Yakova region in Kosovo, as well as one of the most known Albanian bejtexhinj. He lived and served as a clergyman in Yakova. The best known work from him, Emni Vehbije (The Offering) was published with Arabic alphabet in Istanbul in 1835. A reprint of it with Latin alphabet was done in 1907 in Sofia, Bulgaria.

== Life ==
Tahir Efendi is also referred as Tahir Efendi Boshnjaku (the Bosniak) because of his birthplace, the village of Lukare near Yeni Pazar, back then part of the Sanjak of Novi Pazar of the Bosnia Eyalet of the Ottoman Empire, Sandzak region (modern Serbia). He was a scion of the Saraçi clan, part of the Kastrati tribe. He is also known as the Great Efendi because he was the first müderris of the Small Madrasa of Gjakova, located in the "Mahmud Pasha" neighbourhood. He started the position right after finishing his studies in Istanbul in 1807. He also served as imam, poet, missionary, and educator.
Tahir Efendi was also a sheikh of the Bayramiye (Albanian: Bajramije) order of Sufism.

== Poetry ==
His most known poetic work Emni Vehbije, written in Northwestern Gheg Albanian. It contains advises and reminders in the context of the Islamic moral laws. It was finished and published initially in 1835 in Istanbul. Seventy-two years later (1907), it was published with the Latin alphabet, adapted by müderris Ismail Haxhi Tahir Gjakova. It was publisher by the "Bashkimi" society and printed in the "Mbrothësia" publishing house of the Albanian activist Kristo Luarasi. Tahir Efendi wrote poetry also in Turkish, Persian, and Arabic.
He prefaced his verses with Arabic meters: a form of Raml (Failatun, failatun, failat), followed by the basmala, hamdala, and the "Praise of the Prophet" (Peygamber). A lot of citations from the Quranic verses and the Prophet's hadith are invoked as well, providing various effects. A number of his works are lost, while some of the Arabic or Persian verses are discovered in the late decades. One recently found work of his is Hyda Rabbem (God is my Lord), written in lyrics, in Ottoman language and it dates to 1832. It is kept only in three copies, two of which were copied by Bajram Jusuf Doli, whereas one by Muhamed Tahir Jaka, also from Gjakova. Also of particular interest is the Gjakovar dialect of the Gheg Albanian language he used.
