= List of people from Gjakova =

The following are notable people who were either born, raised or have lived for a significant period of time in Gjakova.

- Abdullah (Dah) Polloshka, fighter against the Ottoman occupiers, National hero
- Amir Abrashi, Albanian footballer
- Fehmi Agani, Albanian sociologist, academic and politician
- Mahmut Bakalli, Kosovo Albanian politician, 5th president of the League of Communists of Kosovo
- Masar Caka, Albanian painter
- Gent Cakaj, Albanian minister for Europe and Foreign Affairs
- Lorik Cana, Albanian footballer and captain on National football team of Albania
- Bardhyl Çaushi, Kosovo Albanian dean of law of the University of Pristina
- Anton Çuni, Kosovar politician and military commander
- Bajram Curri, Albanian chieftain and politician, founding member of the Committee for the National Defence of Kosovo
- Mladen Dodić, Serbian football coach
- Božidar Delić (born 1956), retired Yugoslav general and Serbian politician
- Teki Dervishi, Albanian playwright
- Rauf Dhomi, Albanian composer
- Besim Dina, Albanian television host
- Shkelzen Doli, Albanian violinist in Vienna Philharmonic
- Abdullah Pashë Dreni, Albanian pasha
- Emin Duraku, Albanian partisan
- Vladimir Durković, Serbian football player and Olympic champion
- Bekim Fehmiu, Yugoslav-Albanian actor, the first Eastern European to star in Hollywood during the Cold War
- Ardian Gashi, Albanian-Norwegian footballer
- Nora Gjakova, Olympic judo champion
- Riza bej Gjakova, Albanian nationalist and guerrilla fighter
- Eros Grezda, Albanian footballer
- Besnik Hasi, Albanian footballer and coach
- Fadil Hoxha, first prime minister of AP Kosovo
- Atifete Jahjaga, former president of Kosovo
- Benet Kaci, Albanian media personality
- Valonis Kadrijaj, Albanian-German footballer
- Gjon Nikolle Kazazi, Albanian Catholic bishop of Skopje, known for discovering Meshari of Gjon Buzuku
- Ahmet Koronica, Albanian nationalist
- Ardian Kozniku, former Albanian-Croatian footballer
- Flaka Krelani, Albanian singer
- Naim Kryeziu, Albanian footballer, part of AS Roma's first Serie A win
- Burim Kukeli, Albanian footballer
- Gëzim Lala, Kosovar Albanian footballer who played for FK Galenika Zemun
- Mimoza Kusari Lila, Kosovo Albanian politician
- Albesian Mataj, one the youngest soldiers of the Kosovo Liberation Army who died on active duty
- Din Mehmeti, Albanian poet
- Avni Mula, Albanian musician
- Blerim Mula, Albanian footballer and manager
- Muslim Mulliqi, Albanian impressionist and expressionist painter
- Fadil Nimani, KLA fighter and NLA commander
- Dimitar Nikolić Obshti, Bulgarian national revolutionary
- Ismet Peja, Albanian folk singer
- Fanol Përdedaj, Albanian-German footballer
- Ali Podrimja, Albanian poet
- Mirlinda Kusari Purrini, Kosovo Albanian economist
- Jashar Salihu, political activist and KLA general
- Đokica Stanojević, Kosovo Serb politician
- Momir Stojanović, Serbian politician
- Sylejman Sylejmani, KLA commander, academic, and politician
- Aleksandar Tijanić, Serbian journalist and former RTS director
- Esat Valla, Albanian painter
- Miodrag Vlahović, Montenegrin former foreign minister
- Momir Vojvodić, Montenegrin Serb poet and politician
- Sulejman Vokshi (1815-1890), Albanian guerilla fighter
- Liza Vorfi, Albanian actress
