= Albania–Spain relations =

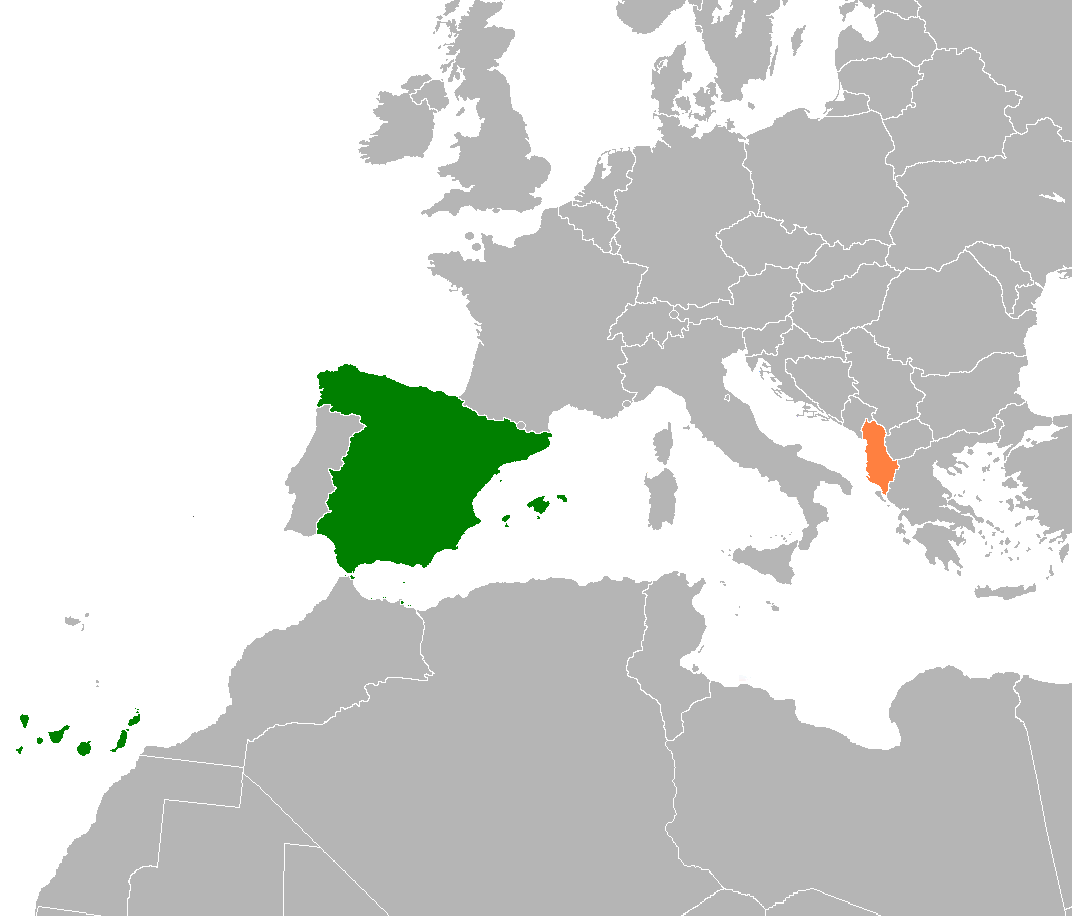
- Spain: Albania

Formal relations between Albania and Spain were established in 1986. Albania has an embassy in Madrid, and Spain has an embassy in Tirana.

The countries are both members of the North Atlantic Treaty Organization, the Organization for Security and Co-operation in Europe, and the Union for the Mediterranean. Spain does not recognize Kosovo as a sovereign state, which has led Albania to distance itself. Spain is neutral on Albania's EU accession.

== History ==
Before the modern era, the first relationship with the Spanish and Albania were documented in 1447, who, according to the archives of the Crown of Aragon located within Barcelona, exchanged 40 documents of letters, concessions., and treaties between 1447-1457. This diplomacy was primarily conducted between Alfonso V, or, Alfonso the Magnanimous, then the King of Aragon, Sardinia, Naples, Malta, and the Lord of Albania, Skanderbeg. The two rulers found many of their geopolitical interests to align, and the fruits of these negotiations was the Treaty of Gaeta (1451), in which Skanderbeg agreed to be Alfonso's vassal, primarily in exchange for protection against the Ottoman Empire and Republic of Venice.

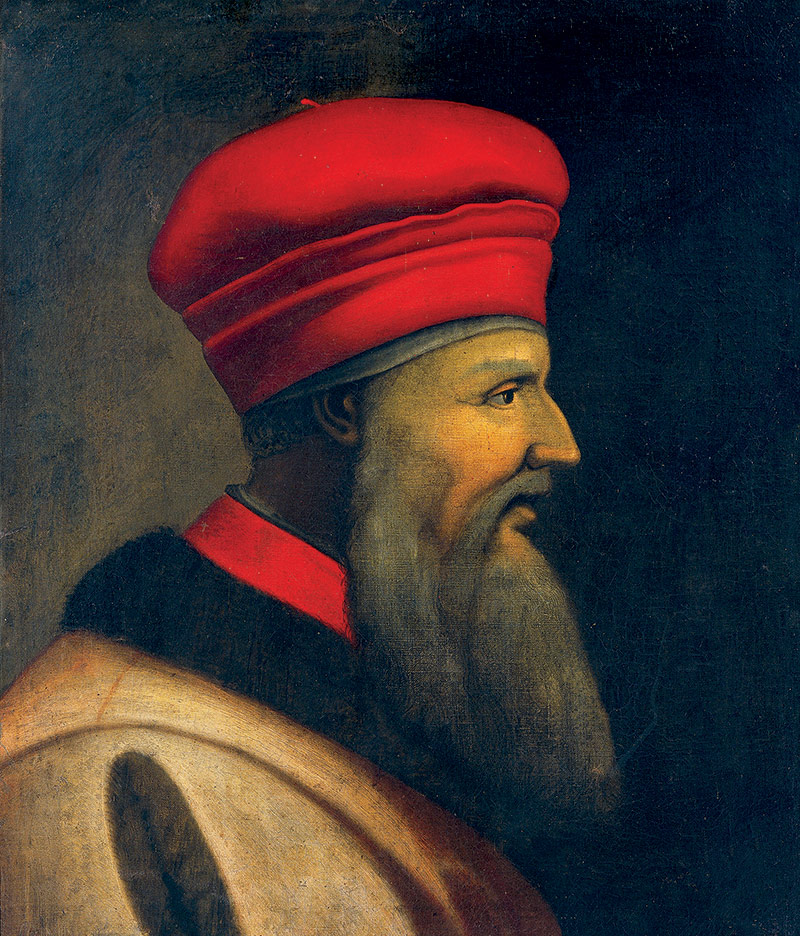
Skanderbeg by Antonio Maria Crespi (1613).

Modern relations between Albania and Spain originate since 27 August 1922, with the act of mutual recognition.

The diplomat Juan Pedro Aladro Kastriota was the pretender of the throne of Albania. Kastriota claimed descent from the medieval nobel Kastrioti family through his paternal grandmother.

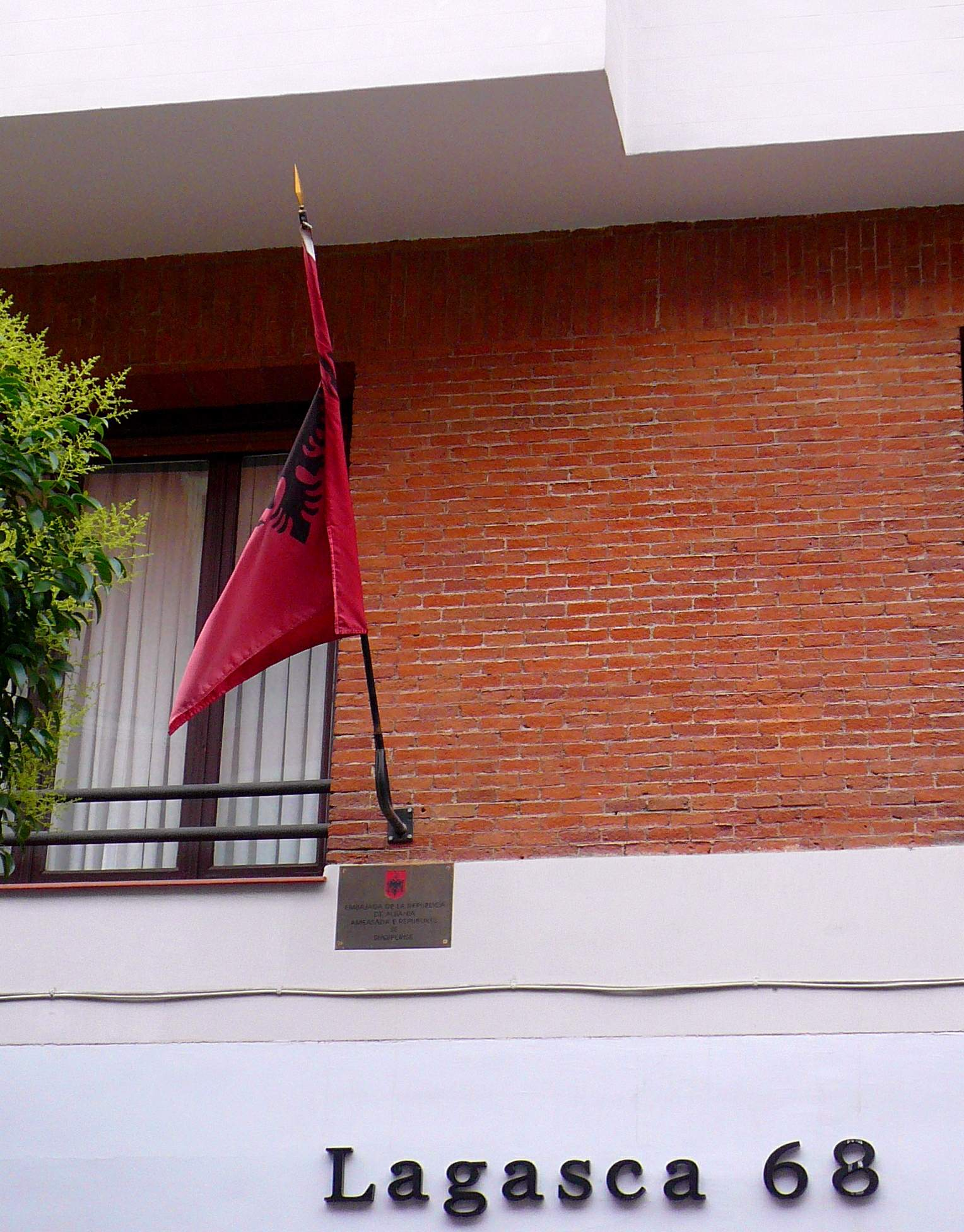
Embassy of Albania in Madrid

In April 1929 Spain opened its legation in Tirana. With the occupation of Albania by fascist Italy, relations were severed and Spain closed its legation in Tirana.

During the Spanish Civil War, many Albanians took part on this event as members of the International Brigades, such as Asim Vokshi who was a staff officer of the Garibaldi Battalion, scholar and anti-fascist activist Skënder Luarasi, and novelist Petro Marko, who was a volunteer of the republican force of the event. His best-known novel is titled Hasta La Vista.

For years, the Spanish government accused Albania of providing support to the FRAP. In 1977, first informal diplomatic contacts between both parties were channeled. Formal diplomatic relations between both countries were established in September 1986.

With the fall of the dictatorial regime in Albania, the relations between the two countries began to intensify rapidly and the two sides showed good will to get closer and cooperate closely and continuously.

== Economic relations ==
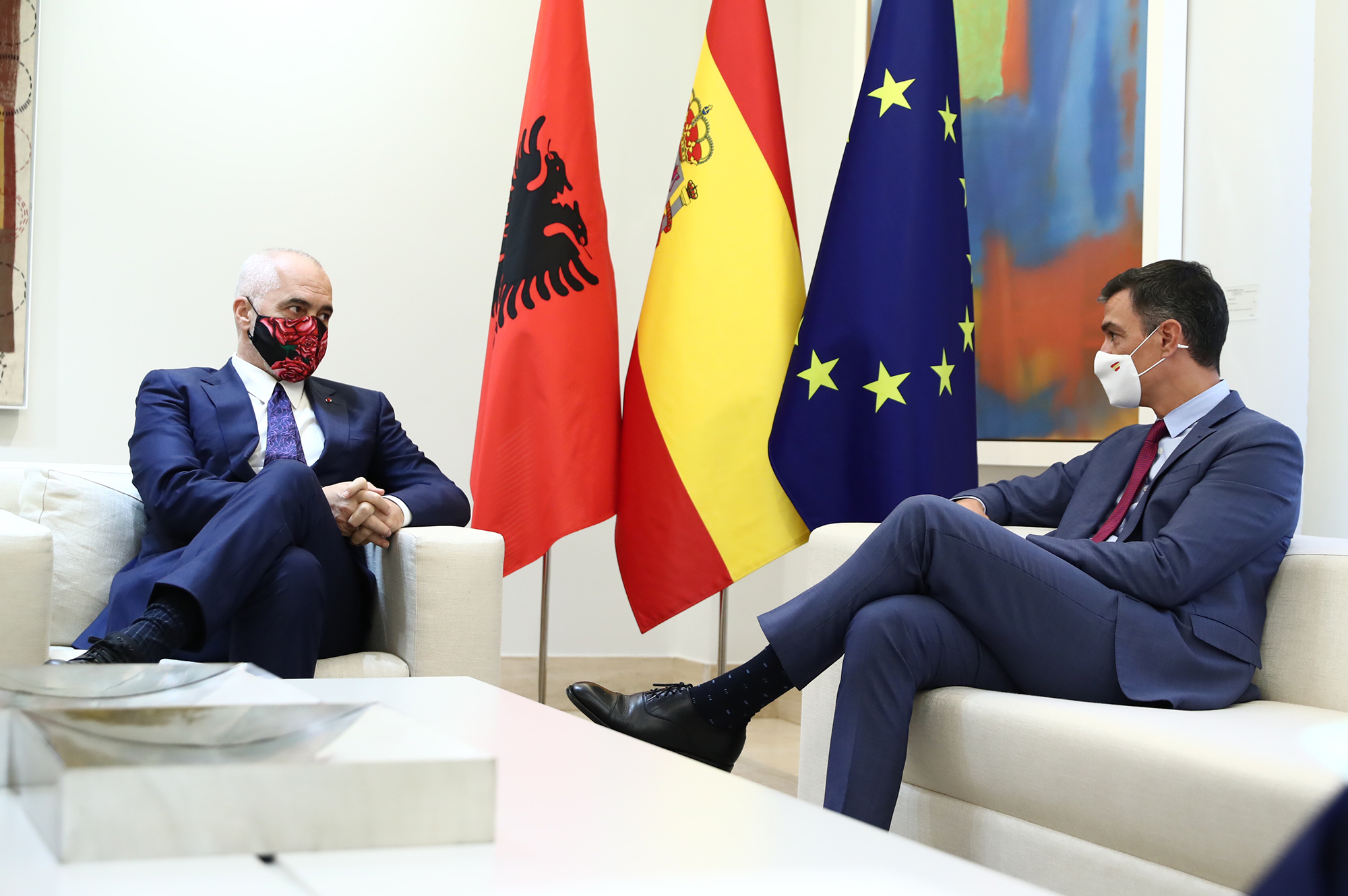
Prime Ministers Pedro Sánchez and Edi Rama during Rama's visit in Madrid in 2021

Since January 2020, Spain has been one of the countries with the highest growth of exports to Albania.

In 2021, Spanish exports to Albania amounted to 69.01 million euros, growing significantly compared to the previous year (63.6 million euros). As for Spanish imports from Albania, they rose in 2021 to 184.08 million euros, which is 23% more than in 2020.

Spanish is legally included in the main foreign languages recognized in the system of university and academic education in Albania. In September 2024, the Spanish National University of Distance Education opened a Centre of Study in Gjirokastra.

== Resident diplomatic missions ==
- Albania has an embassy in Madrid.
- Spain has an embassy in Tirana.

== See also ==
- Foreign relations of Albania
- Foreign relations of Spain
- Accession of Albania to the EU
- NATO-EU relations
