= List of FC Ingolstadt 04 seasons =

FC Ingolstadt 04 is a German football club based in Ingolstadt, Bavaria. The following is a list of each season completed by the club, inclusive of all major competitions.

== Key ==
Key to competitions

- Bundesliga (1. BL) – The top-flight of football in Germany, established in 1963.
- 2. Bundesliga (2. BL) – The second division of football in Germany, established in 1974.
- 3. Liga (3. L) – The third division of football in Germany, established in 2008.
- Regionalliga (RL) – The fourth division of football in Germany, established in 1964 and designated as the fourth tier in 2008.
- Bayernliga (OLB) – A fifth division of football in Germany, established in 1991.
- DFB-Pokal (DFBP) – The premier knockout cup competition in German football, first contested in 1935.
- UEFA Champions League (UCL) – The premier competition in European football since 1955. It went by the name of European Cup until 1992.
- UEFA Europa League (UEL) – The second-tier competition in European football since 1971. It went by the name of UEFA Cup until 2009.

Key to colors and symbols

1st or W	Winners
2nd or RU	Runners-up
3rd	Third place
↑	Promoted
↓	Relegated
♦	League Golden Boot
Italics	Ongoing competition

Key to league record

- Season = The year and article of the season
- Div = Division/level on pyramid
- League = League name
- Pld = Games played
- W = Games won
- D = Games drawn
- L = Games lost
- GF = Goals for
- GA = Goals against
- GD = Goal difference
- Pts = Points
- Pos. = League position

Key to cup record

- DNE = Did not enter
- DNQ = Did not qualify
- NH = Competition not held or canceled
- QR = Qualifying round
- PR = Preliminary round
- GS = Group stage
- R1 = First round
- R2 = Second round
- R3 = Third round
- R4 = Fourth round
- R5 = Fifth round
- Ro16 = Round of 16
- QF = Quarter-finals
- SF = Semi-finals
- F = Final
- RU = Runners-up
- W = Winners

== Seasons ==
Season	League											DFB- Pokal	Continental / Other	Average attendance	Top goalscorer(s)	
Season	Div	League	Pld	W	D	L	GF	GA	GD	Pts	Pos.	DFB- Pokal	Continental / Other	Average attendance	Player(s)	Goals
2004–05	4	OLB	34	20	5	9	55	38	+17	65	2nd	DNQ	DNQ	562	(Germany) Torsten Holm	11
2005–06	4	OLB	34	23	6	5	78	39	+39	75	1st	R1	DNQ	814	(Germany) Tobias Schlauderer	13
2006–07	3	RLS	34	13	12	9	45	39	+6	51	5th	DNQ	DNQ	1,419	(Hungary) András Tölcséres	9
2007–08	3	RLS	34	18	8	8	50	36	+14	62	2nd	DNQ	DNQ	3,132	(Germany) Steffen Wohlfarth	11
2008–09	2	2. BL	34	7	10	17	38	54	–16	31	17th	R1	DNQ	5,530	(Turkey) Ersin Demir	9
2009–10	3	3. L	38	18	10	10	72	46	+26	64	3rd	R1	DNQ	3,520	(Germany) Moritz Hartmann	21
2010–11	2	2. BL	34	9	10	15	40	46	–6	37	14th	R2	DNQ	8,078	(Germany) Stefan Leitl	13
2011–12	2	2. BL	34	8	13	13	43	58	–15	37	12th	R2	DNQ	7,563	(United States) Edson Buddle (Germany) Stefan Leitl	6
2012–13	2	2. BL	34	10	12	12	36	43	–7	42	13th	R1	DNQ	7,331	(Brazil) Caiuby	10
2013–14	2	2. BL	34	11	11	12	34	33	+1	44	10th	R3	DNQ	6,785	(Germany) Philipp Hoffmann	8
2014–15	2	2. BL	34	17	13	4	53	32	+21	64	1st	R1	DNQ	9,932	(Austria) Lukas Hinterseer (Germany) Stefan Lex	9
2015–16	1	1. BL	34	10	10	14	33	42	–9	40	11th	R1	DNQ	14,836	(Germany) Moritz Hartmann	12
2016–17	1	1. BL	34	8	8	18	36	57	–21	32	17th	R2	DNQ	14,601	(Israel) Almog Cohen	7
2017–18	2	2. BL	34	12	9	13	47	45	+2	45	9th	R3	DNQ	10,237	(Germany) Sonny Kittel	10
2018–19	2	2. BL	34	9	8	17	43	55	–12	35	16th	R1	DNQ	9,003	(Germany) Sonny Kittel	11
2019–20	3	3. L	38	17	12	9	61	40	+21	63	4th	R1	DNQ	4,960	(Germany) Dennis Eckert	14
2020–21	3	3. L	38	20	11	7	56	40	+16	71	3rd	R1	DNQ	7,346	(Germany) Stefan Kutschke	13
2021–22	2	2. BL	34	4	9	21	30	65	–35	21	18th	R2	DNQ	4,605	(Germany) Filip Bilbija	7
2022–23	3	3. L	38	14	5	19	54	56	–2	47	11th	R1	DNQ	4,921	(Denmark) Tobias Bech	13
2023–24	3	3. L	38	14	12	12	65	51	+14	54	10th	DNQ	DNQ	5,638	(Germany) Jannik Mause	18
2024–25	3	3. L	38	14	12	12	72	63	+9	54	10th	R1	DNQ	5,726	(Denmark) Sebastian Grønning	17
2025–26	3	3. L	38	13	10	15	65	56	+9	49	12th	DNQ	DNQ	5,063	(Germany) Marcel Costly	18
Total	–	–	776	289	216	271	1108	1034	+74	1081	–	–	—	–	–	–
