= Albana Vokshi =

Albanian politician (born 1971)

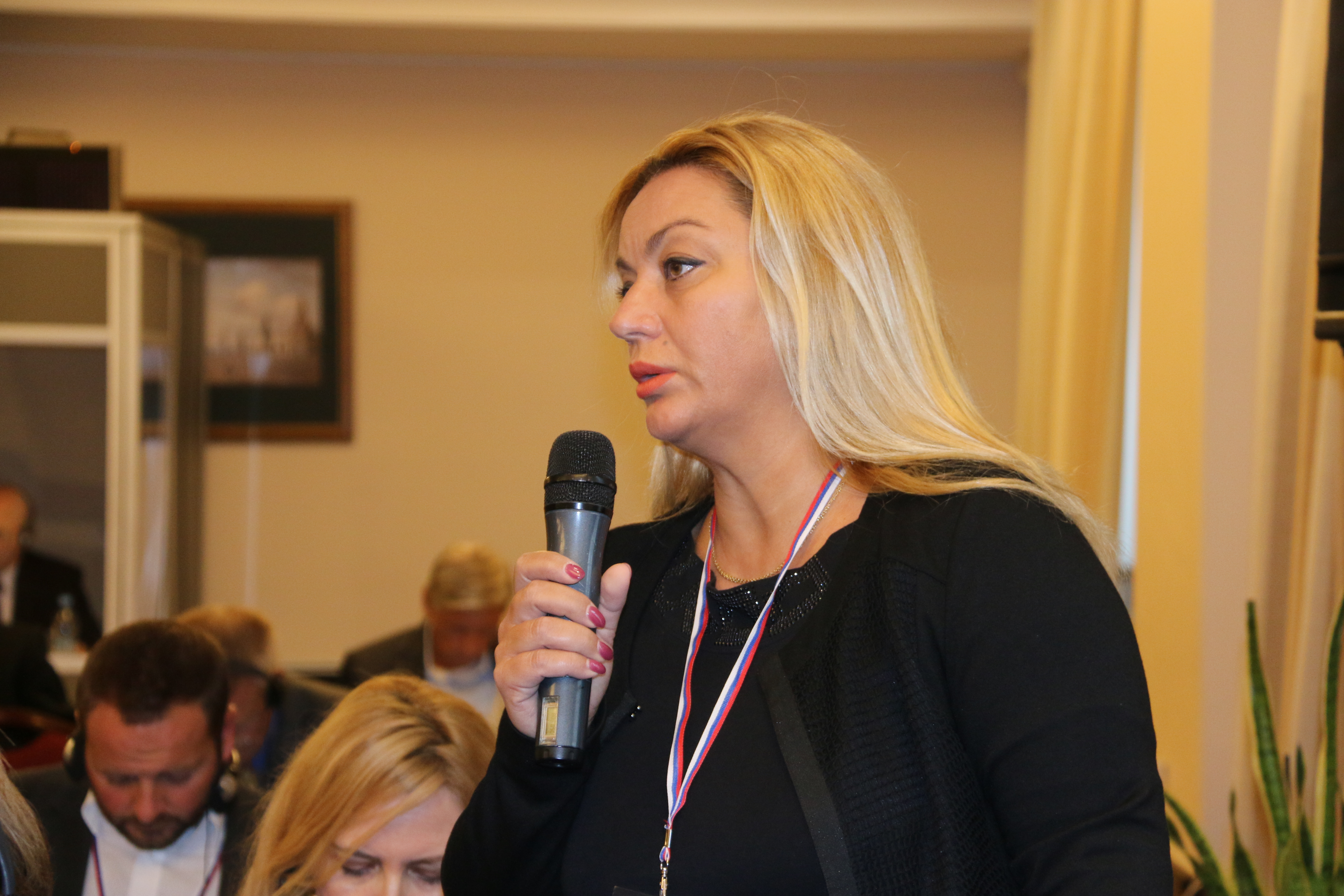
- Vokshi in 2016

Member of the Albanian parliament
- Incumbent
- Assumed office September 2009

Personal details
- Born: 24 February 1971 (age 55)
- Party: Democratic Party
- Education: University of Tirana

Albana Vokshi is a member of the Assembly of the Republic of Albania for the Democratic Party of Albania.

She was born on 24 February 1971 and graduated from the University of Tirana in Engineering. She later completed her master's degree at Columbia University.

She is a prominent figure of the Democratic Party, being an MP since 2009 for the Durrës County. Prior to that she served as Adviser for the Prime Minister Berisha. During the 2017 elections she was elected for the Tirana County. She has served as head of the Committee for Work, Social Issues and Health in the Parliament from 2013 until 2017. During her activity as an MP she focused on providing health services free or with a low payment, women employment and education and training facilities for women.

Vokshi is also the chairwoman of the Democratic League of Albanian Women, the women's wing of the Democratic Party.

She descends from the Vokshi tribe from Voksh, Kosovo, which have their origins from the Thaçi tribe according to Robert Elsie.
