= Hasta la vista =

Hasta la vista may refer to:

== Music ==
- "Hasta la Vista" (MC Solaar song), 2001
- "Hasta la vista" (Oleksandr Ponomariov song), Ukrainian entry in the Eurovision Song Contest 2003
- "Hasta la vista" (Ruslan Alekhno song), Belarusian entry in the Eurovision Song Contest 2008
- "Hasta la vista" (Hurricane song), Serbian entry in the Eurovision Song Contest 2020
- "Hasta la Vista", a song from the Camp Rock soundtrack
- "Hasta La Vista", a song by Lil Wayne from Tha Carter V, 2018

== Others ==
- Come as You Are (2011 film), also known as Hasta la Vista, a film by Geoffrey Enthoven
- Hasta La Vista (novel), a 1958 Albanian novel by Petro Marko

== See also ==
- Hasta la vista, baby (disambiguation)
- Hasee Toh Phasee, working title Hasta la vista Su Badam Pista, a 2014 Indian romantic comedy film by Vinil Mathew
