= Përpjekja shqiptare =

Albanian Magazine

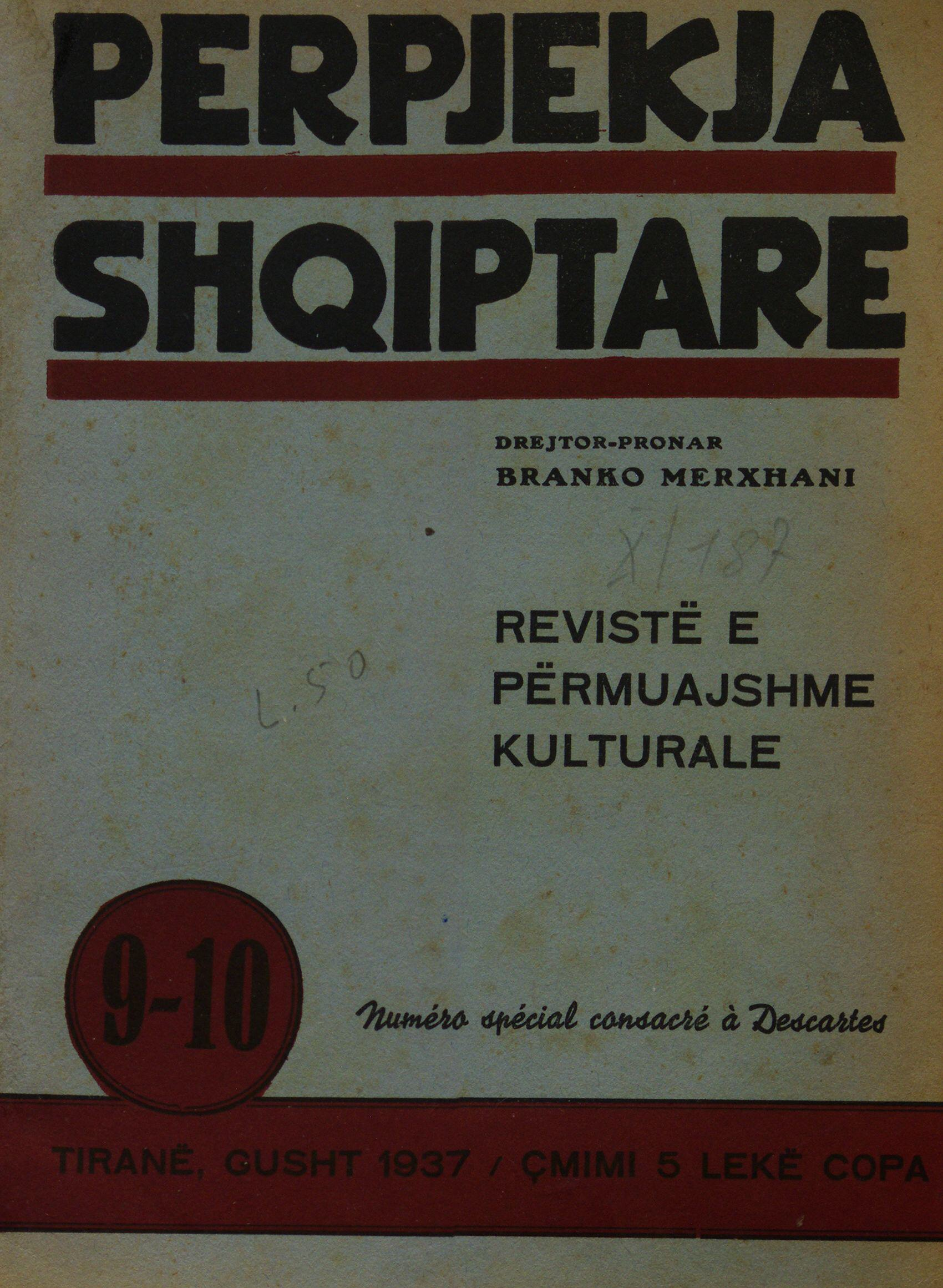
- Përpjekja shqiptare - issue of February - March 1938
- Editor: Petro Marko (administrator)
- Frequency: Monthly
- Publisher: Branko Merxhani
- Country: Albania
- Language: Albanian

Përpjekja shqiptare (English: The Albanian Endeavour), published by Branko Merxhani, and administered by Petro Marko was a literary magazine, published in Tirana, Albania from 1936 to 1939.

The magazine was published monthly is said to have had a great influence on the modernization of the cultural life of Albania at that time. The magazine offered to the contemporary readers modern Albanian literature in prose and poetry, as well as translations from modern foreign authors. In addition it included essays on philosophy, psychoanalysis, sociology, linguistics, archeology, and history. It propagated a spiritual and cultural rebirth, called Neo-Albanianism (Albanian: Neo-shqiptarisma), with a view on Western Europe.

Although it published only 27 times, the magazine had a notable influence on the Albanian culture. 1 issue was translated into French language.

== See also ==
- List of magazines in Albania
