= Branko Merxhani =

Albanian intellectual (b. 1894, d. 1981)

- Born: 1894; Niš, Ottoman Empire
- Died: 25 December 1981 (aged 86–87); Istanbul, Turkey
- Occupations: journalist, translator, publisher
- Writing career
- Pen name: Baha Özler, Ali Pazar

Aleksandër Merxhani (1894–1981), mostly known as Branko Merxhani, was an Albanian intellectual, sociologist, writer, journalist and literary critic. He was one of the most important cultural figures of the pre-World War II in Albania, publisher of Përpjekja shqiptare. During the '30s he developed an ideological program named Neo-Albanianism (Albanian: Neo-shqiptarisma), which he developed being heavily influenced by Turkish sociologist Ziya Gökalp.

== Life ==
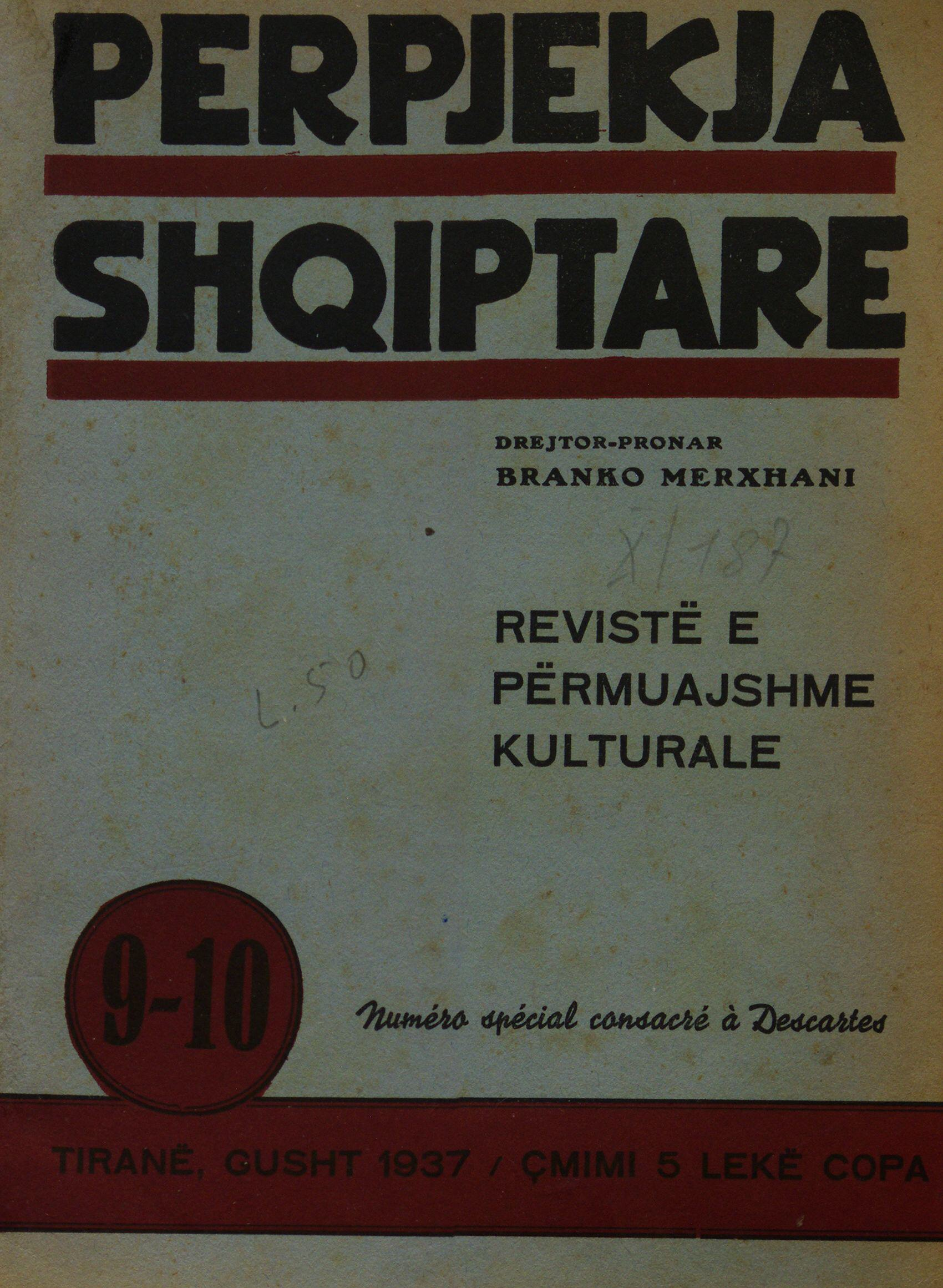
"Përpjekja shqiptare" literary magazine, which was published by Branko Merxhani

Originating from Sopik of Pogon kaza, his father was a judge in Nish, where he married with a local and Branko was born there. It is thought that his mother or his governess was German. After the Ottoman authorities relocated his father, he followed the German lyceum in Bursa, studied philosophy in the Ottoman Empire and followed his studies in Austria. After the triumph of Atatürk, he returned and worked as a journalist in Ankara's press. Afterwards he returned in Albania for property issues in his village of origin.

He settled in Gjirokastër, where he worked with the Demokratia magazine published by Jorgji Meksi, and along with Vangjel Koça, it was through its pages that he first presented his ideological program, known as Neo-shqiptarisma. At 1930 he went to Tirana where he started publishing a magazine named after his ideological program, Neo-shqiptarisma, but it lasted for only one issue. He started writing articles for Illyria magazine run by Karl Gurakuqi; their collaboration went on from March 1934 until 1936. From December 1935 he collaborated with the New Time (Albanian: Koha e Re) along with Suat Asllani, Petro Marko, Koça and Tajar Zavalani; but after 13 issues the journal stopped being published. In October 1936 he started to publish The Albanian Endeavour (Albanian: Përpjekja shqiptare).
