= 2015–16 FC Ingolstadt 04 season =

FC Ingolstadt 04
2015–16 season
- Chairman: Peter Jackwerth
- Head coach: Ralph Hasenhüttl
- Stadium: Audi Sportpark
- Bundesliga: 11th
- DFB-Pokal: First round
- Top goalscorer: League: Moritz Hartmann (12 goals); All: Moritz Hartmann (12 goals)
- Highest home attendance: 15,617 vs. Bayern Munich, 7 May 2016
- Lowest home attendance: 13,500 vs. Mainz 05, 23 January 2016
- Average home league attendance: 14,815
Home colours	Away colours	Third colours

The 2015–16 FC Ingolstadt 04 season was the 12th season in the club's history and their first in the Bundesliga.

== Events ==
Media Markt became the shirt sponsor on 3 May 2015, signing a three-year deal.

== Transfers ==
=== In ===
No.	Pos.	Name	Age	EU	Moving from	Type	Transfer Window	Contract ends	Transfer fee	Ref.
18	DF	(France) Romain Brégerie	28	Yes	Darmstadt 98	Transfer	Summer	2018	Free	
25	FW	(Germany) Elias Kachunga	23	Yes	SC Paderborn	Transfer	Summer	2019	Undisclosed	
26	GK	(Norway) Ørjan Håskjold Nyland	24	Yes	Molde	Transfer	Summer	2019	€1,000,000	
29	DF	(Austria) Markus Suttner	28	Yes	Austria Wien	Transfer	Summer	2018	Undisclosed	
31	MF	(Germany) Maurice Multhaup	18	Yes	Schalke 04	Transfer	Summer	2018	Undisclosed	
37	FW	(Paraguay) Darío Lezcano	25	No	Luzern	Transfer	Winter	2020	Undisclosed	

=== Out ===
No.	Pos.	Name	Age	EU	Moving to	Type	Transfer Window	Transfer fee	Ref.
	GK	(Germany) André Weis	25	Yes	FSV Frankfurt	Transfer	Summer	Undisclosed	
	DF	(Croatia) Andre Mijatović	35	Yes	Retirement	Released	Summer	—	
	DF	(Germany) Ralph Gunesch	31	Yes		Released	Summer	Free	
	FW	(Germany) Karl-Heinz Lappe	27	Yes	Bayern Munich II	Released	Summer	Free	
	MF	(Germany) Thomas Pledl	21	Yes	SV Sandhausen	Loan	Winter		
	FW	(Czech Republic) Tomáš Pekhart	26	Yes	AEK Athens	Transfer	Winter	Undisclosed	
	MF	(Germany) Stefan Wannenwetsch	24	Yes	Hansa Rostock	Transfer	Winter	Undisclosed	

== Friendlies ==
Win Draw Loss Postponed

Date	Kickoff^{1}	Venue	City	Opponent	Res.^{2}	Att.	Goalscorers		Ref.
Date	Kickoff^{1}	Venue	City	Opponent	Res.^{2}	Att.	FC Ingolstadt	Opponent	Ref.
4 July 2015	18:00	A	Burghausen	Wacker Burghausen	3–1	700	Brégerie 38'; Kachunga 39'; Pekhart 77'	Kadrijaj 89'	
8 July 2015	18:00	A	Großmehring	VfR Aalen	3–1	1,250	Groß 44'; Hinterseer 47'; Pekhart 57'	Drexler 70'	
12 July 2015	18:00	A	Grödig	SV Grödig	0–1	700		Wallner 74'	
15 July 2015	18:00	A	Mittersill	Zbrojovka Brno	2–0		Brégerie 8'; Cohen 68'		
18 July 2015	18:00		Lienz	Udinese	1–0	500	Groß 44'		
25 July 2015	15:30	H	Ingolstadt	Celta Vigo	1–0	2,500	Groß 16'		
29 July 2015	18:00	A	Leipzig	RB Leipzig	0–2	7,119		Demme 62'; Forsberg 78'	
1 August 2015				Al-Wahda	1–1	400	Hinterseer 47'	Tagliabué 61'	
4 September 2015	16:00	H	Ingolstadt	Greuther Fürth	3–1	1,006	Flekker 50' (o.g.); Kachunga 80'; Röcker 87' (o.g.)	Kumbela 44'	
7 January 2016		A	Aalen	VfR Aalen	1–1	250	Cohen 80'	Wegkamp 56'	
10 January 2016	16:00	H	Ingolstadt	Sonnenhof Großaspach	6–1	300	Multhaup 11'; Groß 18'; Kachunga 21', 33'; Hartmann 72' (pen.); Hinterseer 85'	Breier 50'	
13 January 2016	14:30	H	Ingolstadt	Karlsruher SC	1–0	200	Hartmann 17' (pen.)		
16 January 2016	15:30	A	Kaiserslautern	1. FC Kaiserslautern	0–0	1,021			

== Bundesliga ==
=== League table ===
Pos	Team	Pld	W	D	L	GF	GA	GD	Pts
9	1. FC Köln	34	10	13	11	38	42	−4	43
10	Hamburger SV	34	11	8	15	40	46	−6	41
11	FC Ingolstadt	34	10	10	14	33	42	−9	40
12	FC Augsburg	34	9	11	14	42	52	−10	38
13	Werder Bremen	34	10	8	16	50	65	−15	38

Source: DFB
Rules for classification: 1) Points; 2) Goal difference; 3) Goals scored; 4) Head-to-head points; 5) Head-to-head goal difference; 6) Head-to-head away goals scored; 7) Away goals scored; 8) Play-offs.

=== Results summary ===
Overall								Home						Away					
Pld	W	D	L	GF	GA	GD	Pts	W	D	L	GF	GA	GD	W	D	L	GF	GA	GD
34	10	10	14	33	42	−9	40	7	5	5	22	18	+4	3	5	9	11	24	−13

Last updated: 14 May 2016.
Source: Bundesliga

=== Bundesliga fixtures & results ===
Win Draw Loss

MD	Date Kickoff^{1}	H/A	Opponent	Res. F–A	Att.	Goalscorers		Table		Ref.
MD	Date Kickoff^{1}	H/A	Opponent	Res. F–A	Att.	FC Ingostadt	Opponent	Pos.	Pts.	Ref.
1	15 August 2015; 15:30	A	Mainz 05	1–0	28,000	Hinterseer 66'		7th	3	
2	23 August 2015; 15:30	H	Borussia Dortmund	0–4	15,000		Ginter 55'; Reus 60'; Kagawa 84'; Aubameyang 90+1'	9th	3	
3	29 August 2015; 15:30	A	FC Augsburg	1–0	30,003	Leckie 63'		7th	6	
4	12 September 2015; 15:30	H	VfL Wolfsburg	0–0	14,095			9th	7	
5	19 September 2015; 15:30	A	Werder Bremen	1–0	40,500	Hartmann 90+3' (pen.)		6th	10	
6	22 September 2015; 20:00	H	Hamburger SV	0–1	15,000		Gregoritsch 87'	8th	10	
7	25 September 2015; 20:30	A	1. FC Köln	1–1	47,800	Matip 21'	Modeste 10'	8th	11	
8	3 October 2015; 15:30	H	Eintracht Frankfurt	2–0	15,000	Groß 78'; Lex 84'		6th	14	
9	18 October 2015; 17:30	A	VfB Stuttgart	0–1	45,700		Didavi 59'	8th	14	
10	24 October 2015; 18:30	H	Hertha BSC	0–1	15,000		Weiser 11'	8th	14	
11	31 October 2015; 15:30	A	Schalke 04	1–1	60,144	Levels 39'	Sané 77'	8th	15	
12	7 November 2015; 15:30	A	Borussia Mönchengladbach	0–0	52,331			10th	16	
13	22 November 2015; 17:30	H	Darmstadt 98	3–1	14,551	Bauer 58'; Hartmann 60' (pen.) 88'	Sulu 9'	8th	19	
14	28 November 2015; 15:30	A	Hannover 96	0–4	35,000		Marcelo 5'; Andreasen 11'; Karaman 24'; Bech 85'	11th	19	
15	5 December 2015; 15:30	H	1899 Hoffenheim	1–1	14,255	Roger 66'	Uth 90+6'	11th	20	
16	12 December 2015; 15:30	A	Bayern Munich	0–2	75,000		Lewandowski 65'; Lahm 75'	11th	20	
17	19 December 2015; 15:30	H	Bayer Leverkusen	0–1	15,000		Hernández 73'	11th	20	
18	23 January 2016; 15:30	H	Mainz 05	1–0	13,500	Hartmann 41' (pen.)		10th	23	
19	30 January 2016; 15:30	A	Borussia Dortmund	0–2	81,359		Aubameyang 77', 86'	10th	23	
20	6 February 2016; 15:30	H	FC Augsburg	2–1	15,000	Matip 59'; Hartmann 85' (pen.)	Stafylidis 14'	10th	26	
21	13 February 2016; 15:30	A	VfL Wolfsburg	0–2	26,884		Draxler 29'; Knoche 39'	12th	26	
22	20 February 2016; 15:30	H	Werder Bremen	2–0	15,000	Hübner 12'; Hinterseer 90' (pen.)		10th	29	
23	27 February 2016; 15:30	A	Hamburger SV	1–1	50,675	Hinterseer 61'	Drmić 7'	9th	30	
24	1 March 2016; 20:00	H	1. FC Köln	1–1	14,503	Hinterseer 36'	Modeste 72'	9th	31	
25	5 March 2016; 15:30	A	Eintracht Frankfurt	1–1	40,000	Hartmann 8' (pen.)	Russ 69'	9th	32	
26	12 March 2016; 15:30	H	VfB Stuttgart	3–3	15,107	Hartmann 4'; Leckie 56'; Lezcano 61'	Kostić 9'; Rupp 79'; Didavi 84' (pen.)	10th	33	
27	19 March 2016; 15:30	A	Hertha BSC	1–2	40,385	Hinterseer 75'	Haraguchi 54'; Kalou 69'	10th	33	
28	2 April 2016; 15:30	H	Schalke 04	3–0	15,200	Hartmann 29' (pen.); Hinterseer 45+2'; Lezcano 65'		9th	36	
29	9 April 2016; 15:30	H	Borussia Mönchengladbach	1–0	15,200	Hartmann 88'		9th	39	
30	16 April 2016; 15:30	A	Darmstadt 98	0–2	15,600		Rausch 51'; Wagner 85'	9th	39	
31	23 April 2016; 15:30	H	Hannover 96	2–2	14,831	Morales 10'; Hartmann 25'	Sakai 58'; Kiyotake 82'	9th	40	
32	30 April 2016; 15:30	A	1899 Hoffenheim	1–2	26,561	Lex 17'	Uth 37'; Amiri 84'	9th	40	
33	7 May 2016; 15:30	H	Bayern Munich	1–2	15,617	Hartmann 42'	Lewandowski 15' (pen.), 32'	10th	40	
34	14 May 2016; 15:30	A	Bayer Leverkusen	2–3	29,220	Leckie 16'; Hartmann 69' (pen.)	Aránguiz 31'; Kießling 37', 61'	11th	40	

== DFB–Pokal ==
Win Draw Loss Postponed

RD	Date	Kickoff^{1}	Venue	City	Opponent	Result^{2}	Attendance	Goalscorers		Ref.
RD	Date	Kickoff^{1}	Venue	City	Opponent	Result^{2}	Attendance	FC Ingolstadt	Opponent	Ref.
1	9 August 2015	16:00	A	Unterhaching	SpVgg Unterhaching	1–2	6,500	Hartmann 83'	Einsiedler 30', 48'	

== Player information ==
As of 15 May 2016

No.	Pos	Nat	Player	Total		Bundesliga		DFB-Pokal	
No.	Pos	Nat	Player	Apps	Goals	Apps	Goals	Apps	Goals
1	GK	(Austria) AUT	Ramazan Özcan	28	0	28	0	0	0
5	DF	(Germany) GER	Benjamin Hübner	31	1	30	1	1	0
6	MF	(United States) USA	Alfredo Morales	25	1	24	1	1	0
7	FW	(Australia) AUS	Mathew Leckie	32	3	32	3	0	0
8	MF	(Brazil) BRA	Roger	30	1	29	1	1	0
9	FW	(Germany) GER	Moritz Hartmann	31	12	30	12	1	0
10	MF	(Germany) GER	Pascal Groß	33	1	32	1	1	0
13	DF	(Germany) GER	Michael Zant	0	0	0	0	0	0
14	MF	(Germany) GER	Stefan Lex	22	2	21	2	1	0
15	DF	(Brazil) BRA	Danilo Soares	1	0	1	0	0	0
16	FW	(Austria) AUT	Lukas Hinterseer	29	7	28	6	1	1
18	DF	(France) FRA	Romain Brégerie	23	0	22	0	1	0
19	MF	(Germany) GER	Max Christiansen	20	0	19	0	1	0
20	DF	(Kazakhstan) KAZ	Konstantin Engel	4	0	4	0	0	0
21	DF	(Germany) GER	Danny da Costa	21	0	20	0	1	0
23	MF	(Germany) GER	Robert Bauer	24	1	24	1	0	0
25	FW	(Germany) GER	Elias Kachunga	10	0	10	0	0	0
26	GK	(Norway) NOR	Ørjan Nyland	7	0	6	0	1	0
28	DF	(Germany) GER	Tobias Levels	16	1	16	1	0	0
29	DF	(Austria) AUT	Markus Suttner	19	0	18	0	1	0
31	MF	(Germany) GER	Maurice Multhaup	4	0	4	0	0	0
34	DF	(Cameroon) CMR	Marvin Matip	34	2	33	2	1	0
36	MF	(Israel) ISR	Almog Cohen	20	0	20	0	0	0
37	FW	(Paraguay) PAR	Darío Lezcano	17	2	17	2	0	0
39	GK	(Germany) GER	Christian Ortag	0	0	0	0	0	0
Players who left the club during the 2015–16 season
11	FW	(Czech Republic) CZE	Tomáš Pekhart	5	0	4	0	1	0
22	DF	(Germany) GER	Stefan Wannenwetsch	1	0	1	0	0	0
30	MF	(Germany) GER	Thomas Pledl (on loan to SV Sandhausen)	0	0	0	0	0	0

== Notes ==
- 1.Kickoff time in Central European Time/Central European Summer Time.
- 2.FC Ingolstadt 04's goals first.
