= Abdullah Pasha =

Abdullah Pasha may refer to:

- Köprülü Abdullah Pasha (1684–1735), Ottoman general and military commander
- Seyyid Abdullah Pasha (died 1761), Ottoman grand vizier (1747–50) and governor of Egypt (1751–52)
- Naili Abdullah Pasha (died 1758), Ottoman grand vizier (1755)
- Abdullah Pasha al-Azm (fl. 1783–1810), Ottoman governor of Damascus, Aleppo, Adana, and Rakka
- Abdullah Pasha ibn Ali (born 1801), Ottoman governor of Acre and Sidon (1820–1832)
- Kölemen Abdullah Pasha (1846–1937), Ottoman general in the First Balkan War
- Abdullah Pashë Dreni (1820–1878), military and tribal leader in the Kosovo Vilayet

== See also ==
- Abdullah (name)
- Pasha (title)
