= Hasta La Vista (novel) =

1958 novel by Petro Marko

- Author: Petro Marko
- Language: Albanian
- Publisher: OMSCA-1
- Publication place: Albania
- Pages: 452
- ISBN: 978-99927-40-77-4

Hasta La Vista is an Albanian novel written by Petro Marko in 1958. It widely encompasses the author's experience in the Spanish Civil War in which he was part of the International Brigades, Garibaldi Battalion.

== Plot ==
The novel tells two interwoven, non-separated stories. The first revolves mainly around the Albanian members of the International Brigades, the horrors of war that they experience and also their personalities and personal philosophies. Among the characters are some notable Albanian figures like Skënder Luarasi, Asim Vokshi, Mehmet Shehu, Xhemal Kada and Petro Marko himself. During the events of the war some of the participants unable to cope with the horrors desert their battalions. In the novel the flaws of the characters such as their deserter tendencies are not hidden, for which the author was praised for.

The second story is the love between Gori, a handsome Albanian soldier in his twenties with curly hair, and Anita, a beautiful Spanish nurse who tends to the wounded soldiers. They meet and fall in love in a hellish improvised hospital, which the author describes as always being in turmoil and very noisy, after Gori is wounded in battle and Anita tends to his wounds.

== Setting ==
The events in the novel take place in Spain during the Spanish Civil War depicting graphic experiences the author remembers.

== See also ==
- Albanian literature
- Petro Marko
- Spanish Civil War
