= Private sector development =

Term in the international development industry

Private sector development (PSD) is a term in the international development industry to refer to a range of strategies for promoting economic growth and reducing poverty in developing countries by building private enterprises. This could be through working with firms directly, with membership organisations to represent them, or through a range of areas of policy and regulation to promote functioning, competitive markets.

== Overview ==
Supporters argue that PSD is an important part of poverty reduction. Whether as workers, subsistence farmers or entrepreneurs, most poor people already participate in markets. Strengthening these markets in ways that secure higher incomes for the poor is therefore seen by PSD advocates as a fair and efficient way to fight poverty. Earning a decent income in the private sector, it is argued, is also more dignifying than relying on hand-outs.

An April 2013 EPS PEAKS paper found a strong and well-established case for donors to intervene in private markets to deliver subsidies for development purposes. The researcher found that the theoretical reasons for intervention were well established by the economics literature, but that the practical approaches and frameworks for delivering subsidies to private sector entities are more complex and less understood. The approaches that do exist vary widely. The researcher identified some key criteria that can be used to evaluate different approaches and instruments and gave examples of their usage by different donor institutions. In practical terms, they said that thoroughly-researched cost benefit analyses should be used to assess project impact and that it was vital that donors recognise that actively distorting a market outcome might have significant consequences, and that these need to be understood and analysed.

== Approaches to private sector development ==
=== Business environment reform ===
Where entrepreneurship and markets are stifled by inappropriate regulation, excessive taxation, lack of fair competition, lack of voice or an unstable policy environment, growth and poverty reduction are likely to suffer. Typically, donors first fund business environment analyses, such as the World Bank's Doing Business Reports, identifying the major constraints to business growth. They then work with government and other stakeholders to implement reforms.

The private sector itself can play an important role in advocating for a better business environment. Many development agencies thus work to strengthen the capacity of businesses and business associations to engage in public-private dialogue with governments.

=== Business linkages and value chain development ===
A value chain is a series of activities that enterprises undertake when they produce a good or service, adding value to the inputs at each stage. Value Chain Development thus seeks to maximise the value of any given type of product, whilst incurring the least possible cost to the producers, in the places along the production chain that give the most benefit to poor people. One way is to improve production processes. Another way is to increase the commercial linkages between the businesses that poor people own or work for, and businesses that can offer them new and more profitable opportunities as customers or suppliers.

=== Business development services ===
This approach seeks to build markets in services that improve the performance of individual enterprises. Some of the most important BDS markets are in training, consultancy, marketing, market information, information technology and technology transfer. For many within the development community, donors should ideally not undertake BDS directly; instead they should facilitate commercial BDS providers to be self-sustaining, through the improvement of their techniques and the sourcing of new clients. BDS markets can be sustainable where providers recover their costs via the fees they charge for services.

However, business development services are also found in developed countries where the argument advanced is that the market for business development fails and therefore the government should enable this market. Developed countries experience suggests that fees for publicly supported advice was a policy that did not work. In fact, the evidence suggests that subsidised intensive work with relatively few business clients works well, which suggests the requirement for DBS to be self-financing is too onerous.

=== Market Systems Development ===
The Market Systems Development (MSD) approach, also known as M4P, aims to understand how poor people interact with market systems, and how these systems can be changed to improve their lives. It aims for large-scale, sustainable impact by focusing on overall markets, rather than targeting individual actors within that market. In this sense, an MSD programme may incorporate various elements of value chain development, BDS and/or business environment reform. Donors that have pioneered the MSD approach include the UK's Department for International Development (DFID), the Australian Government's Department of Foreign Affairs and Trade (DFAT), the Swedish International Development Cooperation Agency (Sida) and the Swiss Agency for Development and Cooperation (SDC). The BEAM Exchange is a leading source of information about the MSD approach.

=== Green growth ===
A number of development agencies are engaged in developing markets to channel finance raised for climate change mitigation and adaptation in industrialised countries towards initiatives that reduce carbon emissions in the developing world. Low Emission Development Strategies (LEDS) are used to bridge the public and private sectors with the goal of enabling growth in a given industry or region. If managed appropriately, they argue, the challenge of responding to climate change could generate decent jobs and incomes for many millions of poor people.

=== Women's Economic Empowerment ===
In many parts of the developing world, women are systematically excluded from business opportunities. Discrimination can disadvantage women in their access to the knowledge and skills needed to be successful in business. At the same time, laws that disadvantage women in gaining access to property can make it hard for women to raise the necessary capital.

=== Local economic development ===
Local Economic Development (LED) typically starts by analysing the economy of a particular region or municipality, identifying opportunities to enhance its prospects. LED strategies may combine any of the following: business environment reform, value chain development, infrastructure development, innovation and technology policy, planning and/ or skills development. LED programmes often involve local and regional governments, the private sector and civil society in programme design and implementation. LEDknowledge.org is an open access database of publications on Local Economic Development. In addition, the Donor Committee for Enterprise Development has a knowledge page on Local Economic Development and Clusters.

=== Public-private partnerships ===
Many development agencies are now working directly with businesses to deliver development impacts. Such public-private partnerships or public-private development partnerships cover a wide range of activities. A common characteristic of most PPPs is the aim to leverage the development impact of companies’ core business activities. One increasingly common approach is to create a Challenge Fund, whereby companies bid for donor funding, competing to maximise the development impact of the grant money made available. Other PPP programmes assist companies in finding business partners in developing countries, or offer technical support and expertise.

=== Access to finance ===
Affordable access to finance is seen by most experts as vital to private enterprises in the developing world. While some development agencies therefore see it as part of Private Sector Development, many treat it as a separate field in its own right.

=== Private sector development in conflict-affected environments ===
Conflict presents unique challenges and unique opportunities for Private Sector Development. One the one hand, conflict disrupts the regular functioning of markets and in their place creates a war economy. PSD practitioners must be sensitive to the impact of their activities on the conflict situation, e.g. effects on the distribution of resources, as well as the impacts that conflict will have on their activities. On the other hand, where it generates job creation and trade, Private Sector Development can play a role in peacebuilding and preparing for future development.

=== Industrial policy ===
Industrial policy is broadly defined as selective government intervention to promote a specific economic sector and promote structural change. It may target manufacturing, agricultural or services sectors.

=== Innovation policy ===
Innovation is an important driver of competitiveness, growth and employment generation. In the context of private sector development, “innovation is understood as the commercially successful introduction or implementation of a technical or organisational innovation.” Donor agency support to innovation covers a broad range of activities, including the creation of appropriate framework conditions for innovation, and the development of innovative capacities of companies. This may include business advisory and support services, finance and skills development; business incubators and technology extension services, as well as value chain and cluster approaches.

=== Digital transformation ===
Digital technologies are driving the fourth industrial revolution of the 21st century and the COVID-19 pandemic is likely to further accelerate the speed of change. Digital transformation of companies, industries and economies can boost productivity, innovation and access to global markets for producers in developing countries. On the other hand, without the necessary infrastructure (e.g. access to reliable electricity and networks), a suitably skilled workforce and an enabling regulatory environment many poor countries are likely to find themselves at the wrong end of the global digital divide.

=== Private sector development following the 2008 financial crisis ===
The 2008 financial crisis raised questions about the ways in which markets should be regulated to ensure long-term, sustainable development. At the same time, with many countries faced with slower growth and higher unemployment, reviving economies by stimulating the private sector was seen by many as a global response.

== See also ==
- Aid
- Asian Development Bank
- AusAID
- Canadian International Development Agency
- Corporate governance
- Corporate social responsibility
- Danish International Development Agency
- FCDO
- Deutsche Gesellschaft für Internationale Zusammenarbeit
- Dutch Ministry of Foreign Affairs
- Economic Development
- Entrepreneurial ecosystem
- European Bank for Reconstruction and Development
- Federal Ministry of Economic Cooperation and Development
- French Development Agency
- French Foreign Ministry
- Food and Agriculture Organization
- Foreign direct investment
- International Development Research Centre
- International Finance Corporation
- International Fund for Agricultural Development
- International Labour Office
- Norwegian Agency for Development Cooperation
- Organisation for Economic Co-operation and Development
- Poverty reduction
- Swedish International Development Cooperation Agency
- United Nations Development Programme
- United Nations Industrial Development Organization
- USAID
- World Bank
