= Hasta la vista, baby (disambiguation) =

"Hasta la vista, baby" is a catchphrase from the film Terminator 2: Judgment Day.

Hasta la vista, baby may also refer to:

- Hasta la Vista, Baby! (Skin album), 1998
- Hasta la Vista Baby! (U2 album), 2000

== See also ==
- Hasta la vista (disambiguation)
