= Ilio Barontini =

Italian politician (1890–1951)

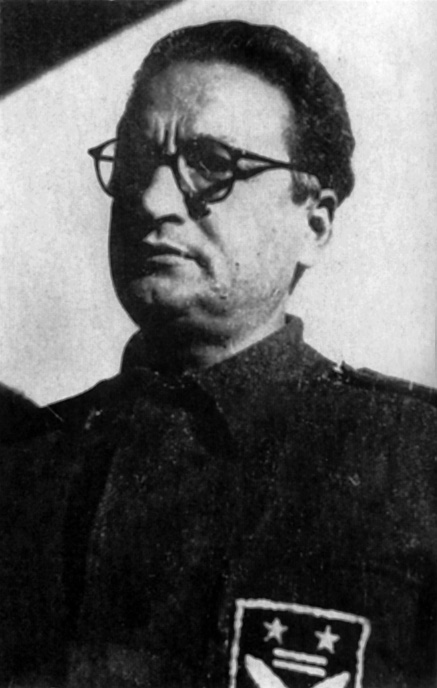

Member of the Italian Constituent Assembly
- In office 25 June 1946 – 31 January 1948
- Parliamentary group: Communist
- Constituency: Pisa

Member of the Italian Senate
- In office 8 May 1948 – 22 January 1951
- Parliamentary group: Communist
- Constituency: Tuscany

Personal details
- Born: 28 September 1890 Cecina, Kingdom of Italy
- Died: 22 January 1951 (aged 60) Scandicci, Italy
- Resting place: Cimitero comunale dei Lupi, Livorno
- Citizenship: Italian, Soviet
- Party: Italian Communist Party
- Other political affiliations: Italian Socialist Party (1905–1921)
- Nicknames: Fanti; Paulus; Giobbe; Dario

Military service
- Allegiance: Spanish Republic; National Liberation Committee
- Branch/service: International Brigades
- Unit: XII International Brigade; Garibaldi Battalion
- Battles/wars: Siege of Madrid; Battle of Guadalajara

Ilio Barontini (28 September 1890 – 22 January 1951) was an Italian Communist politician and guerrilla fighter. He notably fought in the Spanish Civil War and in the Italian resistance.

== Biography ==
Ilio Barontini was born on 28 September 1890 into a peasant family in Cecina, in the province of Livorno in Tuscany. He joined the Italian Socialist Party at a young age and was a metalworker, first at Breda in Milan and then for the Italian state railways in Livorno. In January 1921 he joined the newly-formed Communist Party of Italy and was the first secretary of the Livorno chapter of the party, as well as a local union leader.

After Benito Mussolini became Prime Minister of Italy Barontini lost his job due to his anti-fascist convictions and faced political persecution. In July 1928 he was on trial before the Special Tribunal for the Defense of the State for distribution of subversive propaganda, but was acquitted.

In 1931 he went in exile in France, and two years later moved to the Soviet Union, where he worked as a technician and attended classes at the International Lenin School, an institution which trained Communist cadres, and the Frunze Military Academy. During this period he travelled to China to receive guerrilla training with Mao Zedong's Red Army.

He volunteered in the International Brigades during the Spanish Civil War. He took part in the defense of Madrid and, in January 1937, replaced Antonio Roasio as political commissar of the Garibaldi Battalion, a unit consisting of Italian volunteers. Since battalion commander Randolfo Pacciardi was absent for medical reasons, in March 1937 Barontini was de facto in command of the unit during the battle of Guadalajara, where Republicans won. This was also the first time where Italians fought each other on opposite side during the civil war.

In December 1938 he traveled to Ethiopia through Egypt and Sudan on request of the Communist International. Based in the Gojjam region, Barontini and a handful of Italian Communists helped organize and train resistance groups to the Italian occupation under the command of degiac (Dejazmach) Mangascia Giamberie (or Mengesha Jembere). They also printed a bilingual clandestine newspaper, La Voce degli Etiopi. (Note: Sometimes cited as La Voce degli Abissini.) The group returned to France in the spring of 1940, after suffering injuries and losing radio contact with Europe.

After the German invasion he was interned in Le Vernet until the Soviet government, which was still cooperating with the Axis at the time, claimed him as his citizen and requested his release. Once released Barontini worked with the FTP-MOI in Marseille area, which he organized among Italian emigrants, and the GAP and the Garibaldi Brigades (of which he was regional commander in Emilia-Romagna) in Italy.

After World War II he became a member of the Central Committee of the now-renamed Italian Communist Party (PCI). He sat in the National Council, a provisional legislative body created in the months immediately following the end of the war. In 1946 he was elected to the Constituent Assembly, and in 1948 to the first Senate of the Italian Republic. As a Senator he was secretary of the body's Defense Committee.

He died on 22 January 1951 in a road accident in Scandicci near Florence, while returning from a party meeting.
