= Mirlinda Kusari-Purrini =

Mirlinda Kusari Purrini
- Born: December 9, 1967 (age 58); Gjakova, SFR Yugoslavia
- Education: University of Pristina; GLOBUS International; The Making Markets Work for the Poor Approach; Training of Trainers for Capacity Building of NGO; Center for the Firm, Entrepreneurship and Management; Capacity building NGO’s as a Trainer
- Occupation: Economist
- Years active: 1999-present
- Spouse: Shkelzen Purrini

Mirlinda Kusari Purrini (Albanian pronunciation: [miɾlinda kusaɾi purini]; born December 9, 1967) is the founder and executive director of SHE-ERA in Kosovo, a post she has held since September, 1999. She is an economist by occupation with a degree in Economics and Finance at the University of Pristina. Mrs. Kusari is active in both business and humanitarian circles with experience in international research and projects.

== Early life and education ==
Kusari was born in Gjakova in the Southwest of Kosovo, where she attended primary and secondary school. She graduated from the University of Prishtina Faculty of Economic & Finance in 1991. After that she worked as a manager of finance in the Spirit company and in the liquids factory ARTI, as an accountant in many enterprises and as a leader of C&A, in Gjakova. During her career she has attended numerous training courses in minority issues, economic development, etc. for women, men and youth. Kusari has extensive experience of working in transition economies across the Balkans as well as within Kosovo. She has received extensive professional training at The Making Markets Work for the Poor Approach M4P, the Training of Trainers for Capacity Building of NGO-Soros Foundation in Denmark, the Center for the Firm, Entrepreneurship and Management: Five steps to your business plan in Macedonia, the Capacity building NGO’s as a Trainer in Albania and the RIINVEST Summer School on Entrepreneurship also in Ohrid, Macedonia. In 2013 she completed the International General Management MBA in GLOBUS International, Kosovo.

== Founder & Executive Director of She-Era ==
The history of Women’s Business Association “SHE-ERA” is non-governmental organization for the economic development, established after the latest conflict in the Balkans, in September 1999, with the purpose of economic empowerment of women. SHE-ERA areas of work were different and corresponded to the post-conflict environmental needs. During this time SHE-ERA has developed its identity and it is known as one of the key and most influential actors that aim to strengthen the position of women and encourage the empowerment of women entrepreneurs. This organization is also involved in research and analysis of the position of women, and supports local governmental institutions to compile and apply the politics and legal frameworks that promote gender equality and the involvement of Kosovar women in political, social, economic and cultural areas.

The organization has created a distinguished reputation for its services. Through its services, SHE-ERA offers consultations, business planning, document collection for proposals, marketing strategies and market research, services on human resources and operating management for the businesses of women entrepreneurs in Kosovo. SHE-ERA operates by providing offer management services to international companies that aspire to operate in Kosovo. SHE-ERA performs or lessens the studying mission and assists on the development of methodologies and proposals. Until now, SHE-ERA has made numerous partnerships with different organizations in the area of business development in Central, Eastern and Western Europe, U.S., Canada and Asia. As a result, SHE-ERA is determined to help develop international relations for local businesses and internal investments. SHE-ERA presents new international product offer requests for mutual investors, and offers partnerships to businesses in search of them. Since its establishment up until today, SHE-ERA has completed 60 projects in the local and regional level, providing trainings in business, consulting, research, analysis and mentoring. Beneficiaries of these trainings so far include more than 5,000 women, where the total number reaches 10,000 men and women who have benefited in the region of Kosovo. SHE-ERA has published five analyses about Women Entrepreneurs in Kosovo, Gender Budget in the local and central level, Woman’s position during the privatization and a report on the First International Conference for women entrepreneurs in Kosovo.

== Awards ==
On October 27, 2011 she received The International Alliance for Women, Award from Washington, D.C./US Canadian Embassy Building.

== Personal life ==
Kusari is married to Shkelzen Purrini. They live in the capital city of Pristina
