= Stefan Wannenwetsch =

German retired footballer (born 1992)

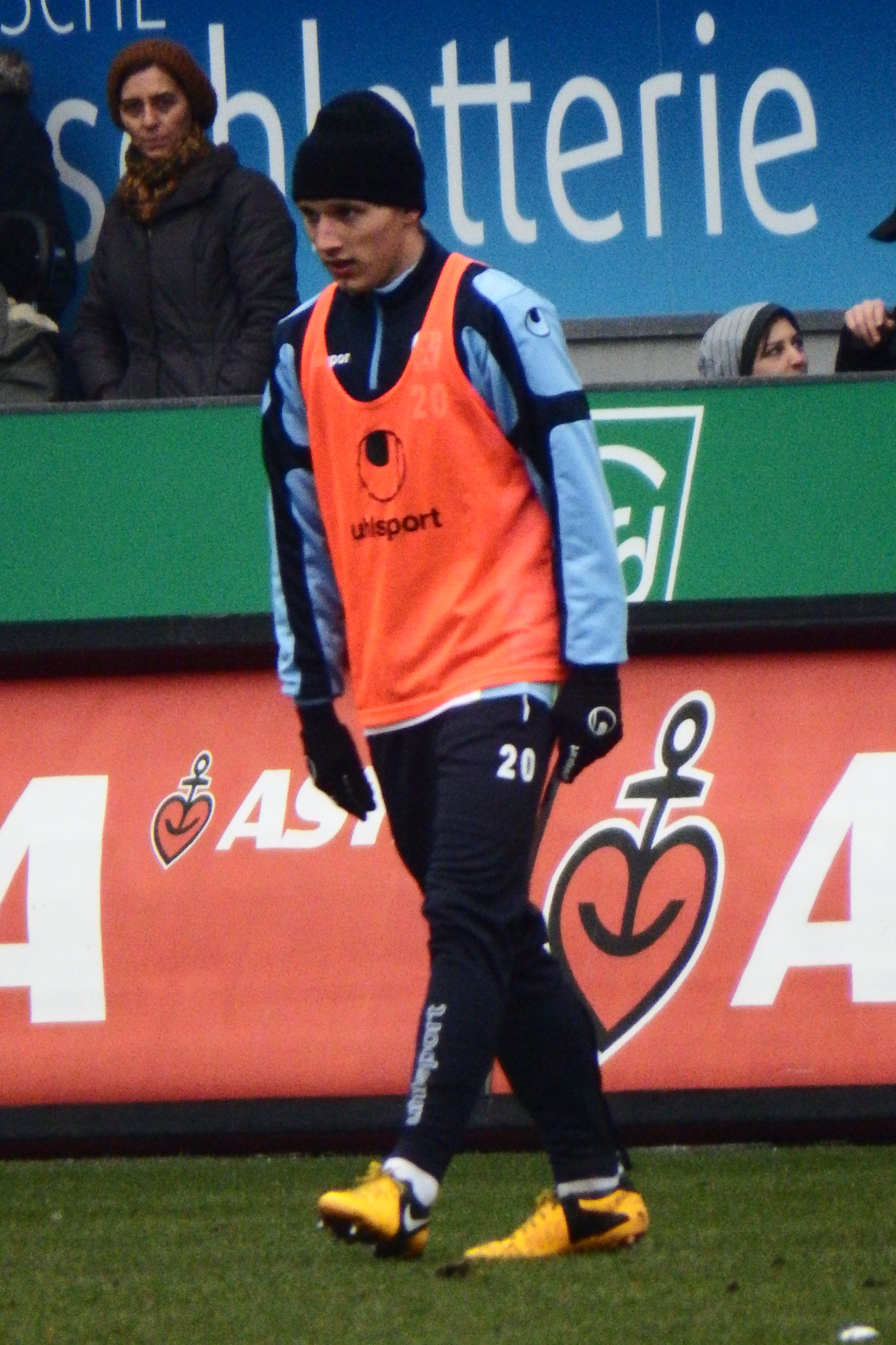
- Wannenwetsch with 1860 in 2013.

Personal information
- Date of birth: 19 January 1992 (age 34)
- Place of birth: Langenau, Germany
- Height: 1.78 m (5 ft 10 in)
- Position: Midfielder

Team information
- Current team: Niederstotzingen/Rammingen (Manager)

Youth career
- 1997–2002: SF Rammingen
- 2002–2009: SSV Ulm
- 2009–2011: 1860 Munich

Senior career*
Years	Team	Apps	(Gls)
2011–2014	1860 Munich II	57	(3)
2012–2014	1860 Munich	13	(0)
2014–2016	FC Ingolstadt 04	6	(0)
2015–2016	FC Ingolstadt 04 II	12	(0)
2016–2019	Hansa Rostock	102	(4)
2019–2020	VfR Aalen	7	(0)

Managerial career
- 2020–: Niederstotzingen/Rammingen
- * Club domestic league appearances and goals

Stefan Wannenwetsch (born 19 January 1992) is a German retired footballer who played as a midfielder.

== Career ==
=== Playing career ===
Wannenwetsch made his 2. Bundesliga debut for TSV 1860 Munich in November 2012, in a 2–2 draw with Union Berlin. He signed for FC Ingolstadt 04 in 2014.

On 1 February 2016, Wannenwetsch moved to Hansa Rostock. He made his debut for the club on 6 February 2016 in a 2–0 loss against Stuttgarter Kickers and received a red card on 27 February 2016 in a 1–0 win against Energie Cottbus.

In June 2019 it was announced Wannenwetsch would leave the club after having chosen not to accept Hansa Rostock's offer of a contract extension.

=== Coaching career ===
Due to injuries, Wannenwetsch was forced to end his career at the age of 28. In the same summer as his retirement, he was appointed manager of his childhood club, Sportfreunde Rammingen. As of the 2022-23 season, the club changed name to SGM Niederstotzingen/Rammingen.

== Career statistics ==
Stefan Wannenwetsch is a Midfielder who has appeared in 7 matches this season in Regionalliga, playing a total of 614 minutes. Click here to read more articles

As of match played on 1 June 2019.

Club	Season	League			Cup		Other		Total	
Club	Season	Division	Apps	Goals	Apps	Goals	Apps	Goals	Apps	Goals
1860 Munich II	2011–12	Regionalliga Süd	24	1	—		—		24	1
1860 Munich II	2012–13	Regionalliga Bayern	28	2	—		1 (Note: Appearance in the Regionalliga playoff.)	0	29	2
1860 Munich II	2013–14	Regionalliga Bayern	4	0	—		—		2	0
1860 Munich II	Totals		56	3	—		1	0	57	3
1860 Munich	2012–13	2. Bundesliga	6	0	1	0	—		7	0
1860 Munich	2012–13	2. Bundesliga	7	0	1	0	—		8	0
1860 Munich	Totals		13	0	2	0	—		15	0
FC Ingolstadt 04	2014–15	2. Bundesliga	5	0	0	0	—		5	0
FC Ingolstadt 04	2015–16	Bundesliga	1	0	0	0	—		1	0
FC Ingolstadt 04	Totals		6	0	0	0	—		6	0
FC Ingolstadt 04 II	2014–15	Regionalliga Bayern	5	0	—		—		5	0
FC Ingolstadt 04 II	2015–16	Regionalliga Bayern	7	0	—		—		7	0
FC Ingolstadt 04 II	Totals		12	0	—		—		12	0
Hansa Rostock	2015–16	3. Liga	12	0	0	0	—		12	0
Hansa Rostock	2016–17	3. Liga	21	1	1	0	—		22	1
Hansa Rostock	2017–18	3. Liga	35	3	1	0	—		36	3
Hansa Rostock	2018–19	3. Liga	34	0	2	0	—		36	0
Hansa Rostock	Totals		102	4	4	0	—		106	4
Career totals			189	7	6	0	1	0	196	7
