= Voksh =

Voksh Vokshi
- Village
- Location within Kosovo
- Country: Kosovo
- District: Gjakova
- Municipality: Deçan

Population (2024)
  - Total: 378
- Time zone: UTC+1 (Central European Time)
  - Summer (DST): UTC+2 (CEST)

Voksh (Albanian: Vokshi or Voksh) is a village and tribal region situated in western Kosovo^{[a]}, which is inhabited by 570 people, all of whom are Albanians. The village of Voksh is also home to the Vokshi tribe which is part of the larger polyphyletic Thaçi tribe.

== Etymology ==
The name for Vokshi is claimed to stem from the Albanian word vogël, which means "small" or "little".

== Demographics ==
According to the 2011 census, the village had 570 inhabitants, all of whom are Albanian and Muslim. The population of Voksh belongs to the Vokshi tribe, which all belong to the Thaçi tribe according to Robert Elsie. They live in the locally defined Vokshi region that encompasses Drenoc, Lloqan, Pobërgja, Vokshi, Sllup, Prejlep and Prokolluka.

== History ==
=== Middle Ages ===
Voksh is mentioned for the first time in the Dečani chrysobulls in 1330 as a village named Укша (lat. Ukša). An individual bearing the name Bardi Uochsi (alb. Bardhi Ukshi) was recorded in the Venetian cadastre of Scutari of 1416-1417. This individual has been connected to Vokshi by Dhimitër Shuteriqi.

According to oral tradition, the ancestors of all Vokshi tribesmen are the brothers Alë, Tolë and Hodergjon, as well as his nephew Hima.

=== Ottoman period ===
The village of Voksh is mentioned under the name Vokshiq in the Ottoman defter of the Sanjak of Scutari in 1485 as having 19 households.

In 1571 a Mahallah of the village Helshan called Voksha was mentioned in the tax registration of the Sanjak of Dukagjin as having 24 households. A village mentioned as Ternova in the Nahije of Altun-Ili in 1485 was also mentioned with two names in the 16th century, Voksha and Ternova

In 1838 Austrian military physician Joseph Müller noted that 20 mohammedan households lived in the village of Vokś.

The local population resisted the Tanzimat reforms, most notably the League of Prizren member Sulejman Vokshi who took part in the uprising of Dervish Cara and notoriously orchestrated the attack against marshal Mehmet Ali Pasha, which marked the first military action of the league.

=== First Balkan War ===
In 1912 the Montenegrin army embarked on a campaign to forcibly convert the local Albanian population to Orthodox Christianity, which led to people fleeing the village and emigrating to Turkey.

=== Interwar period ===
During the colonization of Kosovo by the Kingdom of Yugoslavia, four colonist families from Montenegro were settled there.

=== Kosovo War ===
During the Kosovo War, 98% of the villages houses were burnt down by Serbian forces, alongside 6 Kulla dwellings. The majority of the population was forced to flee their homes to Albania but was able to return after the war ended.

== Notable people ==
- Sulejman Vokshi
