= Vokshi =

Vokshi is an Albanian surname and tribe. Notable people with the surname include:

- Albana Vokshi (born 1971), Albanian politician
- Asim Vokshi (1909–1937), Albanian Kosovar soldier
- Jonida Vokshi (born 1986), Albanian television presenter and actress
- Sulejman Vokshi (1815–1890), Albanian military commander and politician

The tribe according to Robert Elsie has its origins from the Thaçi tribe. The name for Vokshi is claimed to stem from the Albanian word vogël, which means “small” or “little”.
