= M4P =

Approach in Economic development

The term M4P, now more commonly known as Market Systems Development, refers to an approach in aid and development known as 'Making Markets Work for the Poor'. It seeks to change the way that markets work, so that poor people are included in the benefits of growth and economic development. The aim is to tackle market failures and strengthen the private sector in a way that creates large-scale, lasting benefits for the poor.

All poor people already participate in markets, whether as workers, subsistence farmers, consumers or entrepreneurs. Strengthening these markets in ways that secure higher incomes from or access to goods and services for the poor is therefore seen by M4P advocates as a sustainable way to fight poverty at scale.

The approach utilises systems analysis as a means of diagnosing and addressing the constraints that face poor and disadvantaged people in improving their position within markets. The approach conceptualises systems as inclusive of core markets, supporting functions, and the formal and informal rules that affect how the system works. As such, the market systems approach analyses functions of private market actors, individuals, government organisations and social and cultural norms in order to understand how a system operates.

M4P is an overarching approach to development that provides agencies and governments with the direction required to achieve large-scale, sustainable change in different contexts. Focused on the underlying constraints that prevent the effective development of market systems that involve or exclude poor people.

Market systems approaches to development have now been applied outside the field of enterprise development. Programmes are currently ongoing in health systems; water, hygiene and sanitation; education; land markets; and governance.

== Literature ==
- Albu, M (2007). Comparing M4P and SLA frameworks: complementarities, divergences and synergies. Discussion Paper for SDC, Bern, Switzerland
- Anderson, G & Hitchins, R (2007). Expanding the poor's access to business information and voice through FM radio in Uganda, Making markets work for the poor case studies series, Employment and Income Division, SDC, Bern
- Gibson, A (2006). Developing financial services markets for the poor: FinMark in South Africa; Making markets work for the poor case studies series, Employment and Income Division, SDC, Bern
- Gibson, A (2005). Bringing knowledge to vegetable farmers. Improving embedded information in the distribution system; Katalyst case study No. 1, Dhaka, Bangladesh
- Gibson, A., Scott, H. and Ferrand, D. (2004). Making markets work for the poor. An objective and an approach for governments and development agencies, ComMark, South Africa

== See also ==
- Agricultural marketing
- Private sector development
