= Asim Vokshi =

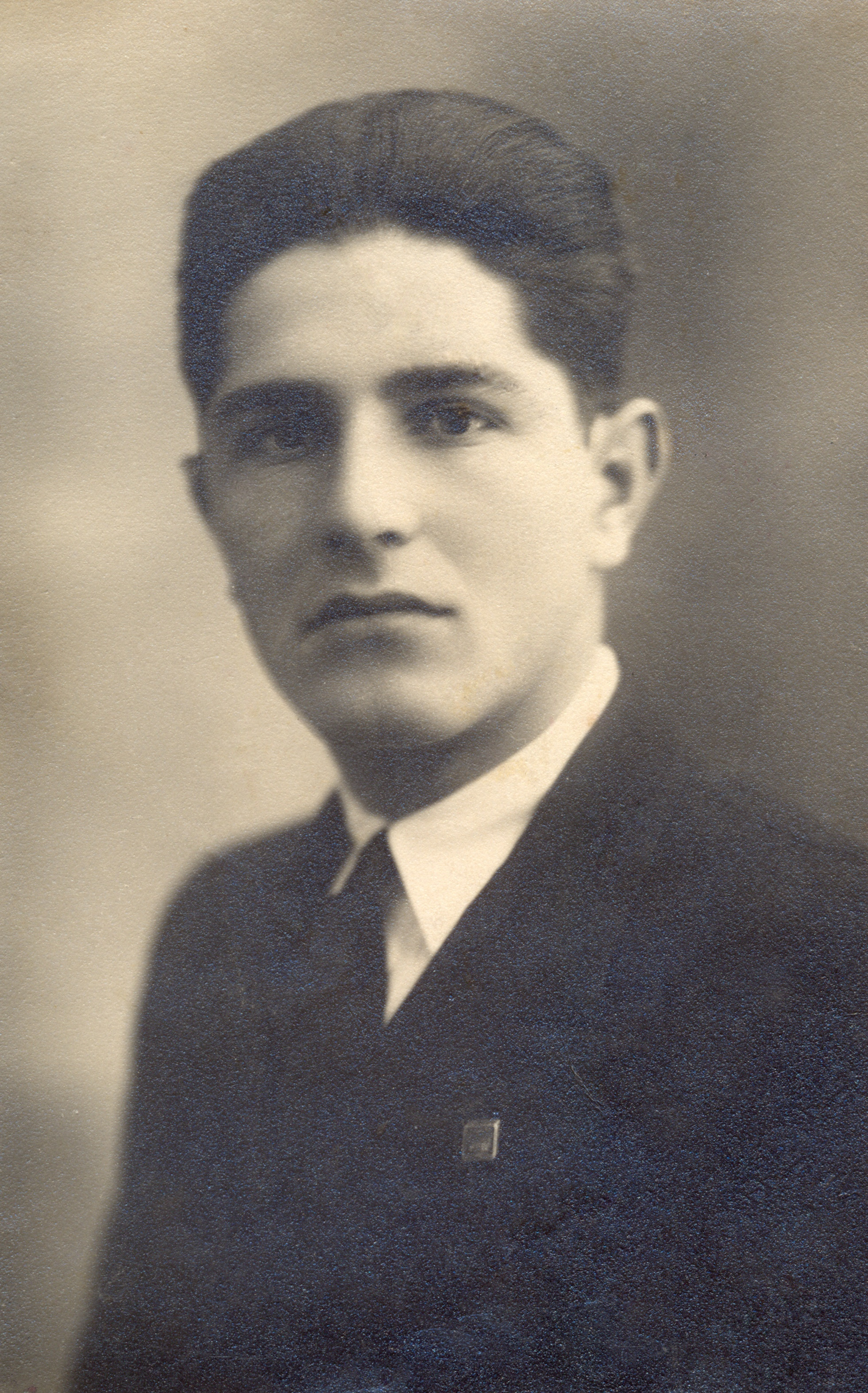
- Asim Vokshi
- Born: 1909; Gjakova, Ottoman Empire
- Died: 4 October 1937 (aged 27–28); Fuentes de Ebro, Spain
- Burial place: Cemetery of the Martyrs, Shkodër, Albania
- Military career
- Allegiance: Second Spanish Republic
- Branch: Spanish Republican Army
- Service years: 1937
- Units: XII International Brigade; Garibaldi Battalion
- Conflicts: Spanish Civil War

Asim Vokshi (1909–1937) was an Albanian Kosovar from Gjakova, Kosovo Vilayet, Ottoman Empire, and studied at a military academy in Italy.

He served as a staff officer in the Garibaldi Battalion of the XII International Brigade during the Spanish Civil War.

He descended from the Vokshi tribe from Voksh, Kosovo, which has their origins from the Thaçi tribe according to Robert Elsie.

He is buried in the Cemetery of the Martyrs, Shkodër, Albania.
