= Sulejman Vokshi =

Kosovar Albanian politician (1815–1890)

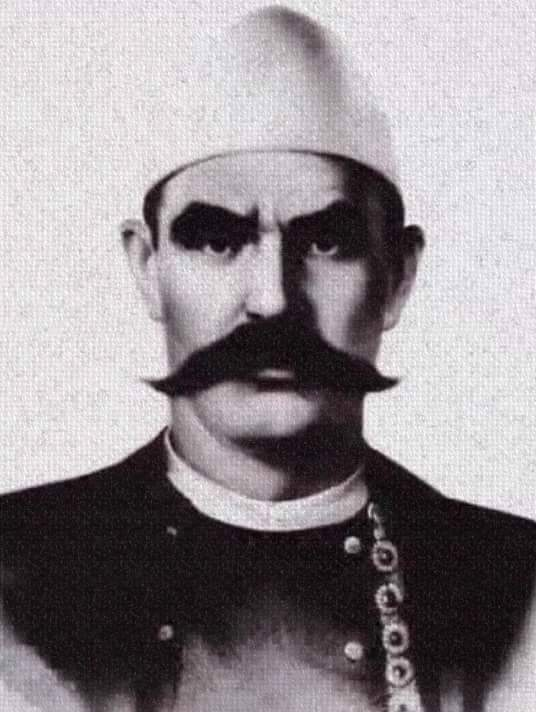
- Born: Sulejman Lokaj; 20 February 1815; Voksh, Gjakova, Ottoman Empire (modern Kosovo)
- Died: 1890 (aged 74–75); Gjakova, Ottoman Empire (modern Kosovo)
- Military career
- Allegiance: League of Prizren
- Conflicts: Albanian Revolt of 1843-1844; Attack against Mehmed Ali Pasha
- Awards: Hero of the People

Sulejman Vokshi (1815 – 1890), also known as Sul Vokshi, was an Albanian military commander and a leader of the League of Prizren. As a member of the central committee of the league, particularly as the head of the finances commission, Vokshi was also an important leader of the organization's military branch and an officer of its military staff.

== Life ==
Sulejman Vokshi was born in Gjakova to a Patriotic Albanian family from Voksh in Kosovo. His family the Vokshi tribe descend from the Thaçi tribe according to Robert Elsie. He participated in the Albanian Revolt of 1843-1844 against the Tanzimat reforms. For his participation, he was interned in Anatolia. In 1878, he was one of the orchestrators of the attack against Ottoman marshal Mehmed Ali Pasha, an event that marked the first military action of the league.

During the consequent Ottoman-Albanian conflict he fought alongside Haxhi Zeka, and Vokshi's Prizren League forces captured the cities of Üsküb (4 January 1881), Pristina and Mitrovica and parts of the Sanjak of Novi Pazar. He was one of the main military leaders of the League. The League was suppressed in late March 1881. He was captured in 1885. Vokshi was initially found guilty of treason and sentenced to death. The sentence was later commuted by sultan Abdul Hamid II to hard labour and imprisonment. He was eventually released during a general amnesty period in the 1890s. He died in Gjakova.

== See also ==
- Albanians in Kosovo
- Ahmet Koronica, attacking commander against Mehmed Ali Pasha
