= Ahmet Koronica =

Albanian military commander

Ahmet Koronica (also known as Ahmet Gjakova) was an Albanian military commander and regional leader of the League of Prizren.

In 1877 he joined the Central Committee for Defending Albanian Rights in Konstantiniyye. The organisation, whose aim was the defense and promotion of Albanian issues, in 1878 became the League of Prizren. As the treaties of the Congress of Berlin determined new frontiers that would allow the annexation of Albanian-inhabited territories of the Ottoman Empire by its neighbour states of the Balkans, the league called a general assembly in the city of Prizren.

In the July 1878 assembly of the league, he was elected a deputy of Yakova, his home region, in the General Council of the organisation. In August of the same year the Ottoman representative in the congress of Berlin general Mehmed Ali Pasha headed to the Kosovo province to disband the league and normalize the transfer of the area of Plav to Montenegro. League leaders Sulejman Vokshi and Ahmet Koronica delivered him an ultimatum to return to the Ottoman capital or face the consequences of an attack against him. Mehmed Ali Pasha dismissed the ultimatum and continued his journey. On September 1, he was stationed in the estates of Abdullah Pasha in Yakova with his total number of retinue reaching 700 and a battalion was expected to reinforce them from Mitroviça. The attack commenced on September 3 and ended three days later with his death, that of Abdullah Pasha and the burning of his estate. The attack marked the beginning of the armed hostilities between the league and the Ottoman state. During the eventually unsuccessful war against the Ottomans, Koronica sold his landed property to support the league. In 1885, he was captured and tried along with Sulejman Vokshi. The records of his trial indicate that he was interned in Anatolia.
