= Attack against Mehmed Ali Pasha =

1878 Albanian victory over the Ottomans

Date	3–6 September 1878
Location	Gjakova, Ottoman Empire (modern Kosovo)
Result	League of Prizren victory

Belligerents
League of Prizren	Ottoman Empire

Commanders and leaders
Ali Pashë Gucia; Ahmet Koronica; Sulejman Vokshi; Riza Bey Gjakova	Mehmed Ali Pasha †; Abdullah Pasha Dreni †; Shaqir Agë Curri (WIA)

Strength
4,500 militants	<4,500 militants

Casualties and losses
<280 killed	280 killed 300 wounded

The Attack against Mehmed Ali Pasha (Turkish: Mehmed Ali Paşa'ya saldırı), known in Albanian historiography as the Action of Gjakova (Albanian: Aksioni i Gjakovës; Turkish: Yakova saldırısı), was undertaken from 3–6 September 1878 by the Gjakova Committee of the League of Prizren in the estate of Abdullah Pasha Dreni near Gjakova. During the battle Mehmed Ali Pasha, the Ottoman marshal who was to overview the cession of the predominantly Albanian Plav and Gusinje region to the Principality of Montenegro, Abdullah Pasha Dreni, a notable official of the region and former member of the league, many Ottoman soldiers, and volunteers of the Gjakova Committee were killed.

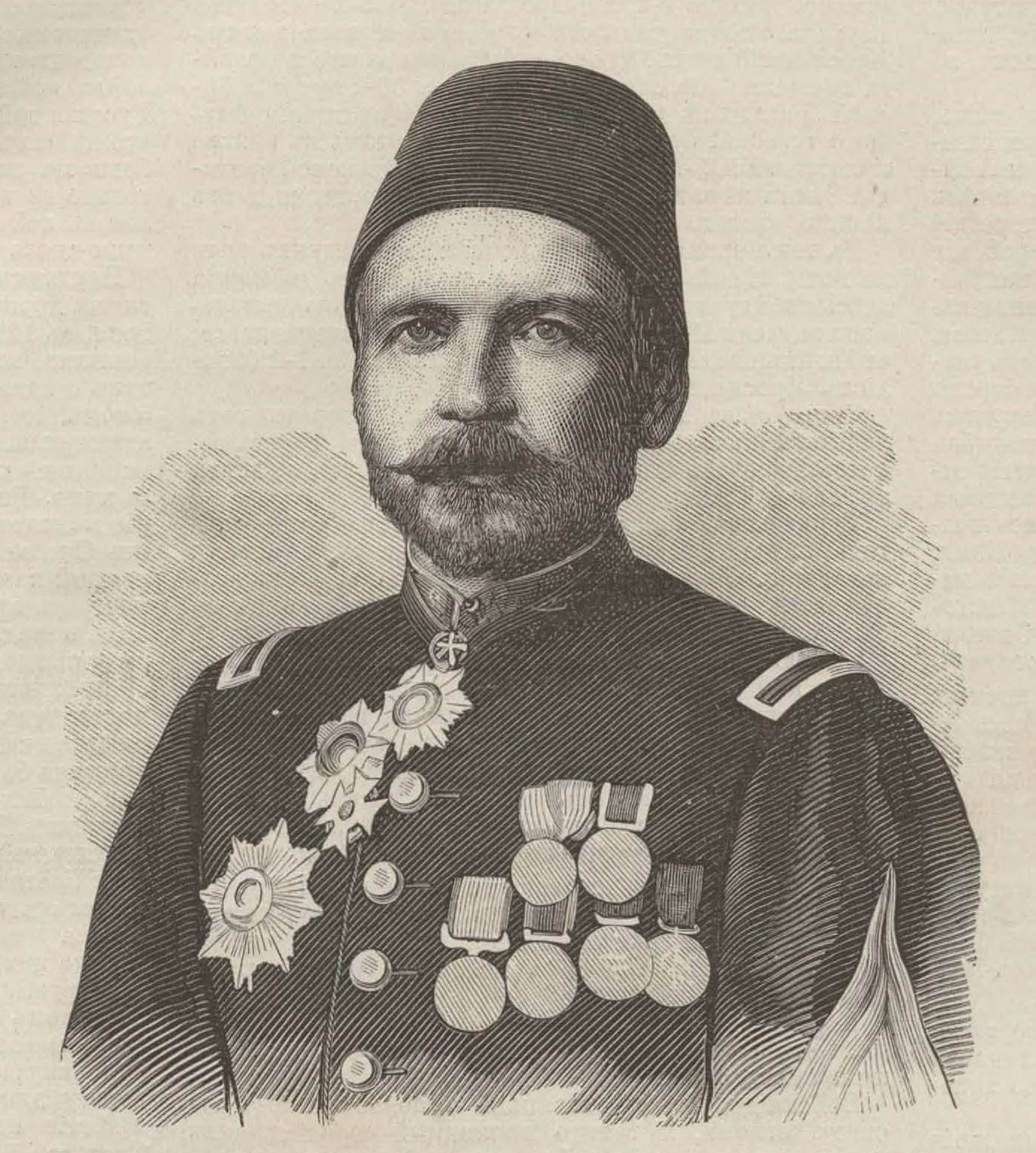
Mehmed Ali Pasha

The attack was the first military operation of the League of Prizren and marked the beginning of hostilities between the organization and the Ottoman Empire. On an international level, it was the first in a series of battles that changed the terms of the Congress of Berlin as regards the cessions to Montenegro and ended with the siege of Ulcinj, which determined the Montenegrin borders until the Balkan Wars.

== Events ==
According to the Treaty of Berlin, the region of Plav and Gusinje was to be ceded by the Ottoman Empire to the Principality of Montenegro. As every other protocol of the treaty that dealt with the annexation of Albanian-inhabited areas of the empire, it was vehemently opposed by the League of Prizren, an Albanian organization, whose goal was the promotion of Albanian self-rule. While other decisions of the treaty opposed by the league were eventually not carried out, thus reducing the territorial gains of the respective signatory states, Plav and Gusinje was included in the area to be ceded. Multiple protests of the league to the Ottoman state and the Great Powers were ignored, while the Russian ultimatum, which among other points stipulated that Russian troops wouldn't evacuate Eastern Rumelia unless the incorporation of those areas to Montenegro was finalized, hastened Ottoman efforts to complete the cession.

On August 20, the Ottoman ministry of foreign affairs informed Nicholas of Montenegro that Mehmed Ali Pasha had been designated to carry out the process. The first task of the marshal was to pacify the league in order to avoid any border conflicts during the territory transfer. However, Mehmed Ali Pasha was highly unpopular among Albanians as he had been the Ottoman representative in the congress of Berlin and in 1871 had led Ottoman troops during an Albanian revolt. Upon arriving in Prizren on August 25, he called a meeting with leading members of the league the following day and gave them a 24-hour ultimatum to cease their activities against the area transfer. On August 27, none of the leaders attended the renewed meeting and a local member killed the marshal's telegrafist in the Marash cafe club of the city. To avoid the escalation of attacks on August 31 Mehmed Ali Pasha left Prizren and reinforced with three battalions move to Gjakova, where he was stationed in the estate of Abdullah Pasha Dreni, a former leader of the local league committee who had joined the Ottoman faction.

As on September 1 the routes from Gjakova to the Ottoman-Montenegrin border were blocked by volunteer forces under Ali Pasha of Gusinje, a leader of the Plav and Gusinje committees, Mehmed Ali Pasha extended his stay in Gjakova and waited for another battalion to arrive from Mitrovica as well as mercenaries from Fandi. The next day, 4,500 volunteer troops under Ahmet Koronica and Sulejman Vokshi blocked all routes in the region and representatives of the Gjakova Committee announced to Abdullah Pasha Dreni that if he did not surrender he would be regarded as an Ottoman during the league's attack. On September 3, the battle commenced with heavy losses on both sides and a 24-hour ceasefire for negotiations was agreed. The evening of September 4 was marked by the continuation of the battle, which the next day subsided mostly to low-level conflicts as the many Ottoman soldiers surrendered, while the soldiers of the Mitrovica battalion, many of whom were Albanians deserted their ranks and joined the volunteer forces upon their arrival.

In the final day of the attack the estate was burnt and Abdullah Pasha Dreni and Mehmed Ali Pasha were killed. In total, around 280 were killed and 300 were wounded during the battle. Between others, Shaqir Aga Curri, a trusted man of Abdullah Pasha and father of the kachak leader Bajram Curri. The inability of the Ottomans to complete the cession to Montenegro, highlighted at an international level the high level of instability of the country even after the 1878 congress. Initially, large contingents of troops were sent from Thessaloniki to Skopje and Ferizaj, but as the Ottoman government deemed the risk of a general revolt too high they were recalled and an official statement, which attributed the attack to "unconsciable elements that would be dealt with in time" was issued. The Sultan also called a meeting Mustafa Tetova, then president of the central committee of Prizren, who after his return to Prizren organized a countermeeting with the league's delegates. Within the organization, the attack's success, which was the league's first military operation, caused the rise of the autonomist and independentist subfactions mainly under Abdyl Frashëri, who presided over the assembly of the Stamboll Committee. On September 27, the decisions of the assembly, which among others included the unification of all Albanian-inhabited areas into a single vilayet with maximal autonomy, were published in Tercuman-i Sark, a newspaper owned by Sami Frashëri in the Ottoman capital.
