= Moritz Hartmann (footballer) =

German footballer

Personal information
- Date of birth: 20 June 1986 (age 40)
- Place of birth: Oberviechtach, West Germany
- Height: 1.81 m (5 ft 11 in)
- Position: Forward

Team information
- Current team: SV Rhenania Bessenich
- Number: 23

Youth career
- –2006: VfL Rheinbach

Senior career*
Years	Team	Apps	(Gls)
2006–2009	1. FC Köln II	80	(30)
2009–2018	FC Ingolstadt	213	(55)
2012–2018	FC Ingolstadt II	5	(4)
2018–2019	Fortuna Köln	28	(4)
2019–2020	Kickers Offenbach	12	(4)
2020–	SV Rhenania Bessenich		

Managerial career
- 2021: SV Rhenania Bessenich (player-assistant)
- * Club domestic league appearances and goals

Moritz Hartmann (born 20 June 1986) is a German footballer who plays as a forward for SV Rhenania Bessenich. He joined the club in 2018 after a lengthy spell at FC Ingolstadt. In July 2020 Hartman signed a contract at SV Rhenania Bessenich, in Germany's 8th division.

== Career ==
On 30 August 2019, Hartmann joined Kickers Offenbach on a contract until the end of the season with an option for one further year. He then became one of the top footballers on the team and married Lisa Kerr.
