= Abdullah Pashë Dreni =

- Born: 1820; Gjakova, Ottoman Empire
- Died: 1878 (aged 57–58) Gjakova, Ottoman Empire
- Allegiance: Ottoman Empire
- Branch: Ottoman Army
- Rank: Pasha

Abdullah Pashë Dreni (1820–1878) was a 19th-century Albanian tribal leader and military of the Ottoman Army.

== Life ==
Abdullah Pashë Dreni was born in 1820 in Gjakova. He served in the Ottoman Empire military, where he notably fought in the Siege of Plevna, a major battle of the Russo-Turkish War (1877–78), after which he received the title of pasha. Mehmed Ali Pasha, Marshal, Chief of Staff of the Ottoman Empire was residing in Dreni's house, when both of them, as well as Dreni's son, were killed under an armed attack of Albanian rebels, which is known as Gjakova's attack in Albanian's historiography. He is mentioned in Gjergj Fishta's Lahuta e Malcís, a national epic poem, where Dreni is described as forced to defend his unwanted guest, because of hospitality laws prescribed in the Albanian kanun.

== Sources ==
- Frashëri, Kristo (2002). Prifti, Kristaq (ed.). Historia e Popullit Shqiptar (in Albanian). Vol. 2. Toena. ISBN 9992716231.
- Elsie, Robert (2012). A Biographical Dictionary of Albanian History. I.B.Tauris. ISBN 978-1-78076-431-3.
