= Valonis Kadrijaj =

German footballer

Personal information
- Date of birth: 23 March 1992 (age 34)
- Place of birth: Đakovica, SFR Yugoslavia
- Height: 1.92 m (6 ft 3 1/2 in)
- Position: Striker

Youth career
- 2000–2007: FC Stern 1919 München
- 2007–2010: SpVgg Unterhaching

Senior career*
| Years | Team | Apps | (Gls) |
| 2010–2012 | SpVgg Unterhaching | 19 | (2) |
| 2013 | SC Pfullendorf | 16 | (2) |
| 2013–2015 | FC Augsburg II | 37 | (12) |
| 2015–2016 | SV Wacker Burghausen | 28 | (2) |
| 2016–2018 | Türkgücü-Ataspor | 9 | (6) |
- * Club domestic league appearances and goals

Valonis Kadrijaj (Serbian Cyrillic: Валонис. Кадријај; born 23 March 1992) is a German professional footballer who plays as a striker.

== Club career ==
Born in Đakovica, SFR Yugoslavia, he moved with his family to Germany. Kadrijaj played youth football for FC Stern 1919 München and SpVgg Unterhaching. He made his senior debut for SpVgg Unterhaching during the 2010–11 season.

== Personal life ==
He holds both Serbian and Kosovo citizenship.
