= Garibaldi Battalion =

- Battaglione Garibaldi
- Flag of the Garibaldi Battalion
- Active: 27 October 1936–24 September 1938
- Country: Kingdom of Italy; Kingdom of Albania
- Allegiance: Spanish Republic
- Branch: International Brigades
- Type: Infantry
- Size: Battalion (1936-1937); Brigade (1937-1938)
- Part of: XII International Brigade
- Patron: Giuseppe Garibaldi
- Engagements: Spanish Civil War: Siege of Madrid; Battle of Jarama; Battle of Guadalajara; Battle of the Ebro

Commanders
- Notable commanders: Randolfo Pacciardi (WIA)

The Garibaldi Battalion (The Garibaldi Brigade after April 1937) was a largely-Italian volunteer unit of the International Brigades that fought on the Republican side of the Spanish Civil War from October 1936 to 1938. It was named after Giuseppe Garibaldi, an Italian military and political figure of the nineteenth century.

== History ==
The Italian Legion was established on 27 October 1936, through an agreement signed in Paris between Italian republicans, socialists and Communists. It was headed by the Republican commander Randolfo Pacciardi and Communist political commissars Antonio Roasio, Luigi Longo and socialist Amedeo Azzi. It was part of the XII International Brigade along with André Marty Battalion and Dimitrov Battalion. It had a baptism of fire on the November 13, 1936 at Cerro de los Ángeles during the Siege of Madrid, then the battalion fought by the University of Madrid, at Pozuelo, Boadilla del Monte, Mirabueno, Majadahonda and Jarama. During the Battle of Jarama, Pacciardi was wounded, and so Ilio Barontini took command of the battalion during the Battle of Guadalajara. Pacciardi was again the commander at Huesca and Villanueva del Pardillo.

In late of April 1937, it was dissolved to form the skeleton of the Garibaldi Brigade, formally established on May 1. Brigade was strengthened by the arrival of the soldiers of Dimitrov battalion and by the volunteers of the dissolved Italian column, and other Italian groups from other formations and many others new volunteers who continue to turn to Spain. The Garibaldi Brigade remained part of the XII International Brigade, under the direction of Randolfo Pacciardi until August 1937; it consisted of four battalions. Then there were five commanders until its dissolution on September 24, 1938. In addition to operations in the north of the current Community of Madrid and parts of Aragon, it played its most prominent role in the Battle of the Ebro.

Mehmet Shehu, future Prime Minister of Albania, was among the volunteers. Other notable Albanian members include Veli Dedi, Petro Marko, Shaban Basha, Thimjo Gogozoto and Asim Vokshi, one of the staff officers of the battalion.

== Personnel ==
- Amedeo Azzi – political commissar
- Shaban Basha
- Ilio Barontini
- Veli Dedi
- Thimjo Gogozoto
- Luigi Longo
- Petro Marko
- Randolfo Pacciardi – commander
- Antonio Roasio
- Mehmet Shehu
- Asim Vokshi

== See also ==
- List of military units named after people

== Bibliography ==
- Luigi Arbizzani, P. Mondini Garibaldini in Spagna e nella Resistenza bolognese, Quaderni de "La Lotta", 1966
- Sandro Attanasio, Gli italiani e la guerra di Spagna, Mursia
- Giacomo Calandrone, La Spagna brucia: cronache garibaldine, Roma, Editori Riuniti
- Giulia Canali, L'antifascismo italiano e la guerra civile spagnola, Manni
- Aldo Garosci, Gli intellettuali e la guerra di Spagna , Milano, Einaudi, 1959
- Aldo Garosci, Umberto Marzocchi, Carlo Rosselli, Giustizia e libertà nella lotta antifascista e nella storia d'Italia, La Nuova Italia, 1978
- Luigi Longo, Le brigate internazionali in Spagna, Roma, Editori Riuniti, 1956
- Randolfo Pacciardi, Il battaglione Garibaldi, Lugano 1938.
- Giovanni Pesce, Senza tregua, Milano, Feltrinelli, 1973
- Carlo Rosselli, Oggi in Spagna domani in Italia, Milano, Einaudi, 1967
