= Thaçi (tribe) =

Historic Albanian tribe

Thaçi (Note: Pronounced /ˈθætʃi/ THATCH-ee; Albanian pronunciation: ['θɑ:t͡ɕɪ].) is a historical Albanian tribe (fis) and region in Pukë, Northern Albania. The ancestors of the Thaçi tribe are said to have migrated from Muriqan in Ana Malit. The Thaçi are often referred to as courageous and smart people by the neighboring tribes due to their supposed qualities of cunning and craftiness.

== Geography ==
The historical tribal area of the Thaçi is south of the river Drin in the District of Pukë. Essentially it is south and southeast of Fierza. The Thaçi also border the Berisha which is another tribe from Pukë. The Thaçi throughout the years have settled in many more areas than just Pukë. Descendants of the Thaçi tribe can be found in Kosovo and the Vokshi tribe stem from the Thaçi tribe.

== Origins ==
The Thaçi were of polyphyletic origin, thus, they are not a traditional Albanian fis in the sense that they do not claim descendant from a common male ancestor.

== History ==
According to Franz Nopcsa, the ancestors of the Thaçi come from Montenegro. One of the ancestors of the Thaçi fled from Bushat into the mountains of Berisha around 1450–1480. His descendant, called Gjeci, moved to Kodra e Gëges in Kryeziu territory. He had three sons who grew up there: Geg Gjeci, Buç Gjeci and Pren Gjeci. They lived during the 1650s. Buç and Geg decided to convert to Islam, but they were afraid of Pren's reaction so they decided to keep their intentions a secret. Buç converted, but when Geg was supposed to, he grew fearful of what his older brother might do. Geg told Pren that he had gone back on his intentions to convert to Islam, whilst he told Buç that he already had and he pledged that neither he nor his descendants would ever eat pork. Buç became the ancestral father of the Muslim Thaçi, whilst Geg and Pren became the ancestral father for the rest of the Thaçi. Geg Gjeci's descendants kept their pledge until the early 20th century. This almost ended up in a shoot out between the liberal and conservative descendants of Geg Gjeci.

The three brothers split up after the near violent event occurred. For this reason, the newcomers placed themselves under the protection of the ancestors of Liman Aga. Initially, the protection was to their advantage because they succeeded in pushing the Berisha out, down to the Lumi i Dardhës (Dardha River). Later, however, their liege lord, a certain Sulejman Aga, began to bully them and even went so far as to demand Bal Alija, who lived around 1780, to bring a sheaf of grain back from a mountainside where grain did not grow. This was not the end of it. He scolded Bal Alija and sent him back up the mountain. This deed led to a revolt among the Thaçi against their landowner. They refused to recognize his authorities and the conflict has resulted in a good number of persistent skirmishes up to recent times. Because the Bugjoni drove the Berisha out, there is still hereditary hostility between the two tribes today, and a murder committed between them cannot be atoned for with money.

The Thaçi proved to be very difficult to rule during the Ottoman period. The Ottoman Turks eventually grew tired and, in 1744, they burnt down the houses of around 105 families which forced them to migrate into the Gjakova region. According to Robert Elsie, the Vokshi tribe, which settled in Kosovo in the region between Junik and Deçan, specifically in the villages of Junik, Lloçan and Pobërxhe, originated from Thaçi. In addition to this tribe, it is said that the Elshani, Sopi and Kabashi tribes are also descended from the Thaçi tribe.

== Genetic ancestry and origin ==
E-PH2180 is a genetic branch belonging to haplogroup E-V13. Within E-PH2180 are further subdivisions including E-PH2180>Y30588.

This branch is closely related to the Thaçi tribe, the Berisha e Kuqe tribe in Drenica and a Berishe e Shtime family. There is also genetic evidence from Argentina, but this indicates an origin from the Dalmatian islands. The Thaçi tribe is a standout among the Drin tribes as it falls under E-PH2180. The ancestry of the Thaçi lineage is traced back to the Albanian Alps, which is consistent with previous genetic studies. There are also various oral traditions linking the origin of the Thaçi families to Montenegro or other northwestern areas, but these connections occurred in very early times, before the current tribal structures emerged.

Similar genetic results were also found in families of the Thaçi tribe in Drenica and Kaçanik. These genetic studies help to better understand the historical connection and origins of Thaçi families and their branches, which can date back up to 1,300 years.

== Notable people ==
- Sulejman Vokshi - Albanian military commander and a leader of the League of Prizren
- Hashim Thaçi - Kosovar politician who was the President of Kosovo from April 2016 until his resignation on 5 November 2020
- Iljaz Prokshi - Kosovar Albanian writer and poet
- Menduh Thaçi - Leader of the Macedonian political party Democratic Party of Albanians
- Fatmir Limaj - Kosovo-Albanian politician
- Bedri Pejani (or Bedri bej Ipeku; 10 October 1885 – 6 July 1946) was 20th century Albanian politician. During World War II, he was one of the founders of the Second League of Prizren. Born as Bedri Abdi Thaçi, his father was Abdi Thaçi.
- Adelina Thaçi (born May 31, 1980) is a Kosovo-Albanian singer and vocal teacher.
- Muhamed Thaçi - Macedonian-Kosovan basketball coach and former player
- Bler Thaçi (born 4 August 1999) is a Kosovar professional footballer who plays as a midfielder.
- Ramush Haradinaj - Kosovo-Albanian politician
- Luan Haradinaj - Soldier
- Aqif Blyta (1887–1945) was a 20th-century Albanian politician and military leader from Novi Pazar. He was the mayor of Novi Pazar and a member of the Second League of Prizren. His paternal family originated from Gjakova and belonged to the Thaçi (Thaqi) fis.
