= Destruction of Albanian heritage in Kosovo =

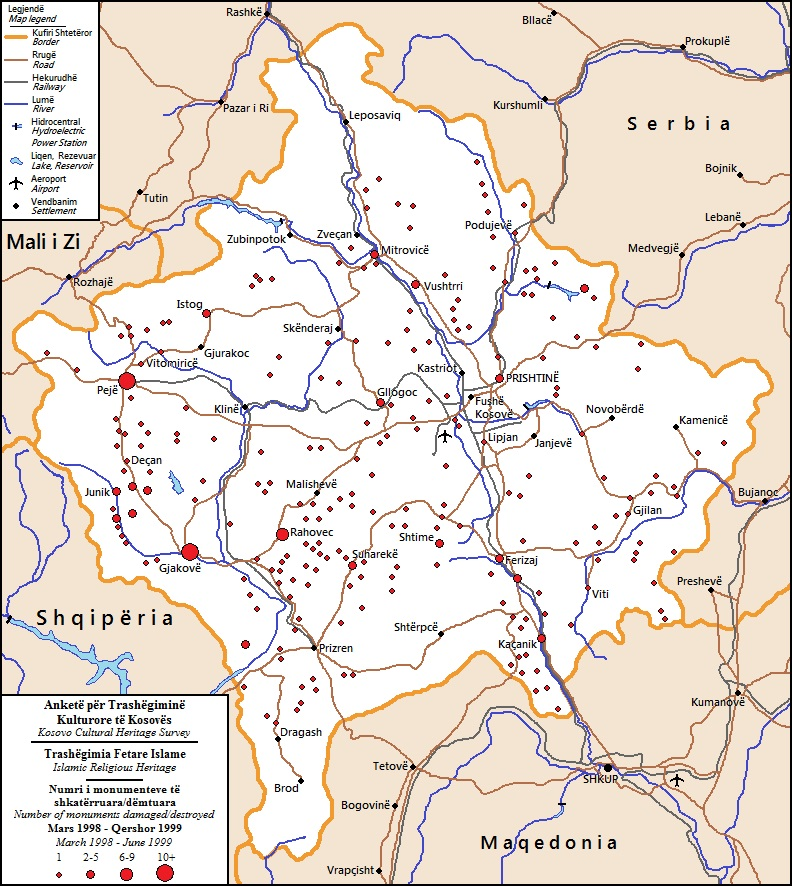
Damaged and destroyed Islamic monuments during the Kosovo conflict (1998-1999)

The architectural heritage of the Kosovo Albanians during Yugoslav rule was shown institutionalised disregard for decades prior to outright conflict at the end of the 20th century. Numerous Albanian cultural sites in Kosovo were destroyed during the period of Yugoslav rule and especially the Kosovo conflict (1998-1999) which constituted a war crime violating the Hague and Geneva Conventions. In all, 225 out of 600 mosques in Kosovo were damaged, vandalised, or destroyed alongside other Islamic architecture during the conflict. Additionally 500 Albanian owned kulla dwellings (traditional stone tower houses) and three out of four well-preserved Ottoman period urban centres located in Kosovo cities were badly damaged resulting in great loss of traditional architecture. Kosovo's public libraries, of which 65 out of 183 were completely destroyed, amounted to a loss of 900,588 volumes, while Islamic libraries sustained damage or destruction resulting in the loss of rare books, manuscripts and other collections of literature. Archives belonging to the Islamic Community of Kosovo, records spanning 500 years, were also destroyed. During the war, Islamic architectural heritage posed for Yugoslav Serb paramilitary and military forces as Albanian patrimony with destruction of non-Serbian architectural heritage being a methodical and planned component of ethnic cleansing in Kosovo.

== History ==
=== Yugoslav Period ===
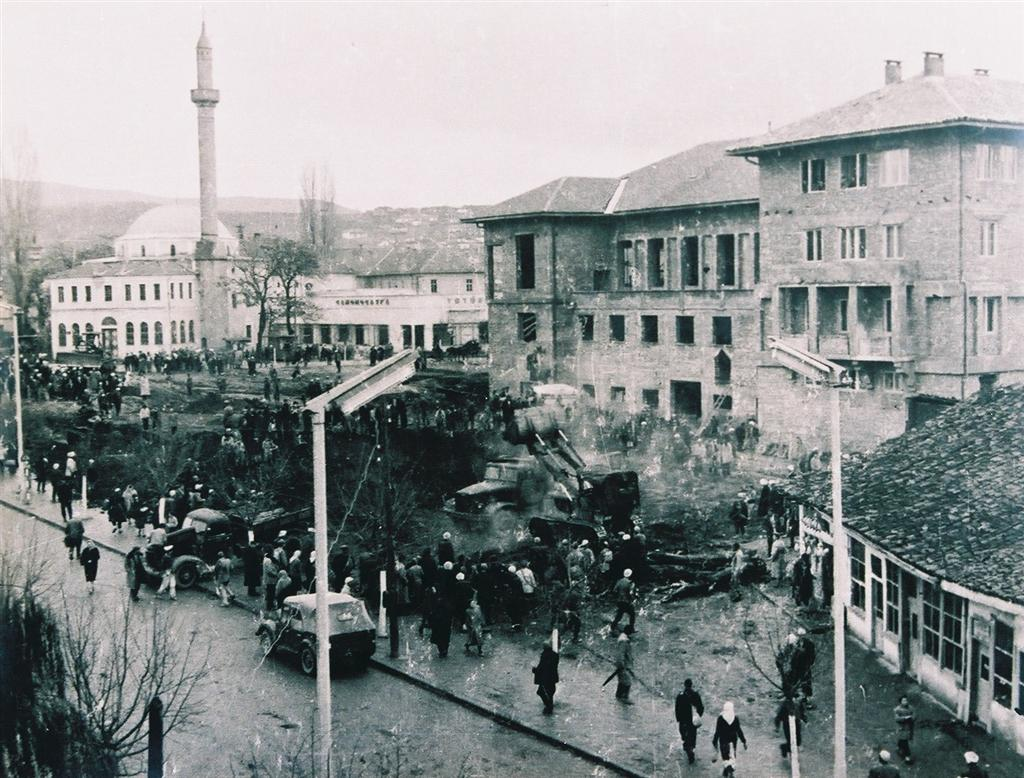
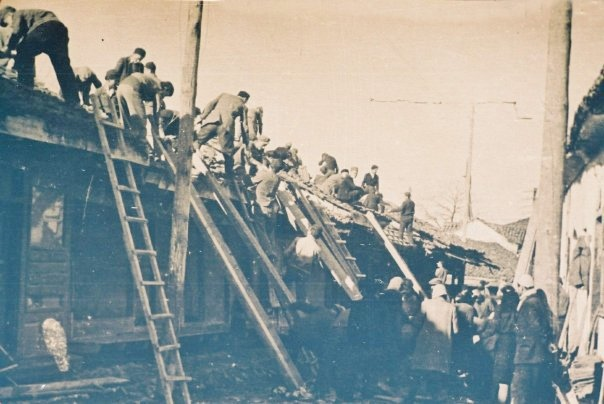
Pristina bazaar, being destroyed by labour brigades called Popular Fronts

For around five centuries being a province of the Ottoman Empire, numerous examples of Ottoman architecture existed in Kosovo. In the aftermath of World War Two, Yugoslavia was governed by communist authorities who implemented various modernisation drives toward changing the architectural landscape and design of urban settlements. These measures were aimed at altering the panorama of a settlement that was deemed to have elements associated with an unwanted Ottoman past and features deemed as "backward". Starting from the late 1940s, architectural heritage in main urban centres of Kosovo began to be destroyed, mainly conducted by the local government as part of urban modernisation schemes. During the 1950s this process was undertaken by the Urban Planning Institute (Urbanistički zavod) of Yugoslavia with the most prominent example in Kosovo of the socialist modernisation drive being in Pristina. The Ottoman Pristina bazaar contained 200 shops set in blocks devoted to a craft or guild owned by Albanians grouped around a mosque, located in the centre of Pristina. These buildings were expropriated in 1947 and demolished by labour brigades known as Popular Fronts (Albanian: Fronti populluer, Serbian: Narodnifront).

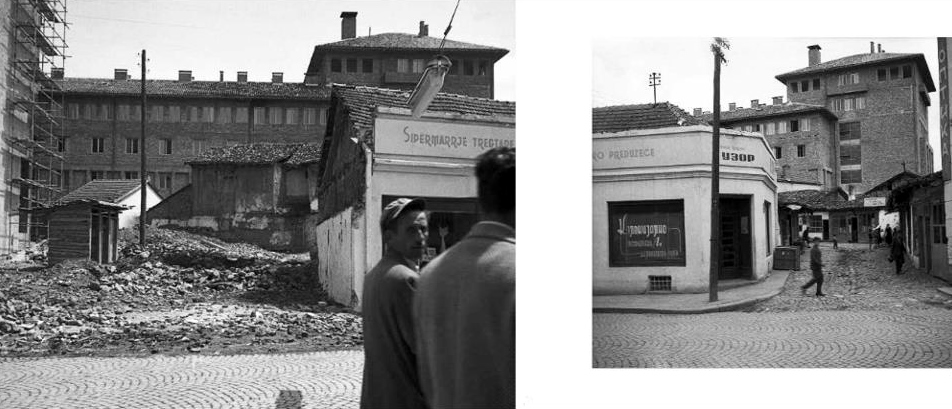
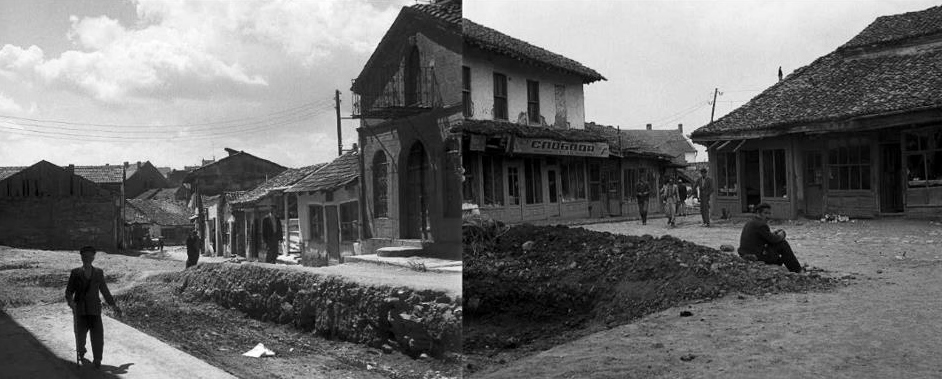
Pristina bazaar, with construction of new buildings and destroyed and non-destroyed buildings

In 1952, the Yugoslav government founded the Institute for the Protection of Cultural Monuments of Kosovo tasked with dealing with issues relating to cultural heritage in Kosovo. During post-war communist Yugoslavia, only one Ottoman era monument the Tomb of Sultan Murad I was listed as a cultural monument, while state protection status was given mainly to Serbian Orthodox Church architecture in Kosovo. The criteria for listing mosques as historic monuments was much more restrictive than for Serbian Orthodox architecture. Buildings who had protection status received funding for historical preservation, while unlisted mosques, many from the Ottoman period that were renovated during this time was done without the Institute's supervision often resulting in damage or original architectural elements being destroyed. On the eve of the Kosovo conflict, only 15 mosques out of the 600 or more mosques had been awarded the status of historic monument, unlike 210 Orthodox Serbian churches, gravesites and monasteries that had been awarded the status of protected historic monument.

=== Kosovo Conflict (1998-1999) ===
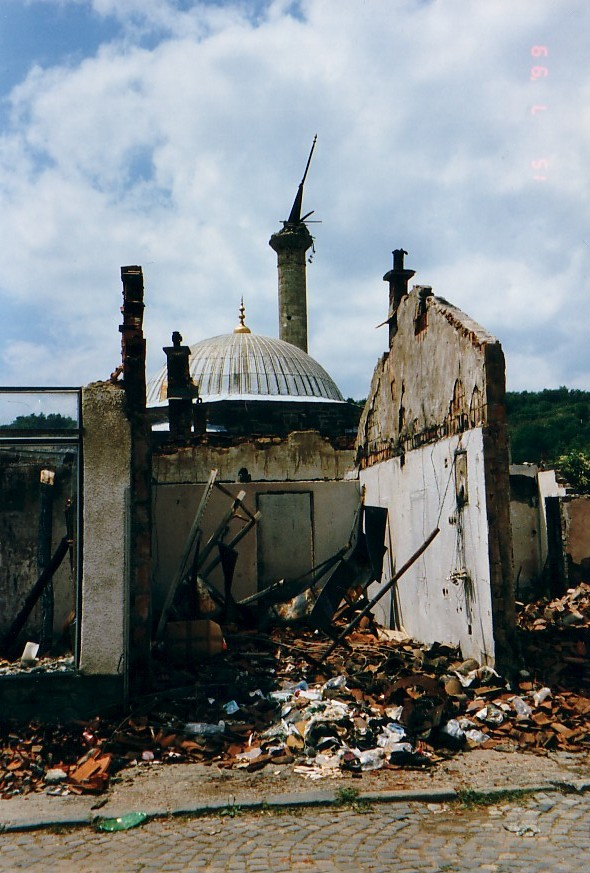
Destroyed house with damaged Hadum Mosque in the background in Gjakove, 1999

The Kosovo conflict triggered a counter-insurgency campaign in 1998-1999 by Yugoslav Serb armed forces (VJ) fighting against Kosovo Liberation Army (KLA) fighters that escalated into the Kosovo war (1999) and military intervention from the North Atlantic Treaty Organization (NATO). During the counter-insurgency campaign Yugoslav Serb forces targeted collections of various state archives and buildings, museums and libraries; Islamic libraries, Muslim theological schools and Sufi lodges (tekkes).

Before the 1999 war, the reserve collection consisting of multiple deposit copies of publications at the National Library of Kosovo in Pristina kept for use within Kosovo for other libraries, was pulped at the Lipjan paper mill through an order by the Serbian library director. During the 1999 war, 65 (a third of a total of 183) Kosovo public libraries were fully destroyed resulting in the combined loss of 900,588 volumes. Kosovo school libraries were destroyed during the war. In 1999, certain archives and collections were also removed from Kosovo into Serbia, such as the archive of the Institute for the Protection of Monuments of Kosovo from the organisation's building in Pristina by employees belonging to the Yugoslav Ministry of Interior. The Yugoslav Serbian Ministry of Justice claimed that the removal of public records from Kosovo to Serbia in 1999 was "to prevent the Albanian secessionists from destroying or forging [them]". Some Kosovo municipal registries were also burned where they were held.

The central historical archive belonging to the Islamic Community of Kosovo containing community records spanning 500 years was burned down on June 13, 1999 by Yugoslav Serb police after an armistice and some hours before NATO peacekeeping troops came to Pristina. Of Sufi lodges, the Axhize Baba Bektashi teqe in Gjakovë was burned during May by Yugoslav Serb soldiers using shoulder-launched incendiary grenades resulting in the loss of 2,000 rare books and over 250 manuscripts like a 12th century Persian manuscript. The Hadum Suleiman Aga library (founded 1595) in Gjakovë, was burned down (March 24) by Yugoslav Serb troops resulting in the loss of 1,300 rare books and 200 manuscripts written in Aljamiado (Albanian in Arabic script), Arabic and Ottoman Turkish along with the regional archives of the Islamic Community spanning to the 17th century. In Pejë, the library of Atik Medrese was burned down with only its outer walls remaining, resulting in the loss of 100 manuscript codices and 2,000 printed books. In Ferizaj the Atik Medrese theological school dating from the Ottoman period was burned down with its remains being bulldozed. The League of Prizren museum in Prizren was destroyed with rifle-propelled grenades by Yugoslav Serb police during March 1999.

In the aftermath of the war, a report in August 1999 by Physicians for Human Rights (PHR) documented that within Kosovo 155 mosques were destroyed, based on accounts by refugees. According to the Islamic Community of Kosovo the duration of conflict resulted in an estimated 217 mosques being damaged, destroyed or demolished along with 4 madrassas (traditional Muslim schools) and 3 Sufi lodges. Of the 498 mosques in Kosovo that were in active use, the International Criminal Tribunal for the former Yugoslavia (ICTY) documented that 225 mosques sustained damage or destruction by the Yugoslav Serb army. In all, eighteen months of the Yugoslav Serb counterinsurgency campaign between 1998-1999 within Kosovo resulted in 225 or a third out of a total of 600 mosques being damaged, vandalised, or destroyed. Some Islamic architecture was damaged within the context of the fighting.

Mosques and other Islamic buildings however in certain urban neighbourhoods and villages became the only targets of violence against architecture, while in other locations every mosque and all Islamic buildings became targeted. Often at the conclusion of an attack on a village and the fleeing of the population from villages, towns and cities, attacks on mosques, other Islamic buildings and architecture were undertaken and widespread by the Yugoslav Serb army. Attacks at times entailed the toppling of a mosque minaret, having minaret tops shot off, explosive devices placed in a minaret or within a mosque, bulldozing of mosques, fires started in a mosque, artillery aimed at a minaret and walls riddled with bullets. The vandalisation of mosques also occurred, anti-Albanian and anti-Islamic vandalism, the graffiting of facades with images and text and in certain examples, anti-Albanian and pro-Serbian graffiti was inscribed on the walls of a mosque. Graffiti left on mosques by the Yugoslav Serb army often had the words "Kosovo je Srbija" (Kosovo is Serbia), "Srbija" (Serbia), "Mi smo Srbi" (We are Serbs) while the most common graffiti was a cross with four Cyrillic Cs in each corner, a Serbian national symbol. In an in depth survey conducted by Physicians for Human Rights of Kosovo Albanian refugees, it found they were often not present to see the destruction of Islamic architecture due to their flight. These events were also corroborated in reports by human rights organisations regarding the activities of Yugoslav Serb forces and their intended victims being limited in seeing such destruction. There were in some cases eyewitnesses to these attacks on historic monuments.

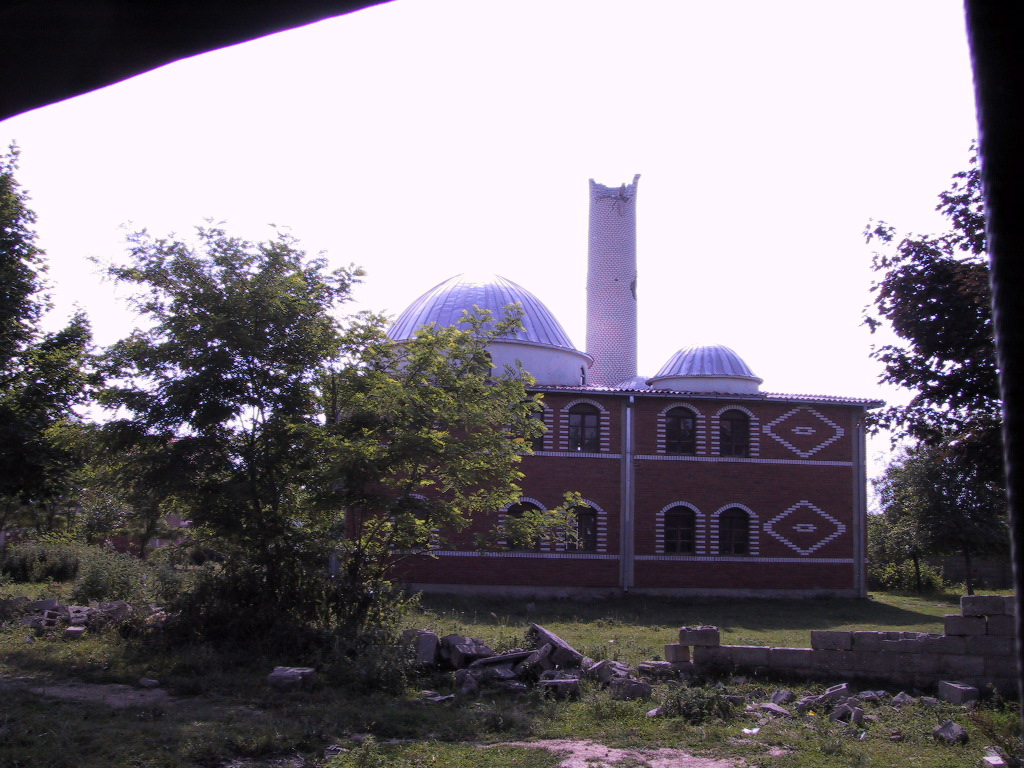
Mosque with minaret top blown off near Skënderaj, Kosovo 1999

Vandalisation of Kosovo Albanian Catholic churches also occurred. The Catholic Church of St Anthony located in Gjakovë had major damage done by Yugoslav Serb soldiers. In Pristina, Yugoslav Serb officers ejected nuns and a priest from the Catholic church of St. Anthony and installed aircraft radar in the steeple which resulted in NATO bombing of the church and surrounding houses. Additionally 500 or 90 percent of kulla dwellings belonging to prominent Albanian families along with historic bazaars were targeted; where three out of four well preserved Ottoman period urban centres located in Kosovo cities being badly damaged resulting in great loss of traditional architecture. The targeted architecture sustained damage that was not collateral. Monuments that were destroyed and damaged were in areas often at lightly-damaged and undisturbed situations, indicating that the damage done was deliberate and not a result of architecture being caught in the crossfire of military combat. During the war (March–June 1999) the United Nations High Commission on Refugees (UNHCR) estimated that 70,000 homes in Kosovo were destroyed.

In Kosovo, the destruction of historical architecture occurred within the context of the Serbian campaign of ethnic cleansing which followed a pattern that happened in Bosnia and was made worse, due to lessons of efficiency learned from that conflict. The destruction of non-Serbian architectural heritage was a methodical and planned component of ethnic cleansing in Kosovo. Harvard University scholars Andrew Herscher and András Riedlmayer note that the destruction of individual homes and properties in addition to historic architecture signified that the entire Kosovo Albanian population was targeted as a culturally defined entity during the conflict.

== Legacy ==
In the aftermath of the Kosovo war (1999) reports from journalists and refugees about the destruction of Kosovo cultural heritage emerged and a need to investigate those allegations and to document damage arose. The United Nations (UN) established a civil administration in Kosovo however one of its agencies the United Nations Educational, Scientific and Cultural Organization (UNESCO) that deals with cultural heritage issues had no plans to undertake such an examination. Andrew Herscher and Andras Riedlmayer instead conducted research, raised funds and 3 months after the 1999 war ended went in October to Kosovo and documented damage done to cultural heritage institutions and buildings. With the conclusion of the field survey, their findings and documentation were placed into a database, a final report was written with copies given to the Department of Culture of the UN Mission in Kosovo and the Office of the Prosecutor presiding over the UN war crimes tribunal at The Hague.

=== Trial of Slobodan Milošević ===
In the trial of Slobodan Milošević (2002-2006), Yugoslav Serb president during the Kosovo war (1999), the ICTY indictment against him referred to methods of persecution done against Kosovo Albanians to "wreak systematic and wanton destruction and damage to their religious sites and cultural monuments". The prosecution in the trial sought to prove Milošević guilty of those actions and events. In his defense, Milošević asserted that Kosovo Albanian heritage sites, in addition to Serb Orthodox historical and religious monuments were damaged by NATO bombing. Yugoslav Serb authorities in several cases alleged that NATO destroyed monuments, however the investigative team led by András Riedlmayer found them intact like two Ottoman bridges and the Sinan Pasha Mosque. Investigators absolved NATO of responsibility except for damage to a village mosque roof and a disused Catholic church damaged through an air blast after a nearby army base was struck by a missile. Riedlmayer's report to the trial concluded that kulla dwellings and a third of mosques were subjected to damage and destruction, with three Ottoman period urban centres being devastated due to intentionally lit fires. The report also noted that the Yugoslav Serb army, paramilitary and police forces and in some instances Serb civilians did those attacks, according to eyewitness accounts. Riedlmayer found out that Yugoslav Serb forces used as bases of operation two Catholic churches which in international law was prohibited. The investigative team noted that destruction and damage of Kosovo Albanian heritage sites were done during the 1999 war through ground attack and not air strikes. With weeks left before the conclusion of the trial, no verdict was reached due to Milošević's death in March, 2006.

=== Post war Kosovo ===
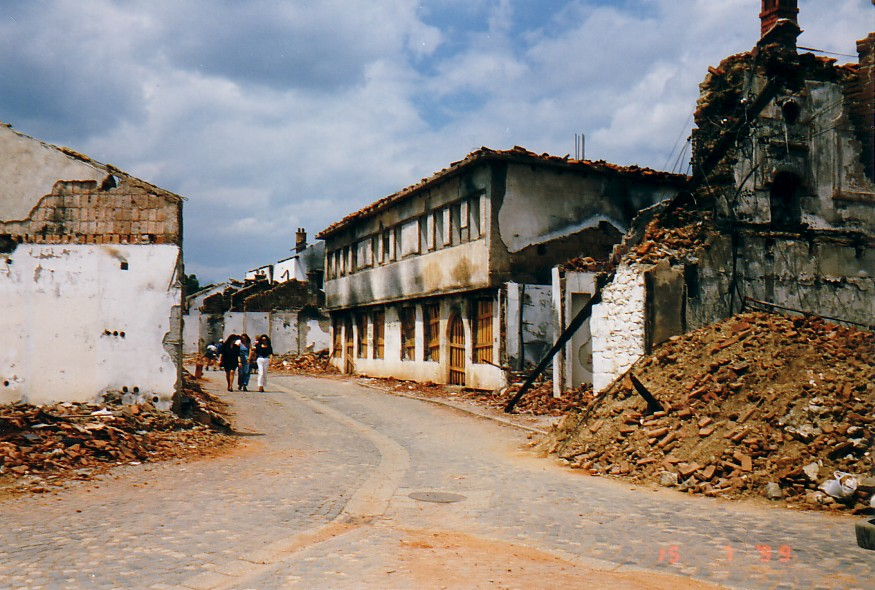
Panorama of destroyed Old Bazaar in Gjakova, 1999

Destruction of multiple Serbian churches occurred in a post-conflict environment done by members of the Albanian community, who viewed that architectural heritage as a surrogate for revenge against the Milošević government and its military forces for violence committed during the Kosovo conflict (1998-1999). The Serbian government has used such attacks as a basis to petition the United Nations to allow its police and armed forces to return and guard historical monuments in Kosovo. The petition did not succeed however, and the post-conflict attacks on Serbian cultural heritage have been used by Serbian cultural institutions to deflect focus from attacks on Albanian cultural heritage done during the war. Those institutions reported upon the post-conflict damage done toward Orthodox Serbian heritage and produced reports that have been accepted by international cultural heritage institutions as neutral and objective assessments.

Little awareness or concern has appeared for the cultural heritage belonging to Kosovo Albanians that was damaged during the war. The Serbian government only once officially acknowledged that Albanian cultural heritage had been damaged within the context of an assessment of NATO war crimes, that also entailed the aerial bombing of several Albanian historical monuments. Meagre legal attention toward severely damaged Islamic heritage has occurred apart from the ICTY's documentation of destroyed and damaged Kosovo mosques. There has been a reluctance to acknowledge damage done toward Albanian cultural heritage in Kosovo by the international community. The international community has viewed its mission in Kosovo as a humanitarian one to provide for Kosovo's populace and the issue of damaged cultural heritage has been sidelined toward focus on Kosovo's "reconstruction".

The Islamic Community of Kosovo since 1999 has through funding from various sources been engaged in the reconstruction of 113 damaged mosques from the Kosovo conflict. In all, some 211 mosques damaged due to the Kosovo conflict have been reconstructed through contributions from donors and local communities, non-governmental agencies and foreign governments such as assistance from some Muslim countries, in particular Turkey and Arab states.

Islamic charities entered Kosovo and rebuilt Ottoman period mosques destroyed during the war in the Gulf Arab style while also being responsible for destroying centuries old religious complexes and mosques under the cover of "reconstruction". Journalists in Kosovo reported that assistance to local communities was dependent on them allowing permission for a particular Islamic charity to reconstruct local mosques. Libraries, gravestones and mausoleums which were centuries old became subject to destruction by Islamic charities as they viewed them to be "idolatrous".

Assistance from Western institutions and countries toward mosque reconstruction have occurred, such as the Italian government rebuilding two mosques in Pejë and Harvard University rebuilding a main mosque in Gjakovë. The Jews in Kosovo also funded the rebuilding of a mosque in Gjakovë. The protection, restoration and rebuilding of Islamic architectural monuments and heritage has not received much interest from Kosovo state authorities in contrast to architecture belonging to the Serbian Orthodox Church.

== See also ==
- War crimes in the Kosovo War
- Cultural heritage of Kosovo
- List of destroyed heritage
- Anti-Albanian sentiment
- Destruction of Serbian heritage in Kosovo
