= Gjakova Regional Museum =

Museum in Kosovo

The Gjakova Regional Museum is a museum in Gjakova, Kosovo.

== History ==
The Gjakova Regional Museum was founded on October 9, 1951, initially as a municipal institution. At first it was used to house exhibits from the Kosovo Operation (1944), later supplemented by archaeological and field ethnographic materials. In 1971, the City Council transferred the museum to the regional government. The museum has three faculty employees and a custodian, but lacks an ethnographer. The history section features 3,800 documents, mainly from the period of the Albanian National Awakening, including an extensive collection on the League of Prizren. The ethnography section includes 900 items, though traditional costumes are sparse. Researchers at the museum study the regions of Has, Dushkaja, Mira, and Keqa.

== See also ==
- Culture of Gjakova
