= András Riedlmayer =

American historian of Islamic art (1947–2026)

András J. Riedlmayer (1947 – 9 February 2026) was an American art historian and librarian.

== Life and career ==
Riedlmayer was born in Budapest, Hungary, in 1947. His father was an architect at the Hungarian Institute for the Protection of Monuments. His family fled Hungary and were refugees in West Germany before settling in Chicago.

Riedlmayer studied at the University of Chicago and at Princeton University, where he lectured in Ottoman history and Near Eastern Studies. He studied Library Science at Simmons College and studied in Turkey on a Fulbright Scholarship before taking a position at the Harvard University’s Fine Arts Library in 1985, later serving as director of the Documentation Center of the Aga Khan Program for Islamic Architecture. He also served as president of the Ottoman and Turkish Studies Association, a board member of the Islamic Manuscript Association, an executive committee member of the Middle East Librarians Association, and collaborator with Muqarnas.

In 1993, following the damage of National and University Library of Bosnia and Herzegovina and destruction of the Oriental Institute in Sarajevo, Riedlmayer convened the Bosnian Manuscript Ingathering Project to preserve records and copies of the destroyed manuscript collection. He was expert witness for the Prosecution on the systematic destruction of cultural heritage in Bosnia and Herzegovina in 1992 and 1996, and destruction of cultural heritage of Kosovo in 1999, at the International Criminal Tribunal for the former Yugoslavia in the trials of Slobodan Milošević, Vojislav Šešelj, and Radovan Karadžić.

In 2003, Riedlmayer organized the Middle East Librarians Association's Committee on Iraqi Libraries to document looting and destruction in US invasion of Iraq and coordinate support for Iraqi librarians. In 2025, he was also documenting destruction of cultural heritage during the Gaza war.

Riedlmayer was interviewed as an expert in Tim Slade's 2016 documentary Destruction of Memory.

Riedlmayer died on 9 February 2026, at the age of 79.
