= Culture of Gjakova =

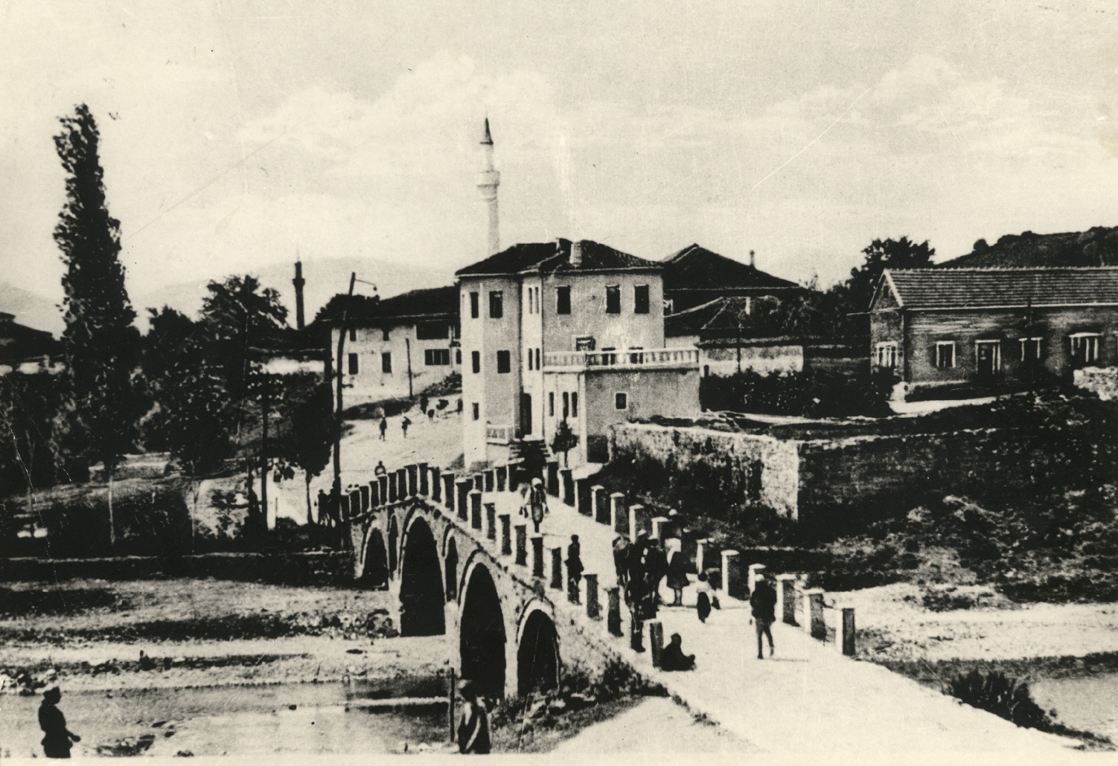
Old image of Gjakova

The Kosovan city of Gjakova has been populated since the prehistoric era. During the medieval period, in 1485, Gjakova is mentioned as a village, concretely as a market place.

Gjakova served as a trading center on the route between Shkodër and Istanbul. The old town of Gjakova was one of the most developed trade centers during the rule of the Ottoman Empire in Balkans. A testimony to this period is the Grand Shopping area (çarshia e madhe) located in the center of the old town, containing many preserved and restored shops and residential buildings. Shopping was developed around the Hadum Mosque, built in 1594-95 as a donation by Hadum Sylejman Efendia (known as Hadum Aga), who simultaneously donated funds for other public facilities in the town, including some of the first shops in the old marketplace.

Gjakova is mentioned as a city for the first time in 1662, by the Ottoman Turkish traveler Evliya Çelebi, who described it as a flourishing and attractive town consisting of 2,000 houses, all built of stone with roofs and gardens. Public buildings were suited on a broad plain and included two richly adorned Congregational mosques, several prayer-houses, some khans with leaden roofs, a delightful bathhouse, and about 300 shops like nightingale-nests.

The forms of denominating the city had changed during the centuries. The oldest form "Jakova" originates from the base "Jak" anthroponym dispersed among vendor Albanians and the Ottoman suffix "ovasi" that means a field. Therefore, "Jak ovasi" means Jak’s field, because Jak Vula, according to the tradition, allowed Hadum Aga to build the mosque and the above-mentioned objects with the condition that the city to be built would carry his name.

== Religion ==
In the 16th century there were only 13 Islamic families, out of 68 families that lived in Gjakova.
According to the demographic statistics of 2011, the prominent religion is Islam, including 81,75% of the population, while 17,23% is Christian, 0.02% Orthodox and 1% other.
This is a result of the process of Islamization that occurred during the Ottoman Rule. Most Catholics live in the "Rruga e Katolikëve" street, where the two main churches are, and others in villages. The Muslims, living in other parts of the city and in most villages, have been encouraging the building of mosques, which could have counted about 10-15 buildings during the centuries. The religious monuments enrich the cultural heritage of Gjakova.

== Cultural Heritage Monuments ==
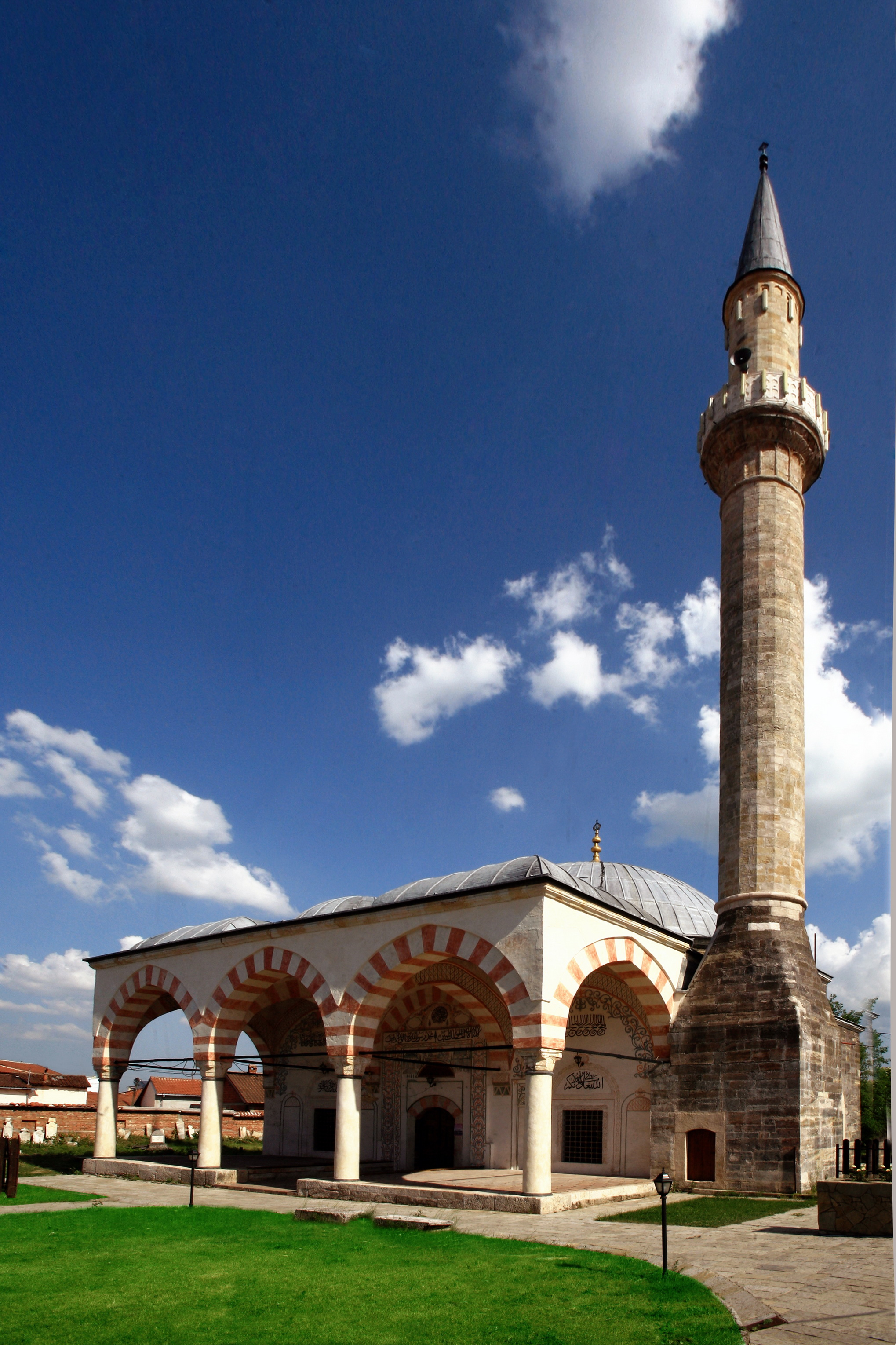
Hadum Mosque

Gjakova is very rich regarding to the monuments of cultural heritage. Most of them are religious monuments, but Gjakova is also known for some other interesting monuments, such as: stone houses (kulla), strong stone bridges and Old Bazaar, as an urban, architectural and traditional handicrafts entirety.

The historical monuments in Gjakova, western Kosovo, are divided into three main categories based on their cultural, religious, and social context. In 1574, the Hadum Mosque was built on Jak Vula's property, laying the foundation of the city. The core part of the town was created between the Krena River to the east and Cabrati hill to the west. Around the cornerstone of the town, the Old Bazaar, the center of trade and craftsmanship, was created. By 1900, the bazaar housed around 1,000 businesses. Numerous bridges were built to enable trade caravans to cross the neighboring rivers. With the fast development of trade in the city, several inns were built to host visitors. Because of its ancient origins, and rapid economic development, Gjakova is of historical importance.

=== Mosques ===
Gjakova, as a town with Islamic main religious orientation, is characterized with a large number of mosques and Tekkes. One of the most important mosque is The Hadum Mosque while there are also some others, such as: The Kusar Mosque and The Mahmut Pasha Mosque.

- The Hadum Mosque was built by Sylejman Hadum Aga in 1594-95, thus becoming the first mosque in Gjakova. The complex of the Hadum Mosque represents a cultural, educational and religious center of this area. It used to be comprised from a madrasah, a library and shops that were destroyed during the 1999 Kosovo War. Comprising a main prayer hall, ornate vestibule and minaret, the mosque is famous for its colorful interior and exterior. Its decorations display examples of the Islamic Albanian baroque style, used in the 19th century.

=== Churches ===
Gjakova is also characterized with two main catholic churches, which are part of the cultural heritage. These are:

- The Saint Ndou (Anton) Church
- Saint Paul and Saint Peter Church

==== Church of St. Anthony of Padua ====
The Church of St. Anthony of Padua ("Ndou") was built in 1931, located in the Catholic neighborhood, next to the Saint Pal Church and Saint Pjeter Church in Gjakova. It was previously called the Patter Mila church (Emilio a Cless), built in 1882, but later this church was totally destroyed. In 1931, Pater Lorenc Mazreku built the new church in the same location as the old church. It was renovated several times with the addition of dormitories, offices, and toilets, but it carefully preserved the concept, and architectural importance, of catholic churches. The Saint Ndou Church, being one of the oldest sacred buildings in Gjakovë, is an important architectural site in the city. During the Kosovo War in 1999 the church was subject to major damage done by Yugoslav Serb soldiers.

=== Tekkes ===
Most of the Tekkes belong to the Islamic Sufi Tarikat/orders like Rifai, Saadi, etc. There are many tekkes, while some are very interesting and unique in architectural concepts and their roles during history.
The Big Autochepalous Balcanic Tekke is the oldest tekke of Saadi Tarikat in the whole Rumelia, dating from the origin of Gjakova town. Other important tekkes are:

- The Shejh Emin Tekke
- The Shejh Ban Tekke
- The Shejh Danjoll Tekke
- The Bektashi Tekke
- The Tekke of Baba Ali

==== Sheikh Emin's Tekke ====
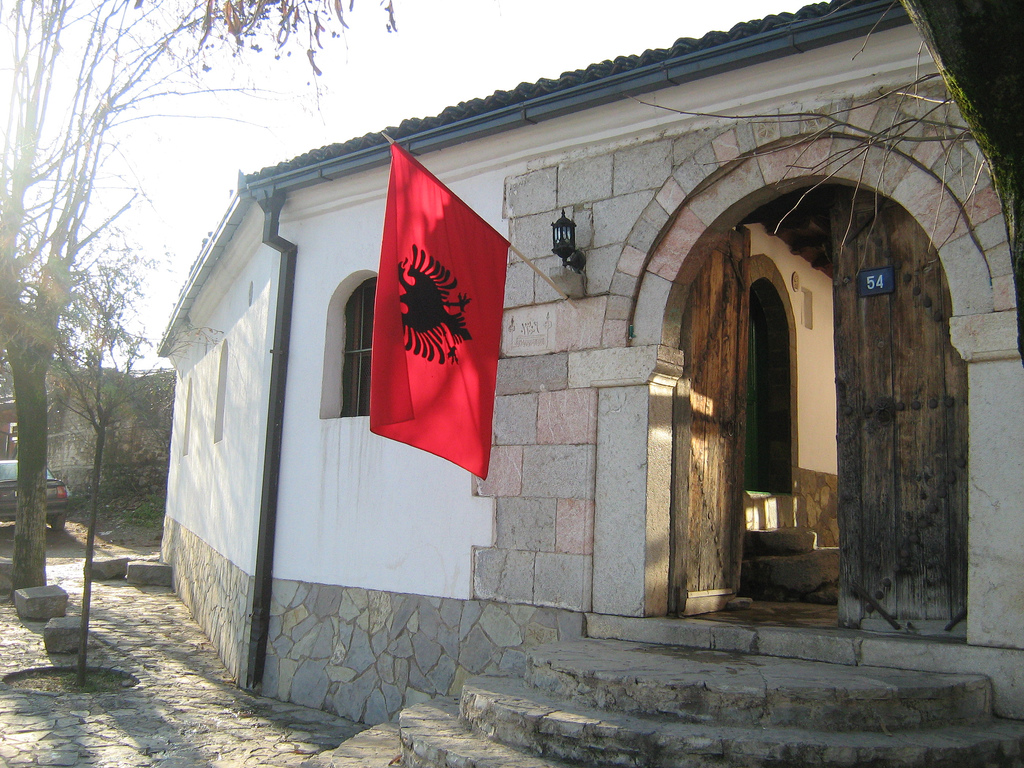
Sheikh Emin's Tekke

Sheikh Emin's Tekke (Khanqah) was built in 1730 by Sheikh Emin, a famous architect who created many important architectural complexes in Gjakove. It belongs to the Sufi Muslim order (Sufism), specifically, Sad Tariqa. It is one of many religious monuments that represent the folk architecture in Gjakova. The whole complex with its "tyrbes" (small mausoleums), the ritual prayer halls called "samahanes", houses, and fountains make this Tekke a monumental religious building. It is characterized by a detailed sacral architecture, with its wood carved elements that show the centuries of cultural values hidden behind this Tekke. As such it has been protected by law since 1956. This monument is often referred to as a model when analyzing other architectural monuments with this form.

==== Bektashi Tekke ====
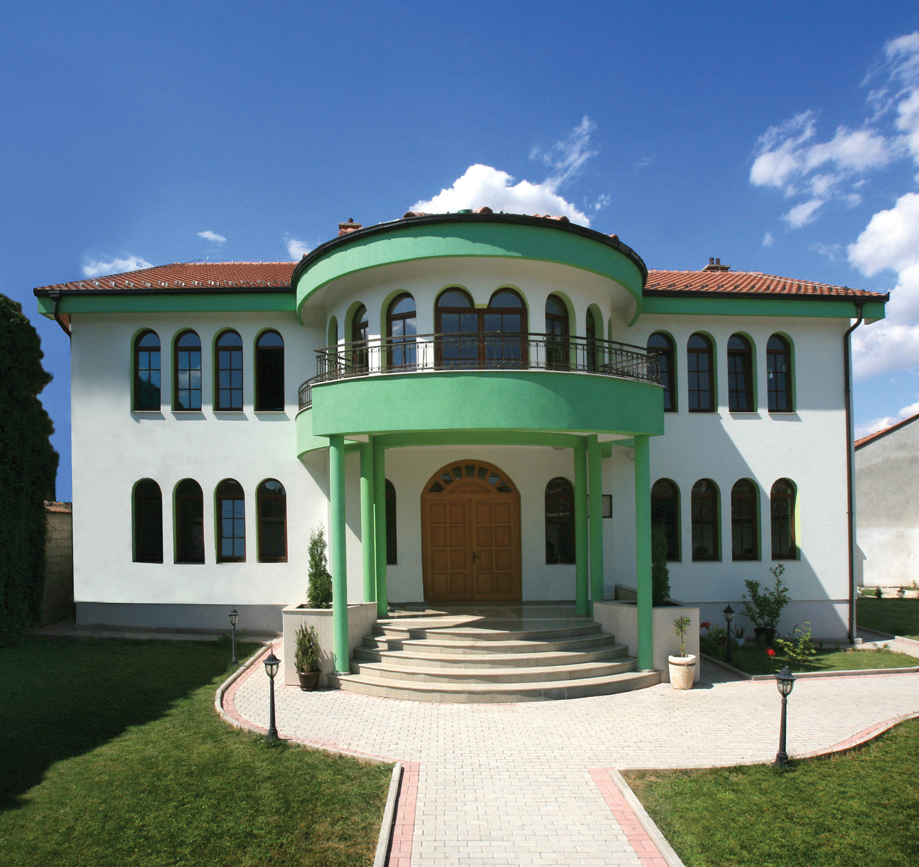
The Bektashi Tekke

The Bektashi Tekke was built in 1790 at the heart of the Big Bazaar complex in Gjakove. Being the first of its kind, this Tekke represented the Tarikat Bektashi. According to legend, the Tarikat Bekatshi was created by Haxhi Bektash Veliu in Anadolu during the thirteenth century. As the Ottoman Empire started to expand, a mission of this Muslim sect arrived from Anadolu in Balkans, Crete, and Greece. In Gjakova, the Bektashi Tekke was destroyed by the Serbian military forces during the Kosovo War in 1999. Thousands of books, including fifty-eight manuscripts, were burned, as the whole structure was destroyed. The Bektashi Tekke was reconstructed between 2004 and 2006 so that believers would be able to perform their spiritual rituals. It is characterized by the ringing bell, by the courtyard door, which announces another crowd of visitors who share the same Muslim belief has arrived. The graves of seven out of nine Bektashi fathers who served here from the seventeenth century are located in the right temple of the Tekke, while two others were buried in Turkey. These seven graves are considered to be sacred, meaning that they give direction to people to find the path towards God and they help people challenge their difficulties in life. The Bektashi carry their own specific Islamic ideas, indicating the diversity of beliefs in Kosovo and the prevalence of the religious tolerance.

==== Grand Tekke ====
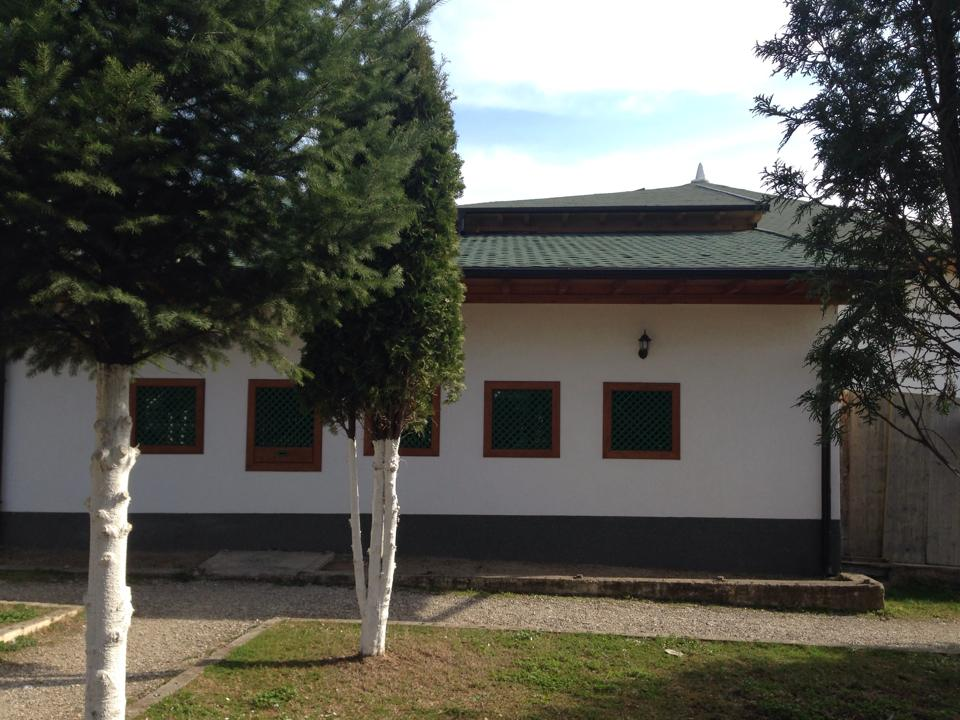
The Grand Tekke

The Grand Tekke, is located close to the Big Bazaar, next to the Clock Tower (Albanian: Sahat Kulla). It was built in the seventeenth century and remains the oldest tekke of the Saad Tarikat (a local tribe of the Muslim sect) in the entire Rumelia (the old Ballkan). It was established by Sheikh Sulejman Axhiza Baba in 1582, with the origin from the Bushati family in Shkodër, Albania (Bushatlinjet). Sheikh Sulejman lived in Gjakova together with his three sons for a few years. One of his sons, Danjoll Efendiu, followed in his footsteps by becoming the first imam in the Hadumi Mosque in Gjakova. After a while, Sheikh Sulejman, along with his third son, moved to Prizren, the closest city to Gjakova and built the Saad Tekke in Marash, the center of the town. A focal point of the whole of the Grand Tekke is the shrine "tyrbe" where the saints are buried. There are also the so-called "samahanes" where people perform their religious practices, and the residential section where the family and its members, who take care of the Tekke, live.

=== Bridges ===
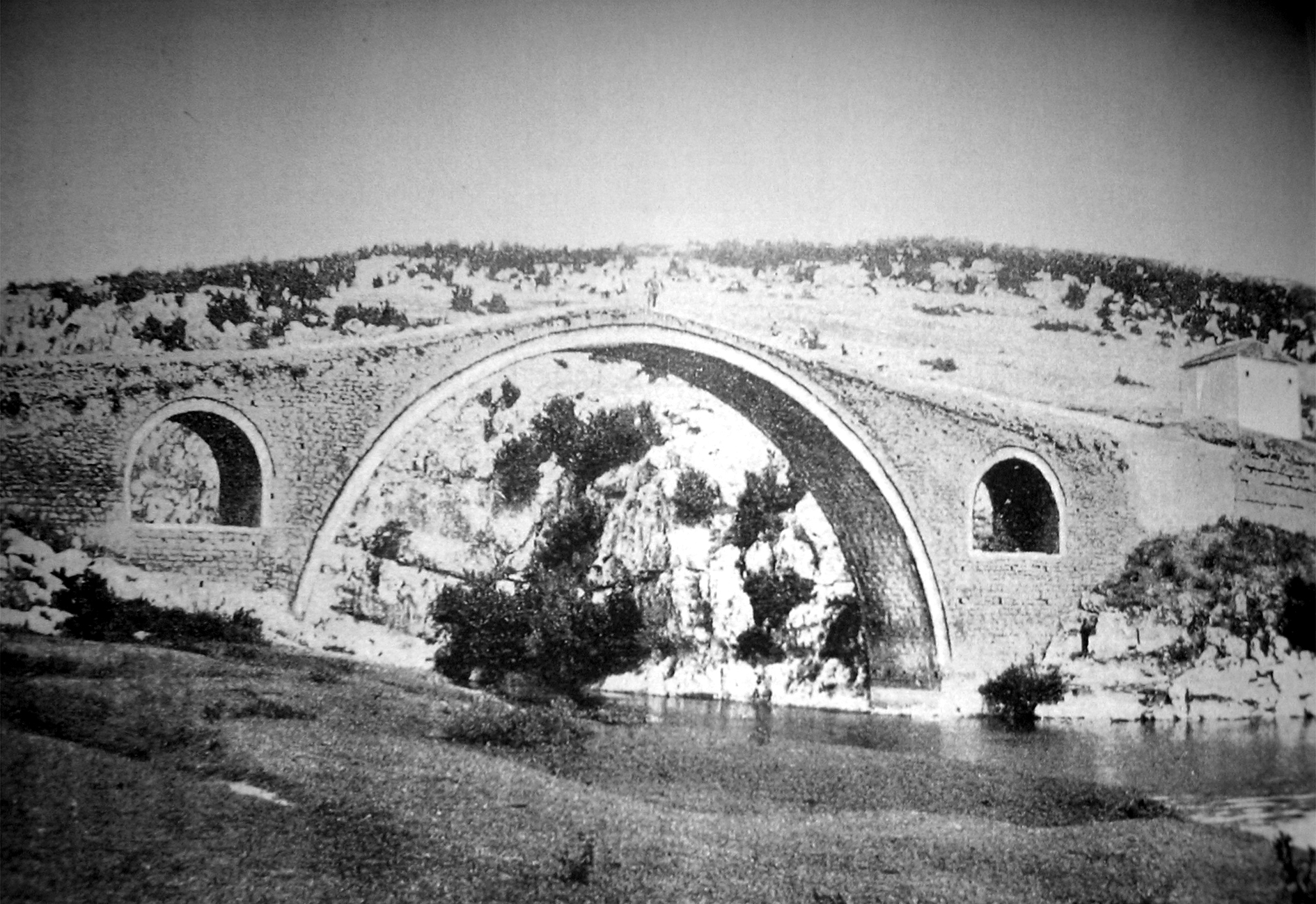
The 'Fshejt' Bridge - Old picture

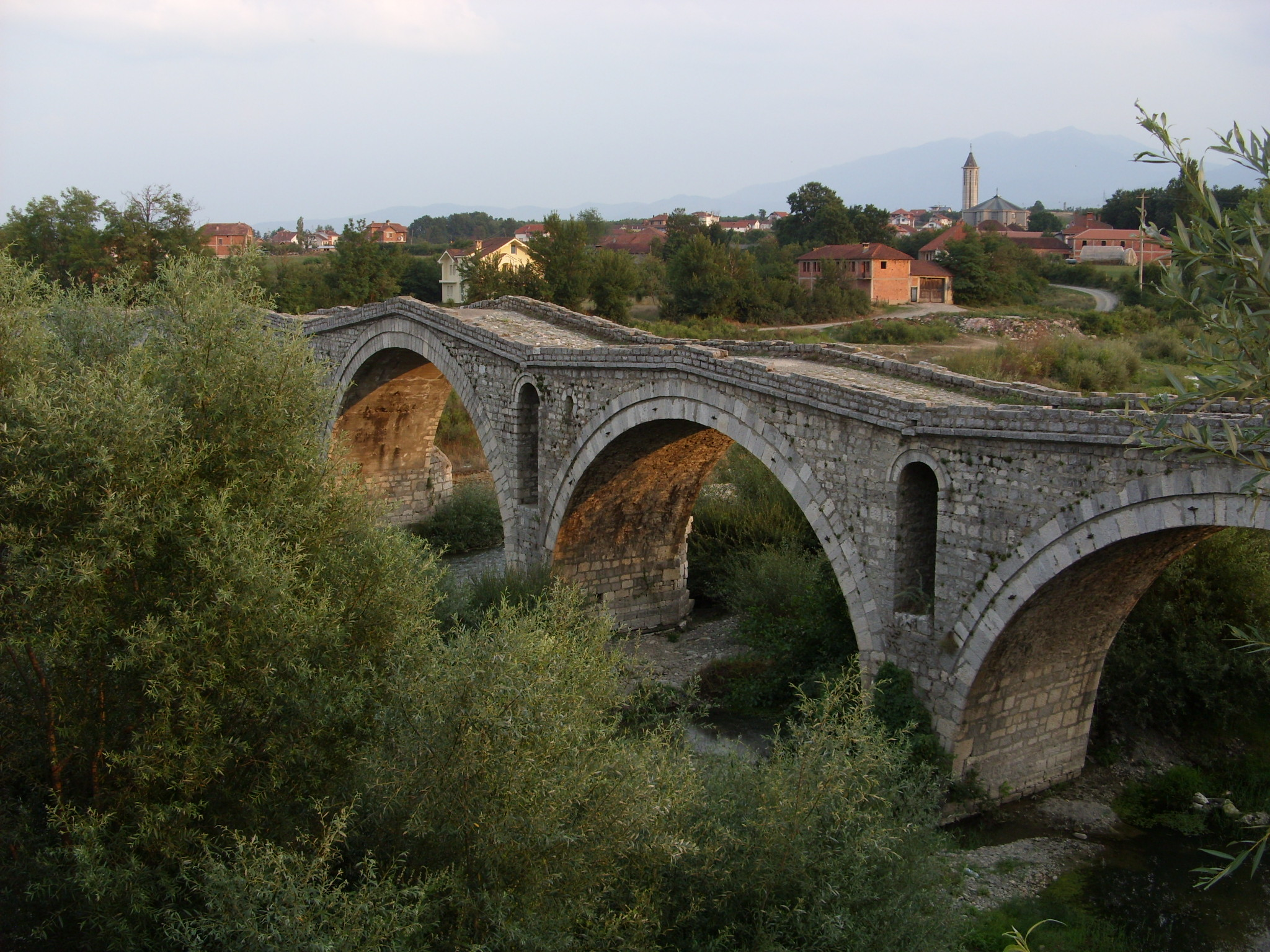
Terezive Bridge

Gjakova has many bridges which were built to connect the city with other developed areas, such as Prizren, Vushtrri and Shkodra, and simultaneously facilitating the journey of the Caravans. The bridges were mostly built by the esnaf of Gjakova, who played the main role on the economic development of that time.

The most notable bridges are:

- Terzijski Bridge is a famous stone bridge built across the Erenik river 1730. It served as a means for Gjakova’s esnafs/terezis (artisans) to go between Gjakova and Prizren. It consists of eleven arches in half-arch shapes and ten discharging windows between them. It is 192.8 meters long and 5.1m wide. The bridge is under protection since 1962, for its historical, sociological, artistic, urban, and cultural value.
- Tabaket Bridge spans the river Erenik. Built by the Esnaf of Gjakova in 1771, it served as a link between Gjakova and Shkodra, two famous trading cities at the time. It is a 127m long construction consisting of 14 lintel windows with discharges and carved reliefs. A scissors-like figure (the working tool of the craftsman who built the bridge), a hand palm with fingers, and a rosette with a small sphere and radius within is carved in one of the archways of the bridge. It has also been under protection since 1962.
- Taliqi Bridge is built on the River Krena and connects the older part of the city on the west, with the newest, on the east. The bridge is over 21.50m long, 4.05m wide and has a height of 5.0m. Earlier there were three backed vaults in its structure with two discharging windows, and later it had two large arches and two columns. It consisted of 7m length of wooden construction. The decision in 1962 on its protection reports that it too has historical, sociological, artistic, urban, and cultural value.
- The Fshajt Bridge is a stone bridge with one arch over the Canyon of the river Drini I Bardhe on the way from Gjakova to Prizren. The bridge is 18.50m high, 7m wide, and 37m long. During the First World War it was destroyed completely, but in 1942 was rebuilt. In the war of 1999 it was damaged again, and was restored by the Italian Kosovo Force (KFOR). Both the bridge and the canyon have been legally protected since 1986.
- The Islam Begu Bridge

Many of these bridges dating back to the 18th century, are still used, and represent historical, sociological, urban, artistic and cultural values.

=== Clock Tower ===
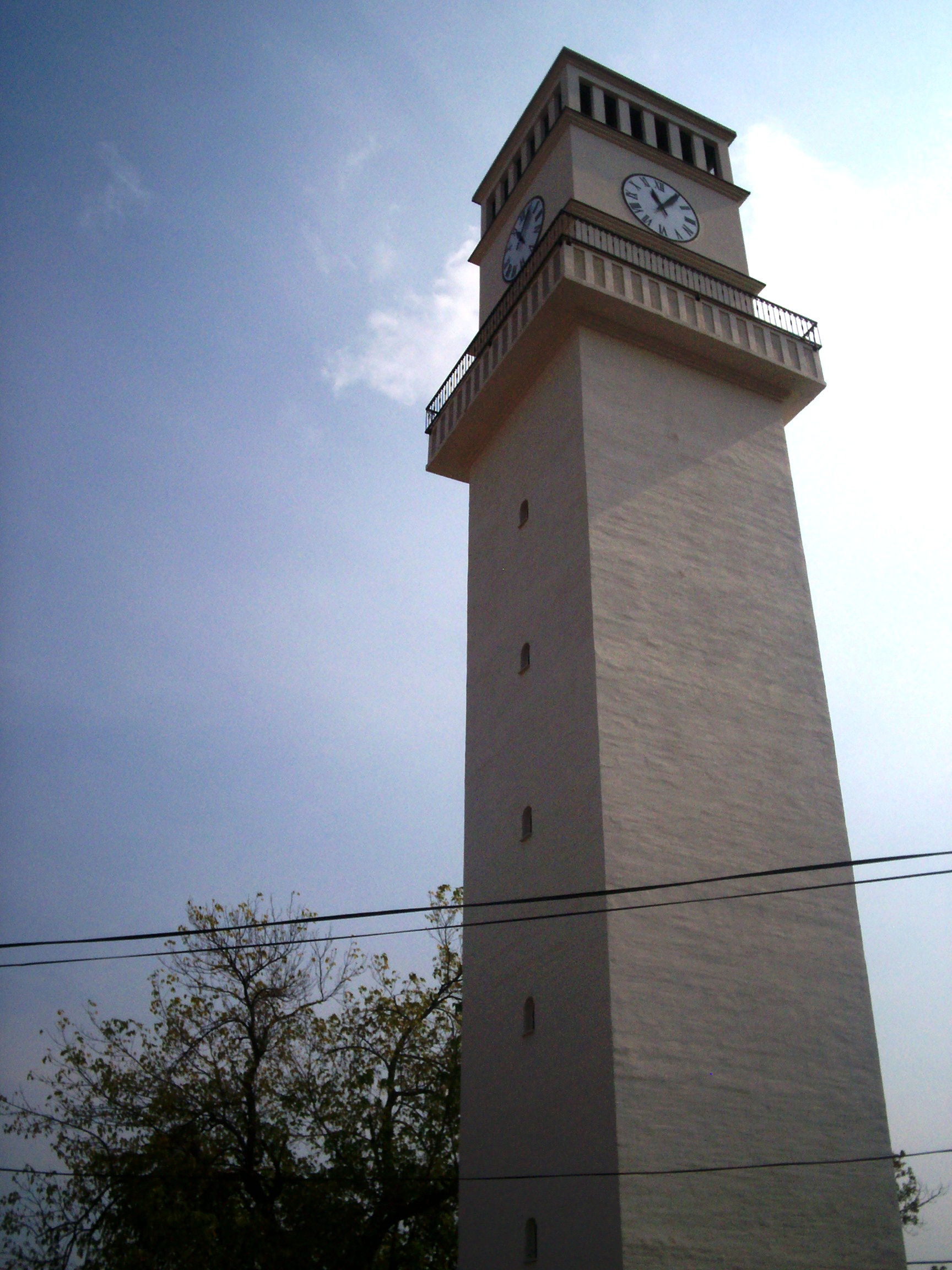
The Clock Tower

Clock Tower (Sahat Kulla) was built in the year 1597 (just after The Hadum Mosque) at a place known as "Field of the Clock" (Clock Valley, near the Grand Bazaar), characterizes the rapid economic development of Gjakova at that time. In 1912, the tower was burned by Montenegrin military forces (part of the Balkan Wars), while the belfry was removed and transported to Montenegro. With sides 4.10m long and a height of about 30 meters, a new clock tower was built later near the foundations of the previous one. Constructed mainly of stone with the wooden observation area and the roof covered in lead, the clock tower is unique of its kind.

=== The Haraqia Inn (Hani i Haraçisë) ===
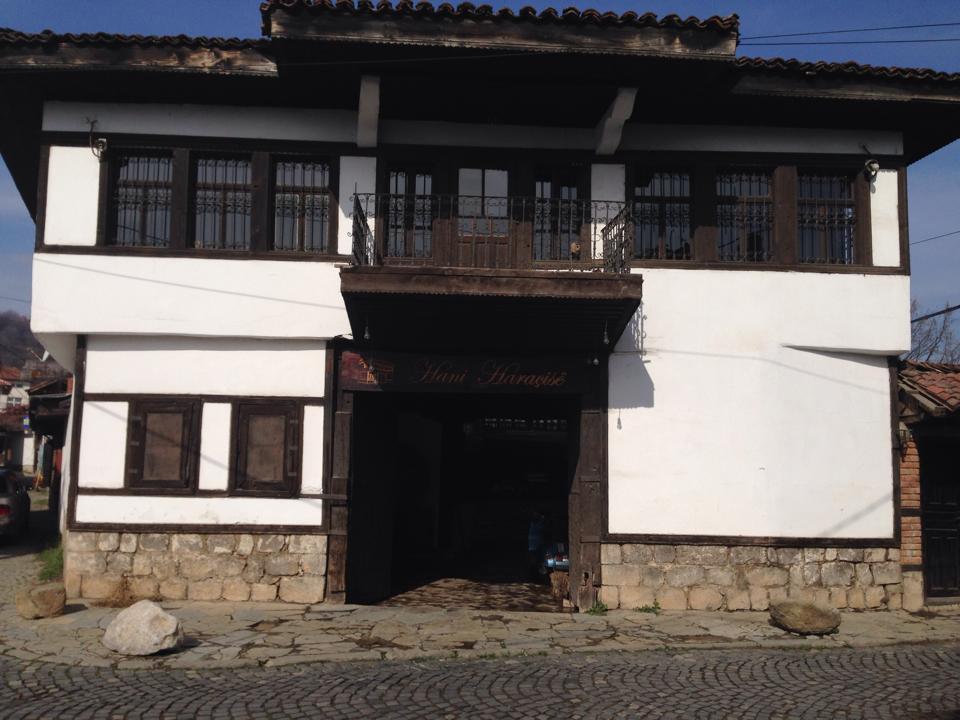
Haraqija Inn

Dating from the 16th century, the Haraqija Inn (Haraçia Inn) is one of the oldest objects in Gjakova, which history is linked with the origin of the city. Being used by many different passing caravans, the inn is situated in the southern part of the Bazaar. Characteristic wooden construction style, with a beautiful "çardak", two floors and a wonderful yard, it has almost saved the original shape. The second floor had several single-rooms, where people of caravans, mostly from Shkodër, who used to travel and trade to Venedik, used to pass the night in. There are many elements that reminds old times, and it is a good enjoyment, especially for them who like oriental style. Nowadays the Haraçia Inn is exploited as a museum-restaurant, where people can be served with traditional foods.

During the 1870s and 1880s, 16 inns were built in Gjakova. In 1835, Ami Beau wrote about the beauty of the Inns of Haraqia and of Islam Aga. Miller, in 1838, mentioned the big caravanserai which hosted around 100 guests and their transport animals. The Caravanserai had big halls of Armenian seraphs. One of the most famous inns that still exist nowadays is the Haraqija Inn, located near the Hadumi mosque. The inn still serves as a restaurant and can host around a hundred people. The Haraqija Inn is made up of two parts: "the old inn" in the west, and "the new inn" in the east. The old inn is believed to have been built just after the construction of the Hadumi mosque, whereas the new inn was built in 1901. The old inn consists of two floors, the ground floor, which is constructed with stones, and the first floor that is constructed with bricks and attic. All the ceilings are decorated with carved wood. Likewise, the new inn consists of the ground floor and first floor constructed with bricks. Even today, The new inn still maintains its traditional style.

== Old Bazaar (Çarshia e Vjetër) ==
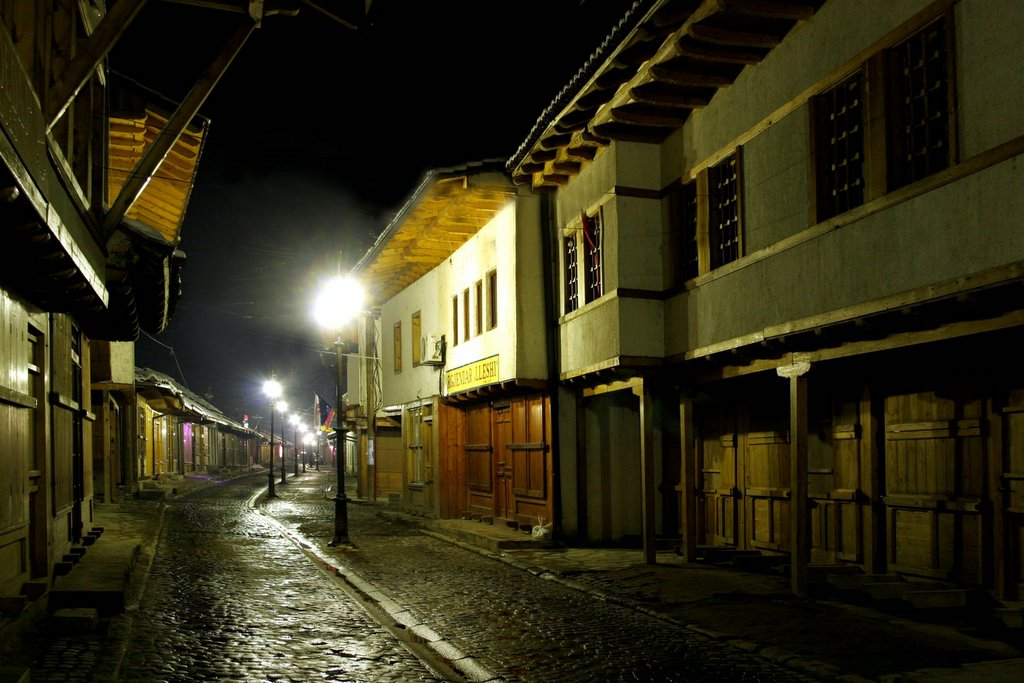
Gjakova Old Bazaar

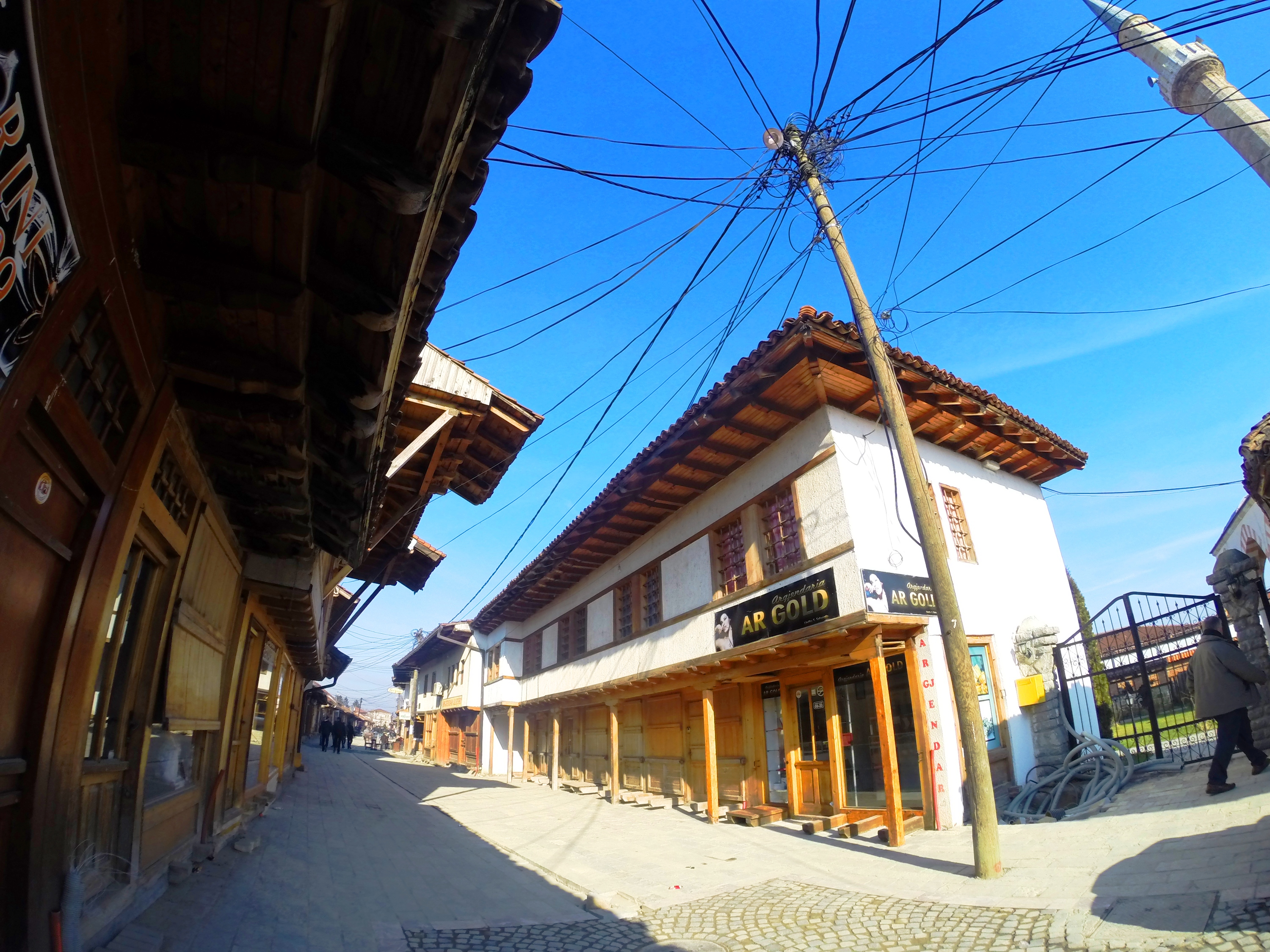
Grand Bazaar Today

The Old Bazaar of Gjakova (from the Turkish: Çarşı meaning marketplace Albanian: Çarshia e Vjetër; also known as Çarshia e Madhe - Grand Bazaar) This cordial market with small wooden shops since the 16th century, if not earlier, has been a center of craftsmen and handicrafts-men of different artisans. The Old Bazaar was considered as one of original bazaars in Albania, which together with the Small Bazaar, Wood Square, Grain Square, Animal Square (livestock market), etc. composed the most important object of Gjakova Market. Although divided from the Krena River, the two bazaars (the old and the small one) used to be linked with a good system of bridges, lighted by head lights, creating the unitary and making the Old Bazaar as one of the largest and qualified markets in Albania. This market of a great economic value for the city of Gjakova was burnt to the ground during the 1999 war, but afterwards it was rebuilt in the same style and today it has been revived. The Old Bazaar is one of the most unusual oriental monuments in Kosovo and abroad.

It contains around 525 important buildings., covering an area of about 34,000 m^{2}, with its north to south scope reaching 1,000 m.

=== History of Old Bazaar ===
Established with the appearance of the first craftsmen and the manufacture production craft-work, when Gjakova won the status "kasaba" in 1594/95, the Old Bazaar represents a priceless value of cultural and social development of Gjakova. For the maintenance of the objects built by Selman Hadim Aga, such the mosque, the "mejtep" (religious elementary school), the "muvakihane" (a building which measures time and defines the calendar based on astrolabic quadrates), the library, the "hamam" (public bath), the inn and the shops, the Sultan was requested to add to his "vakëf" some land from the sultanate.

Being visited in 1662, Gjakova is first and right interpreted for the Old Bazaar, from the Turkish traveler, Evliya Çelebi, who was amazed with the large number of shops, buildings and craft-work.

The most famous craftsman and artisans were gunsmiths, silversmiths, tinsmiths, copper dishes producers, tailors (terezis), tanners (tabaks), embroiderers, bookbinders, musical instruments makers, pipe-makers, and carpenters. The different types of craftsmanship were a huge influential contributor to the cultural, social and economic development of the region of Gjakova.

It has been under protection of the law since 1995.

=== Urban Entirety of Old Bazaar ===
The Old Bazaar is the most special characteristic Gjakova has. With an oriental structure of crooked roads, which spontaneously link different neighborhoods, it inspires each architect. From the center of the city, through the Islam Begu Bridge, can be reached in less than five minutes. It includes a space from about 35,000 m^{2}, with the main road, which is longer than 1 km. In architectonic view, it represents an interesting structure of the most beautiful models of the traditional architecture and the building skills starting from the tiniest details till the large complex of buildings, objects, environments and urbanism, always keeping the greatness in each detail. The architect who projected the Old Bazaar, had a giant creative force, making it a symbol of traditional life of Gjakova people.

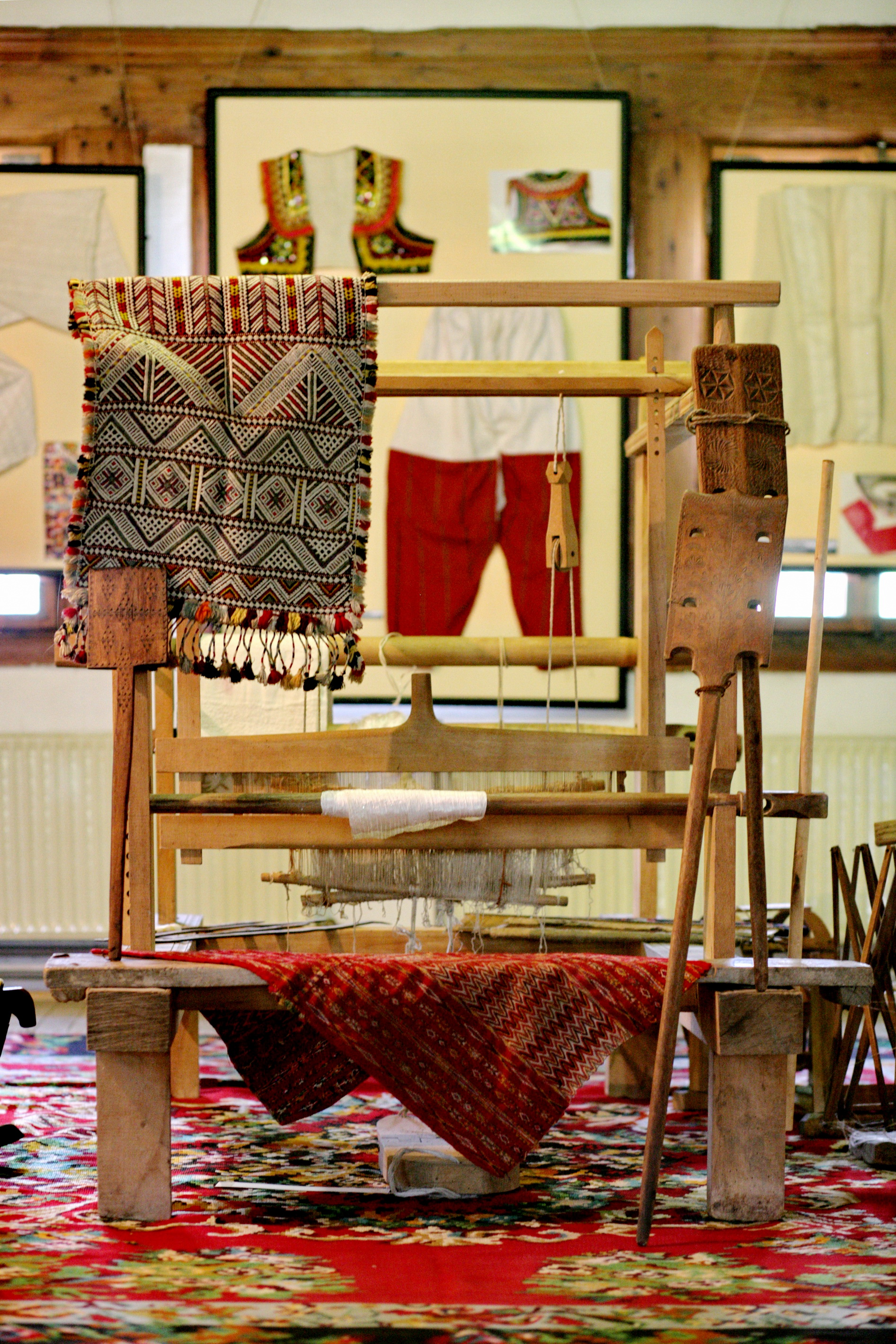
Artisanwork

=== Handicraft tradition ===
Since being connected with developed places of that time, such Shkodra, Dubrovnik, Venedik, Serbia, Montenegro, Bulgaria, Macedonia, Egypt, Austria, etc., Gjakova was developed rapidly. As center for this development was the Old Bazaar, which lied mainly round the Hadum Mosque, between the Çabrati Hill and Krena River. The Old Bazaar in the 19th century, had 1250 shops of different handicrafts, which drove the development of inside and abroad trade. Even in the Old Bazaar of Gjakova, the trade day used to long three days, and some time used to be organized twice a week. According to an old Byzantine tradition, which had a fluent development during the Ottoman Empire rule, each kind of handicraft or trade had its own road or square. While in eastern part of the Old Bazaar were assembled silk-workers, embroidery craftsmen, push button called "sumbulla" workers, in the opposite side toward the south, were grouped clock workers and silversmiths. Near the Hadum Mosque were centered the manufacture with many shops, while at various points of the Old Bazaar were placed other crafts such as: woolen white hat craftsmen, quilt workers, leather processors, blade workers, gunsmiths, rug workers, tailors, saddlers, caldron workers, bakers and butchers. The Old Bazaar has a big cultural, social and historical value for the science, because through studying it, can be known the traditional and social life in Gjakova. This expresses a true museum, with the diversity of different handicrafts, some of have remained as part of spiritual heritage.

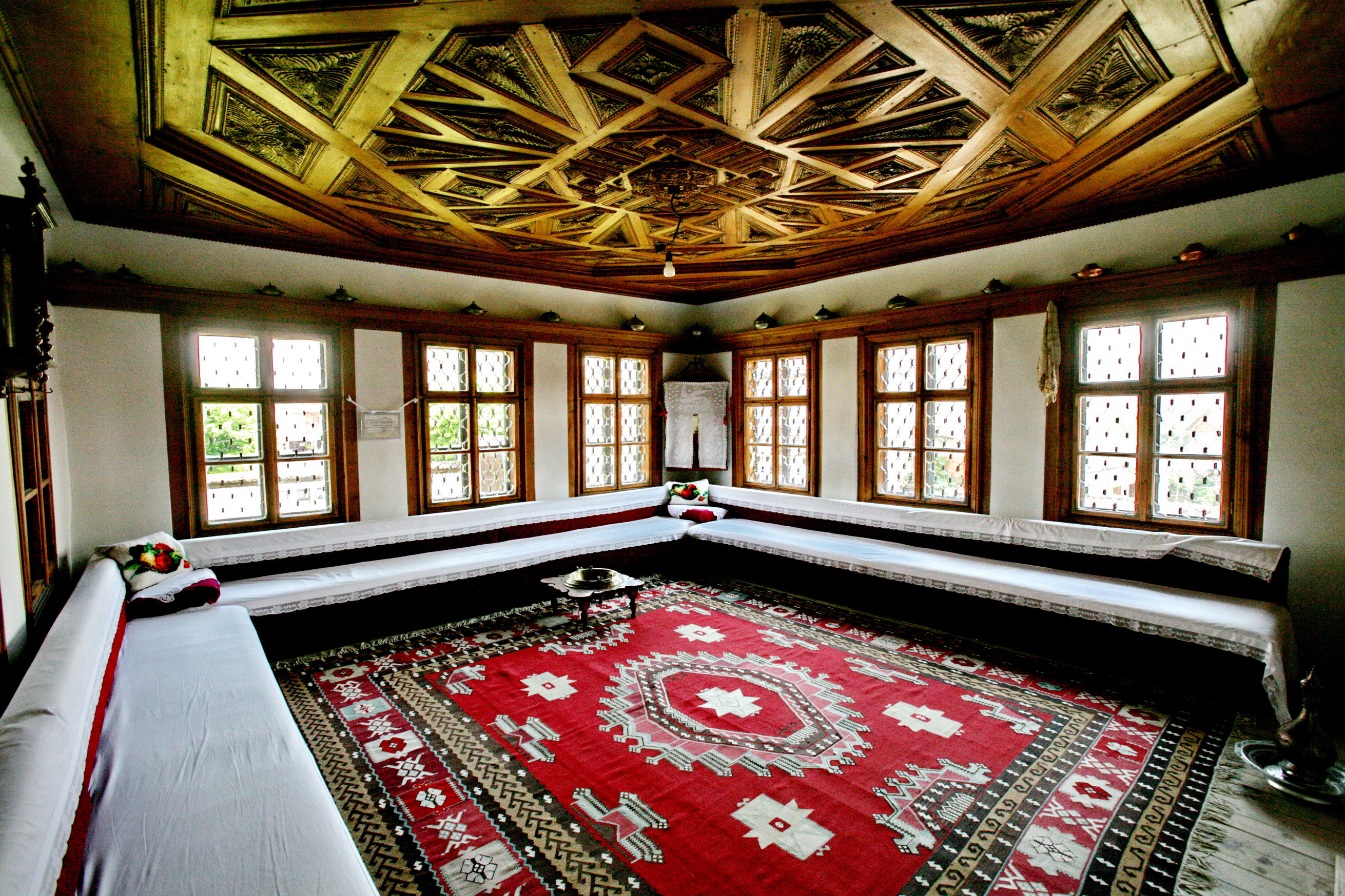
A traditional house

=== Traditional city houses ===
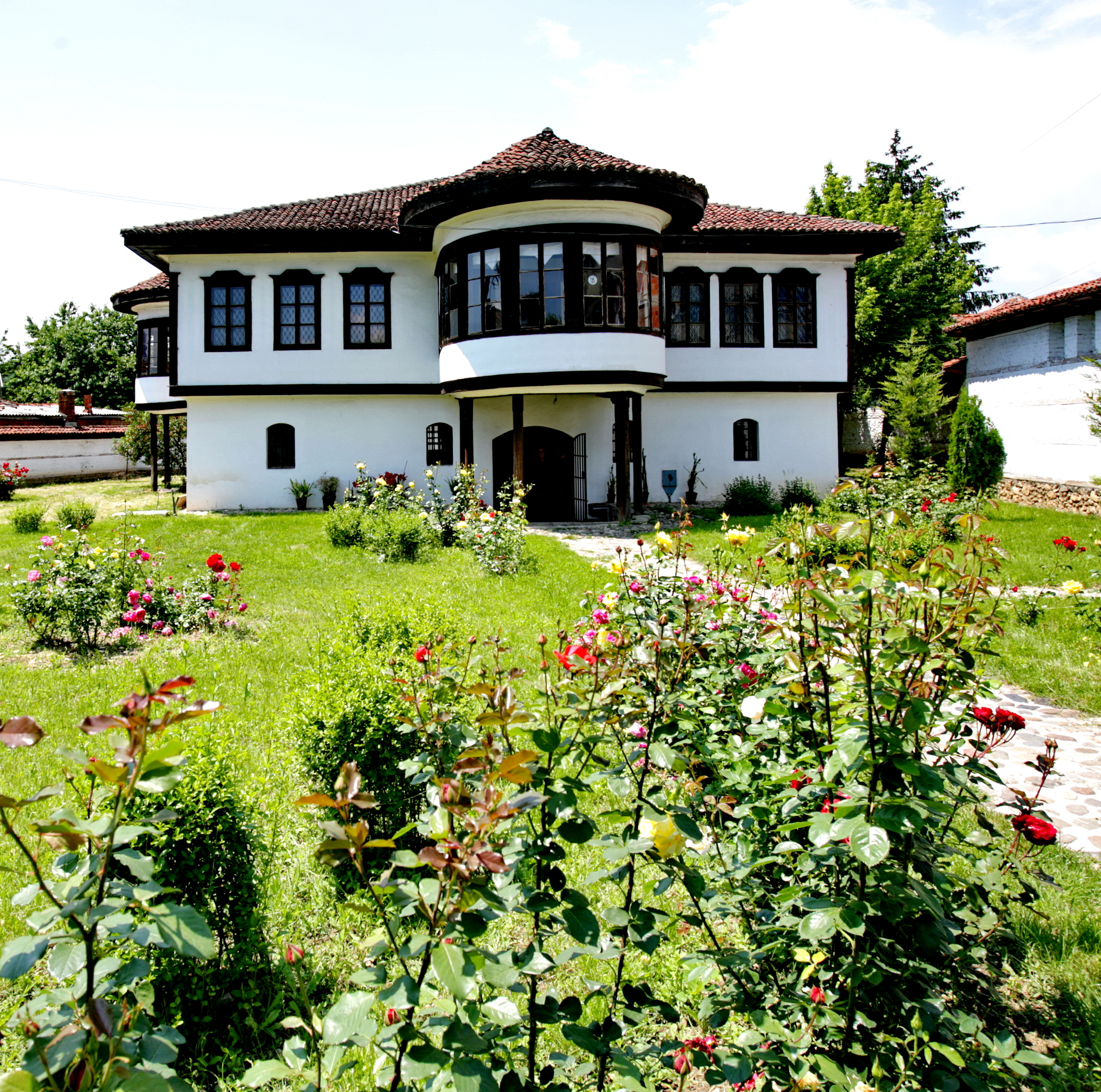
Ethnographic Museum

Traditional city houses, used to have near the yard entering doors, a kind of guest-house, composed from the room of familiar and unfamiliar, with separated baths and toilettes, the stable for placing the carrying animals and hayloft above it for keeping the food for animals, than the wheat garner, corn, basket, etc. At this side of the house the guests were sited that did not manage to finish all the works during the market day, which sometimes, when the bazaar reached the peak of its development, lasted up to three days. The most famous city houses are:

- Sylejman Vokshi House is located at the entrance of Grand Bazaar in an area called "Mejtepie Ruzhdije". The tower was built in the first half of the eighteenth century. It has great historical value because Sylejman Vokshi, a popular hero, was born there. Sylejman Vokshi was mostly distinguished for his involvement in the Albanian National Movement. He was an initiator of the Prizren National League (September 1878), a political and military leader, member of the central committee, head of the financial commission of that league, and head of the Albanian League in Gjakova. This tower was protected by law in 1980 and has architectural value since it is built with bricks, natural stones, and mortar limestone. The building has undergone some slight changes, especially in the inner part.
- Abdullah Pashë Dreni House, built in 1790, is a three-floor building in the shape of a tower, which served as a private house and a fortress. It was built out of stone and bricks and it has small windows. Nowadays, the first floor cannot be seen from the outside due to the increase in level of the main road which connects two parts of the city through the Islam Beg Bridge. Apart from its architectural value, this building also has historical significance. When Marshall Mehmet Ali Pasha visited Gjakova in order to oversee the cession of that region to the Principality of Montenegro, he was killed along with many Ottoman soldiers in this house.
- The house of Rexhep Haxhi Ismaili: The Ethnographic Museum was built in 1830. Initially it was the house of Rexhep Haxhi Islami, whose high status as a citizen was represented by his living in a corner dwelling. The house has two floors with interesting corners and a unique heating system. The ceiling of the house is decorated with carved wood. It has been under legal protection since 1955.
- The house of Hasan Polloshka
- The stone house 'kulla' of Mustafa Vokshi
- The house 'kulla' of Hysni Koshi

== Handcrafts ==
- Production of arms - Gunsmiths

Metal manufacturing included several important craftsmen such as gunsmiths, silversmiths, production of copper dishes, tinsmiths, etc. During the 18th century in Gjakova, a renowned gunsmith, Tush Dyfektxhija (rifle), managed to create "the popular school" of this workmanship, still known with the same name. Tush was considered as the most talented master for producing and ornamenting the "celinas" (A gun named after a kind of snake, given that the head-handle was in the shape of a snake). Long weapons crafted in Gjakova, ornamented with gold and silver elements, decorated "in the Albanian way", became famous all over Europe from the 18th century. These and other models were also sold abroad in other markets such as Venice, Austria, Greece, etc.

- Silversmiths

Gjakovar craftsmen were also known as silversmiths. Gjakova, Peja and Prizren are well-known silversmiths regarding their work of filigree and carving. The black and white metal combination, crafting method, was called as "Gjakova style" that differed from the "Prizren and Pehja style" (filigree and grain respectively). This style of craftsmanship was used in the production of rings, tobacco cases/boxes, tobacco pipes, etc. Up until now the method of this style was kept secret by gjakovars.

The artistic work of silversmiths were praised not only from the native population but also from the foreign countries that made them famous.

From the products for personal decoration of Gjakovar silversmiths we can mention: rings, earnings, bracelets, tasfes (bowl-shape decorative hats for women), etc. that were utilized from the richest families of the country and also exported to Istanbul.

- Tailors ("Terzinjtë")

The yearbook of the Prizren vilajet (manuscript) of the year 1874, mentions the vast number of tailors ("terzi"), Currier work ("tabak") and the embroidery work ("gajtanxhi/kazaz"). In Gjakova the tailors were divided in categories according to their society ranks. The first category i.e. worked for the richest ranks of the city with selected imported fabrics, which were sold with higher prices. Tailors worked costumes and outfits with high artistic values. The clothing was embroidered with silken, golden and silver threads. The work of national clothing for women and men that were ornamented with authentic elements had the advantage of tailoring products. "The esnaf" of gjakovar tailors was the most powerful leader and owned two-hundred shops, that were constantly working.

- Curriers ("Tabakët")

In Gjakova a vast number of various crafts were developed, feature this that can be supported by a great number of shops in "Çarshia e Madhe" (Old Bazaar), which according to a report given by Myller in 1838, "consisted of 1100 shops that almost all of them are filled with various goods". From this variety of crafts one can mention the Currier "tabakët" only, the producers of white and black leather.

Gjakova is a city rich with water sources that presented an important precondition for organizing the workshops for the Currier.

At the second half of the 19th century, in Gjakova there were sixty Currier workshop where large quantities of leather types such as soft "Saftjan" and durable "qoselea" were produced.

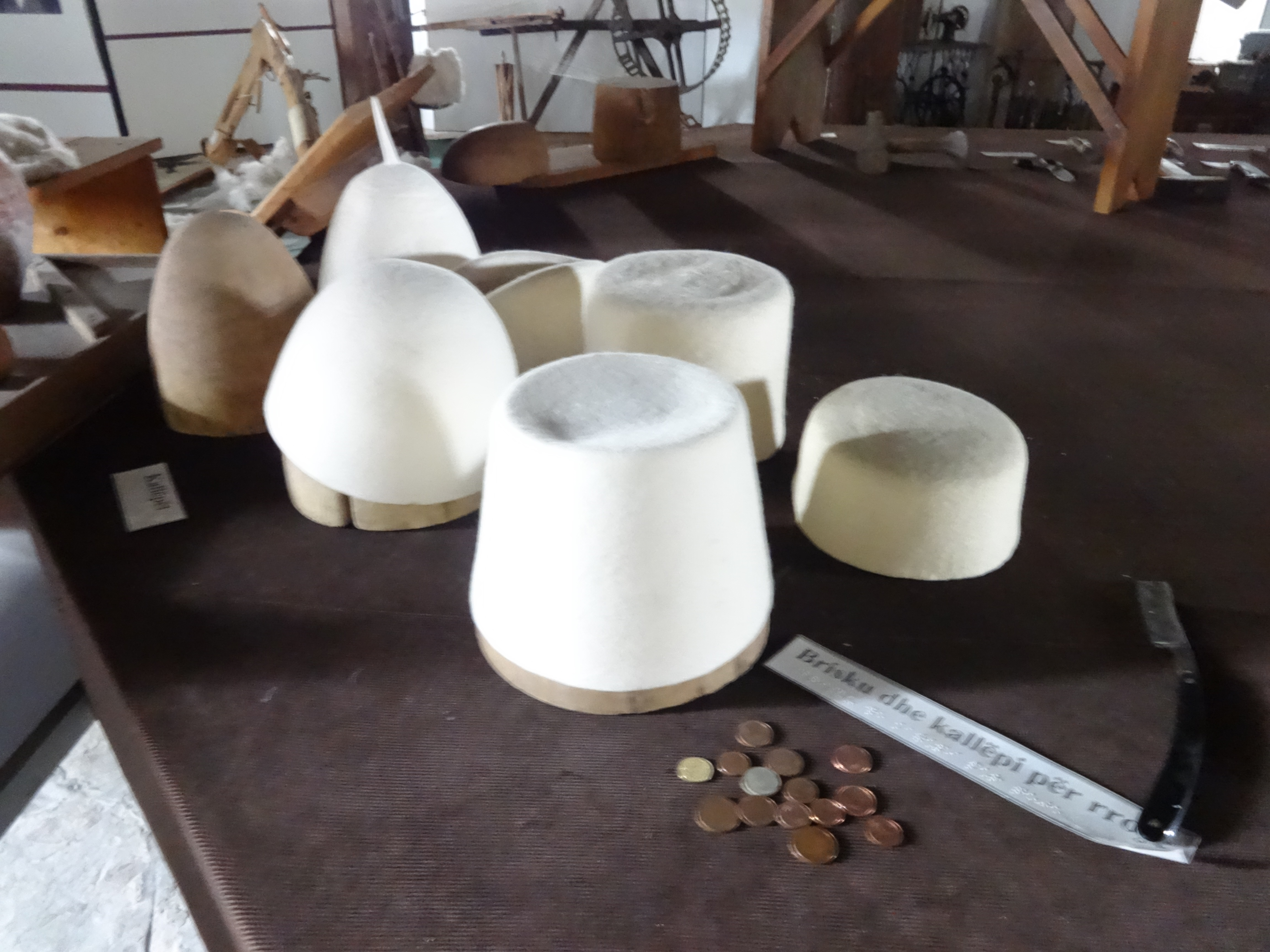
Woolen white hats

- Woolen white hat ("Qeleshe") craft

From the wool products, Gjakova was known for the white woolen hats, called "qeleshe". These craftsmen were very popular from the establishment of the Old Bazaar because these hats were an essential part of the Albanian national clothing. It is known that the type of white round cap similar to nowadays white hat called "plis" presents a part of our Illyrian ancestor's clothing. Albanians that took part in Kosovo War, in 1389, according to the fable, wore white round hats as current ones. Besides this, the type of cap that is called the Skanderbeg grave tells us the heritage of the Albanian "qeleshe". Gjakova was the only center of this craft where afterwards was disseminated to other Kosovo regions, such as in Northern Albania, Western Macedonia, in Sanxhak, etc.

There are various techniques for producing the "Qeleshe" woolen white hats. The oldest way, used until the end of the 19th century with one balding, was called "the gjakovar way", which differs from the more sophisticated methods of "Tirana way" with uses +two balding. The latter technique was later used in Gjakova as well. Gjakova Craftsmen Chamber before the Second World War had registered 16 shops that produces these hats, than afterwards in 1963 increased to 19 of them. This craft continues to exist.

- Wool and silk processing

From the 18th and especially in the 19th century, besides metal processing the craft of wool and silk processing went through as well. In the Old Bazaar of Gjakova were produced and sold in wholesale: felts, silken and woolen fabrics, woolen and silken lacing, etc. that were exported continuously to bigger quantities at the markets and fairs of the neighboring provinces of the Balkans, Mediterranean and those of the Central European Countries.

- Embroidery work ("Kazazët")

Another craft linked closely with the one of tailoring was the one of embroidery ("kazaz") that was characteristic for Gjakova's craftsmanship. Silk was also produced, which were used to make weaved fabrics linen and fine elegant shirts. Gjakova embroiders were very known for the quality of their luxury products that were sent to markets of Pristina, Skopje, Manastir, etc.

It is said that in Gjakova there were about 150 shops for silk and embroidery production.

- Cauldron work

From other crafts on metal processing, in Gjakova there was also developed the craft of cauldron-work, which developed enormously in the city center. Gjakovar cauldron-workers went all over to sell their products, competing successfully with other craftsmen of this workmanship.

- Carpenters

At the small side streets beyond the complex of Hadum Mosque crowded shops of many craftsmen were also located. Therefore, at the first side street beyond the mosque that today is called the case box workers street ("Rruga e kutixhinjëve"), there were many shops of woodworkers, which worked extraordinary decorative wood case boxes, cupboards, distaffs, ornamented jewelry boxes, coffee cases boxes, cradles and hammocks for children, kneading troughs, low round dining tables, school desks, folding chairs for reading, bookcase, stairs, etc.

- Saddlers

The leather production gave impetus also to the development of the craft of furrier (leather worker), craft of leather processing. The leather workers produced saddles as the most precious articles, ornamented with silver, colorful and metal decorations. In Shkodra, Gjakova and Manastir, according to Myller, saddles were produced, which differed from the others, because rear and front parts were more lifted. ref

The craft of the Currier and leather production contributed to development of another craft saddlers, the craftsmanship for processing the leather. Saddlers produced bags for tobacco and money, pushes, wallets, purses, arm belts, saddles, curbs, bits, girdles and other products necessary for equipping animal transport and loading. ref

The leather workers, same as tanners and slipper makers, used to sell their products locally and abroad. However, around the end of the 19th century the value of these crafts started to diminish.

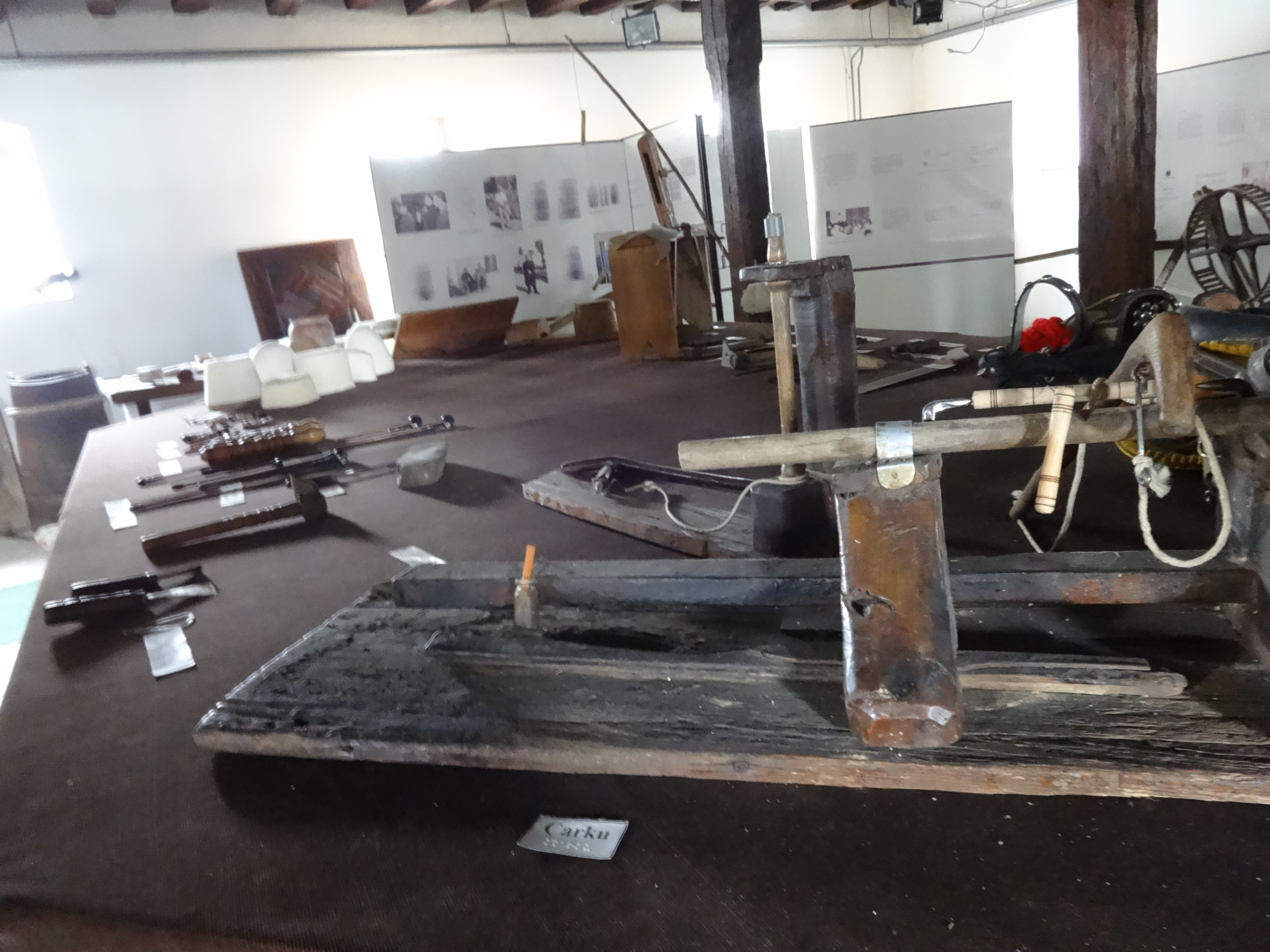
Pipe craft machine

- Tobacco pipe craft

Gjakova was known in all the Dukagjini Region more for the development of the tobacco pipe craft called "Çibukxhinjtë". This craft existed in Gjakova up to second half of the 20th century.

Tobacco pipe craftsmen worked on producing the tobacco pipes, jackets, calumets and various cutty pipes. The Dema brothers had their shops until the end of the 19th century, while the family of Zejnullah Ramadani, kept the shop until around 1958.

The raw material that was used for producing the tobacco pipes, jackets, calumets and various cutty pipes was wood and horns, different from what they used in the past such as ivory and bones.

In the past this craft was carried out also by silversmiths, who took care particularly of decoration of long pipes (chibouks, "çibuk") and weavers, who wove with silky gallons, parts of the smoking set.

- Bookbinders

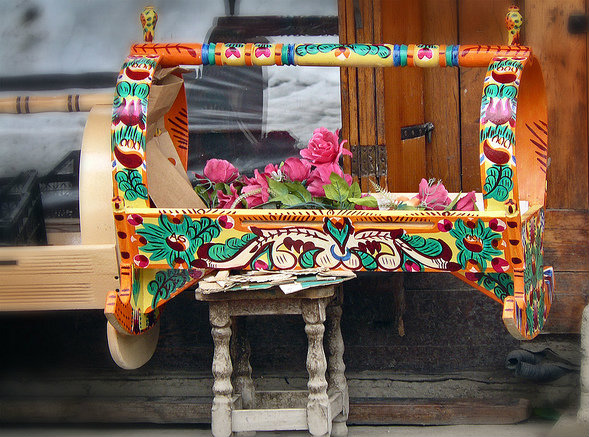
Cradle made in Gjakova

Another interesting craft, it seems, only for Gjakova, was the bookbinders craft (muxhelitët), who in their workshops, dealt with the binding of different books and manuscripts, with mending-repairing of old books damaged by long usage, or of any other physical damage and, above all, they dealt with copying of works of different authors, which they then distributed to libraries, or gave as gifts to their friends or to well-known scholars. They were usually people who had good handwriting.

Their work tools were usually made of wood by the bookbinders themselves.

This craft was practiced traditionally in Gjakova, from generation to generation, by the members of Doli family until recently. In the second half of the 19th century, Bajram Jusuf Doli was mentioned in regarding the craft of the bookbinder. There are over one hundred manuscripts that are kept in different collections in Kosova, which have been copied and bound by Bajram Doli. There are also some other famous bookbinders, such as: Mullah Bajram Efendi Doli, Mullah Hamdi Efendi Doli, Tahir Efendi Boshnjaku, Muhamed Tahir Jaka, etc.

- Other crafts

Other well-known crafts of Gjakova are barbers, drugstores, soap work, farriers, potters, quilt work, clog work, watchmakers, millers, smiths, butchers, cart work, chest workers, and confectionery. According to some statistics of the beginning of the 20th century in Gjakova there were up to 400 crafts.

== The "Esnaf" ==
From the crosscut sources and from the verbal declarations of the head esnafs or its members, we learn that in Gjakova, the esnaf saved their function and authority up to late, up to the third decade of the 20th century. Therefore, from the declarations of the tailors head esnaf, Mr. Ahmet Domi, on 21 June 1924, we learn that this esnaf with humanitarian aid collected from its members and other charitable people, bought shops, fields, valleys, etc., and from their benefits helped the poor members of the esnaf and other people in need. With this income they built a bridge above the stream, called the Terzi Bridge, that is 120m long.

Besides many other functions, craftsmen were also known for their humanitarian activities, such as helping the poor, the ill and disabled people. The most known craftsman, was the head-craft of the tailors, who dispersed to their members and the poor ones, food aid, built public buildings, fountains, bridges, etc.

Gjakova belonged to the cities, which during the 18th and 19th centuries, used the weakness and anarchy, which covered the Ottoman Empire and its administrative system, by empowering the power of esnafs in the Bazaar up to the level of non-defying the local governmental authority or the influence of "bejlers" (person of higher rank). The bound of craftsmen to [snafs and the rigorous respecting of their rules saved the trade development to the Grand Bazaar and the beginning of the 20th century, when, from the lack of authority of the state government, the esnafs kept the order and peace with power of weapons.

At the head of the Esnaf, the best master craftsmen were chosen, so called more "esnafli". Therefore, the power of the head if the esnaf, that in Gjakova was called "Qehaja", was very big. In Gjakova the head of the esnaf carried a special stick or cane, which was the sign of the authority that he had. This cane he used as a signal for closing a shop of a craftsman, which broke the rules of the esnaf. There were case when he ordered the closure of one shop for limited time, for three, six months or for a year. But there were also cases when the head of the esnaf closed the shop good and recessed the owner from the esnaf forever. At the 19th century in Gjakova it is mentioned the most known head of the esnaf of the tailors, Latif Gjuza.

== Traditional clothes ==
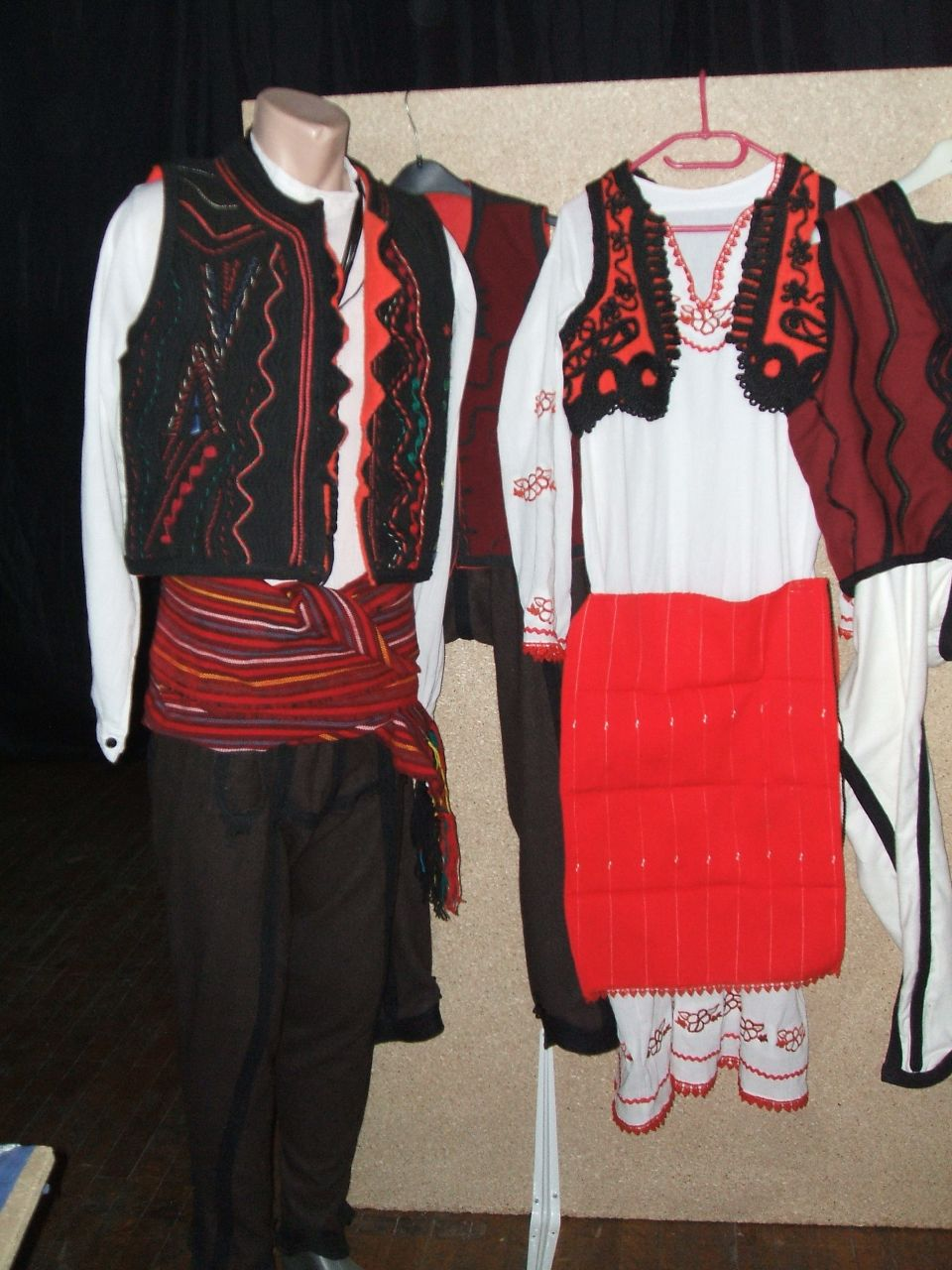
Traditional clothes of Gjakova

Albanian folk costumes in Kosovo differ from one place to another, according to the age, and purpose, such as those used in a solemn act with the ones in ritual acts. They are all linked with the customs code itself and to a certain degree they are subject to different cultures identifying therewith the culture of those who lived in those regions. This is typical also for other Albanian regions. However, it is characteristic that this influence of foreign cultures has the strongest impact on ladies' costumes and quite a little on men’s wear. As in other ethno-cultural fields, there are different explanations in the sphere of tradition as a result of its outstretching and comparison of study. Province features differ gradually passing from one territory to another. Brilliant works from Gjakova are wanted and somehow used in every town.

The young brides worked the folk costumes to have different feasts and events, in order to preserve the clothing tradition. This wear was replaced by modern wear receiving the denomination "Allafranga", ("in the western fashion"). However, for a long time the folk costumes continued to be worked out within household economies by the women themselves. Gjakova with its surroundings was known as a place of fabric production. The connection with bigger towns, such as Peja, Prizren, Pristina, Mitrovica, resulted in many clothing materials, as well as special parts for waistcoats, socks, shorts being bought ready-made. The Dukagjini Plain has been the place where the traditional costume has been developed the most. This region of Kosovo, binding the northern part of Albania with the Gjakova Highland area, mainly Tropoja and including the Has are, has cultivated a tradition in costumes, being therefore in the first place.

== Museums ==
- Ethnographic Museum
- Gjakova Regional Museum

== Bibliography ==
- Beqiraj, Ajete (2007). "The Bektashi Tekke opens its doors for believers all over the world". dw.de.
- CHwB. (2011). Integrated Conservation. Available: http://chwbkosovo.org/full.php?category=39&template=full. Last accessed 1 March 2014.
- Fejaz Drancolli (2007). Hadum Mosque & Bazaar in Gjakova. Pristina: Ministry of Culture, Youth and Sport. 1-47.
- Institute for Conservation of Cultural Monuments, Ministry of Culture, Youth and Sport. Archives,
- Kujtim Rrahmani, Shkelzen Rexha (2009). Tourist guide Gjakova City and Valbona Valley. Gjakove: Artesa. 1-80.
- Masar Rizvanolli (2009). Grand Bazaar of Gjakova. Gjakove: Association of Intellectuals. 1-100.
