= Esnaf =

Turkish word for tradespeople

Esnaf is a Turkish word which means "corporation". During the Early Modern Period belonging to a guild gave people a voice and was an important part of one's identity. Handicraft producers were linked to one another by a range of social, political, and economic ties. Guilds varied among societies, social class, and genders. There were many misconceptions, differences, as well as similarities between Europe and the Ottoman Empire. There were hierarchies within guilds; sometimes they shared tools, worked together, or worked alone.

== History ==
In the Early Modern Period, collective identity was mainly established by normative framework, but was also a result of the process of interaction itself, and could be manipulated according to the circumstances. During the fourteenth and fifteenth centuries the Islamic state created a system, based upon an open- minded interpretation of Islam's attitude toward rival monotheists that allowed inclusion for the Christians and Jews who populated the conquered lands of Anatolia and the Balkans. The uprising of Istanbul in 1651 was a successful protest against dominant authority. The people marched on the palace and got a powerful religious leader on their side in order to get the vizier to step down. They made their voices heard as a group within their guild, and gave people a sense of pride to belong to a guild. Economic activity within guilds was controlled by political powers.

== Misconceptions ==
Contrary to general assumption, even in the highly segmented world of the Early Modern Period, trading Diasporas did not simply act as middlemen within dominant societies, but also developed durable commercial ties with other merchant groups outside any institutional structure. Not all workers were equal among guilds; many of them had hierarchies which varied among different regions. "There might be four or five different shoemakers". Being a part of a guild was a great way for people to create compositions; it became a major part of one's identity. It was assumed that guilds declined due to repressed innovations but in all truth guilds declined mainly due to political issues. Political authorities were very much a part of production within guilds and controlled all economic factors involved. The prosperity and commercial success of merchants were both a cause and consequence of their domination of urban politics. Guilds are often associated with the medieval times in nature but guilds have been along for a long time; even prior the medieval era. Guilds are often associated with Europe only as well, but in fact guilds were a massive part of the Ottoman Empire too. Guilds within the Ottoman Empire and Europe had both their similarities and differences.

== Europe ==
Metal products created a significant share of the goods handled by European merchants; but their most important commodities were raw and finished cloth. Guilds were mainly male dominated but wives and servants still played an important role in production. In some cases woman could even hold formal positions and widows could inherit. Stocking knitting became a common livelihood for the poor in numerous parts of Europe, because it required more or less no capital investment; knitters would use yearn from their own sheep or yarn given by merchants. All social classes were allowed, but there still was an evident hierarchy within the guilds. Although, religion was more exclusive; therefore Jews were marginalized. Europe was a very spiritual economy meaning people took care of each other and would help when one another when they could. For example, there were charitable services. Around 1560, Antwerp reached its peak of its success just before the revolt of the Netherlands.

== Ottoman Empire ==
In the Ottoman Empire many young woman were hired to unwind cocoon, spin silk threads, and weave. Also, there were many woman groups outside of guilds such as cloth makers. Woman would exchange good among each other within female markets. In the late sixteenth century estates of peasant woman living near Konya and owning some jewellery have been stumbled upon, which indicates market links.

Guilds were a major part of an economy that was very state dominated like the Ottoman Empire. The Ottoman dynasty, especially along its seaboards and borderlands opportunities of commerce tended to diversify economies and put together sundry people and ideas. The Ottoman society was extremely mixed main due to conquest and immigration; therefore there was a vast number of religion and Jews were very much included. The Ottoman society was a spiritual economy but not as much as Europe. This was mainly because the Ottoman Empire was mixed religiously meaning there were many different religions mixed within guilds.

Guilds were an urban phenomenon. The Ottomans had politics as much as commerce in mind when they negotiated and dispersed capitulations. The Ottoman- Venetian conflicts led to international commerce booms in Dubrovnik, Florence, Ancona, and Genoa. In the fifteenth and early sixteenth centuries Florence, Genoa, and Venice vied for control of Ottoman markets and merchandises. Primarily in the north and east, Muslim traders dominated several Ottoman exchanges and some international routes. There were links between cities and the countryside; although, direct commercial exchanges were probably the exception rather than the rule. The Empire was separated into zones so that civilians were limited to buying only from the source that they had been assigned to.

== Division of labor ==
In small towns, craft structures might be reasonably simple, for example, with one type or a few types at the most of tailors who made up fabrics into ready to wear clothing; but large cities producers were highly specialized. Different guilds often produced similar goods. "Collective workshops were considered more desirable by more substantial craftsmen themselves". This would make collective workshops a suitable means of social control. Every member was monitored very closely; there were influential members but no one completely controlled the productivity of other fellow members. Partnerships existed, although it is unknown how common partnerships occurred. A more modern type of labor division also existed during the Early Modern Period. During this time bleachers, twisters, and dyers craftsmen not only owned their own equipment but their own shops as well. A compound product such as silk may go through the hands of many different craftsmen prior to reaching the consumer.

== See also ==
- Diaspora
- Journeyman
- Masterpiece
- Trade union
