= Guberevac (Knić) =

Coordinates: 43.8317°N 20.7731°E

Guberevac Губеревац
- Village
- Interactive map of Guberevac
- Country: Serbia
- District: Šumadija
- Municipality: Knić
- Time zone: UTC+1 (CET)
  - Summer (DST): UTC+2 (CEST)

Guberevac (Serbian: Губеревац) is a village situated in Knić municipality in Serbia.
