= Dragušica =

Coordinates: 43.9642°N 20.6972°E

- Village
- Interactive map of Dragušica
- Country: Serbia
- District: Šumadija
- Municipality: Knić
- Time zone: UTC+1 (CET)
  - Summer (DST): UTC+2 (CEST)

Dragušica (Serbian: Драгушица) is a village situated in Knić municipality in Serbia.
