= Bečevica =

Coordinates: 43.9881°N 20.6353°E

- Village
- Interactive map of Bečevica
- Country: Serbia
- Municipality: Knić
- Time zone: UTC+1 (CET)
  - Summer (DST): UTC+2 (CEST)

Bečevica (Serbian: Бечевица) is a village situated in Knić municipality Šumadija District in Serbia.
