= Brnjica (Knić) =

Village situated in Knić municipality

Brnjica Брњица
- Village
- Location within Serbia
- Coordinates: 43°58′34″N 20°44′07″E
- Country: Serbia
- District: Šumadija
- Municipality: Knić
- Time zone: UTC+1 (CET)
  - Summer (DST): UTC+2 (CEST)

Brnjica is a village situated in Knić municipality, Šumadija District in Serbia.
