= Vrbeta =

Coordinates: 43°51′34″N 20°48′03″E

- Village
- Interactive map of Vrbeta
- Country: Serbia
- District: Šumadija District
- Municipality: Knić
- Time zone: UTC+1 (CET)
  - Summer (DST): UTC+2 (CEST)

Vrbeta is a village situated in Knić municipality in Serbia.
