= Bajčetina =

Bajčetina Бајчетина
- Village
- Interactive map of Bajčetina
- Coordinates: 43.8642°N 20.8919°E
- Country: Serbia
- Municipality: Knić

Area
  - Total: 7.48 km^{2} (2.89 sq mi)
- Elevation: 809 m (2,654 ft)

Population (2011)
  - Total: 34
  - Density: 4.5/km^{2} (12/sq mi)
- Time zone: UTC+1 (CET)
  - Summer (DST): UTC+2 (CEST)

Bajčetina (Serbian Cyrillic: Бајчетина, pronounced [bâjtʃetina]) is a village situated in Knić municipality in Šumadija, Serbia. It is the birthplace of the former President of Serbia, Tomislav Nikolić.
