= Balosave =

Balosave may refer to:

- Balosave, Serbia, a village near Knić
- Balosave, Nikšić, a village in Nikšić municipality, Montenegro
