= Zabojnica =

- Village
- Location within Serbia
- Coordinates: 44°00′00″N 20°45′02″E
- Country: Serbia
- District: Šumadija District
- Municipality: Knić

Population (2002)
  - Total: 500
  - Density: 130/sq mi (50/km^{2})
- Time zone: UTC+1 (CET)
  - Summer (DST): UTC+2 (CEST)

Zabojnica is a village situated in Knić municipality in Serbia, near the city of Kragujevac.
