= Grabovac (Knić) =

Grabovac Грабовац
- Village
- Location within Serbia
- Country: Serbia
- District: Šumadija
- Municipality: Knić
- Time zone: UTC+1 (CET)
  - Summer (DST): UTC+2 (CEST)

Grabovac (Serbian: Грабовац) is a village situated in Knić municipality in Serbia.
