= Guncati (Knić) =

Coordinates: 43°53′04″N 20°39′48″E

Guncati Гунцати
- Village
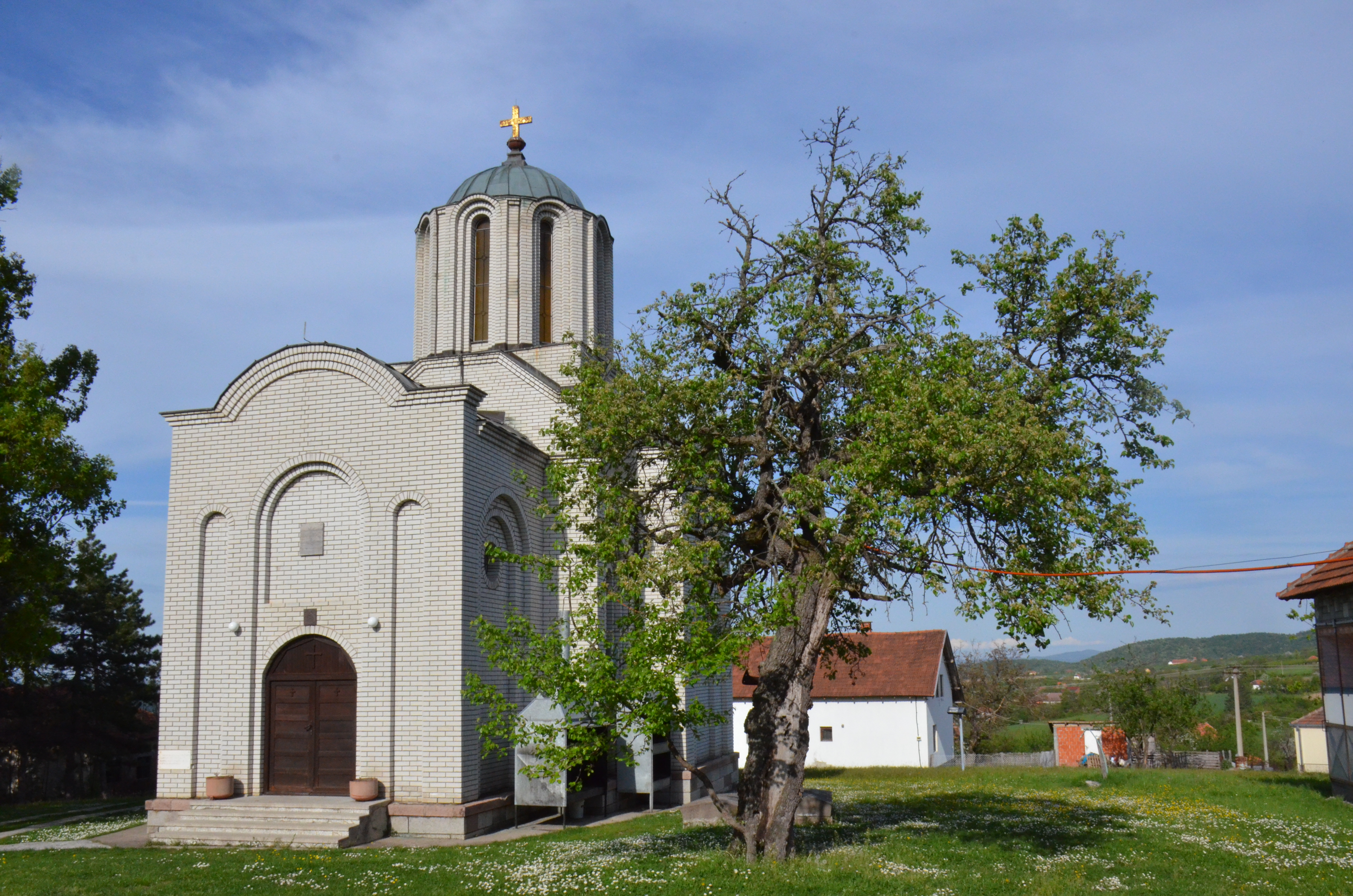
- Church in village Guncati, municipality Knić, Serbia
- Interactive map of Guncati
- Country: Serbia
- District: Šumadija
- Municipality: Knić
- Time zone: UTC+1 (CET)
  - Summer (DST): UTC+2 (CEST)

Guncati (Serbian: Гунцати) is a village situated in Knić municipality in Serbia.
