= Ugljarevac =

Ugljarevac Угљаревац (Serbian)
- Village
- Location within Serbia
- Coordinates: 44°05′58″N 20°41′33″E
- Country: Serbia
- District: Šumadija District
- City: Kragujevac

Population (2011)
  - Total: 129
- Time zone: UTC+1 (CET)
  - Summer (DST): UTC+2 (CEST)

Ugljarevac (Serbian: Угљаревац) is a village in the city area of Kragujevac, Serbia. According to the 2011 census, the village has a population of 129 people.
