= Šumadija fairground =

Coordinates: 44.0251°N 20.9295°E

The Šumadija fairground (Serbian: Šumadija sajam) is an exhibition area in Kragujevac, Šumadija District, Serbia, featuring 3,500 m^{2} of covered indoor space. The fair was established on 9 May 2005 in Kragujevac. One of the fairs with most success was the Šumadija Beer Open which was organised for the first time on 6 June 2007.
