= Dubrava (Knić) =

Coordinates: 43°59′36″N 20°44′01″E

Dubrava Дубрава
- Village
- Interactive map of Dubrava
- Country: Serbia
- District: Šumadija
- Municipality: Knić
- Time zone: UTC+1 (CET)
  - Summer (DST): UTC+2 (CEST)

Dubrava (Serbian: Дубрава) is a village situated in Knić municipality in Serbia.
