= Vučkovica (Knić) =

Vučkovica Вучковица
- Village
- Location within Serbia
- Coordinates: 43°56′40″N 20°47′20″E
- Country: Serbia
- District: Šumadija District
- Municipality: Knić
- Time zone: UTC+1 (CET)
  - Summer (DST): UTC+2 (CEST)

Vučkovica is a village situated in Knić municipality in Serbia.
