= Borač, Knić =

Borač Борач
- Village
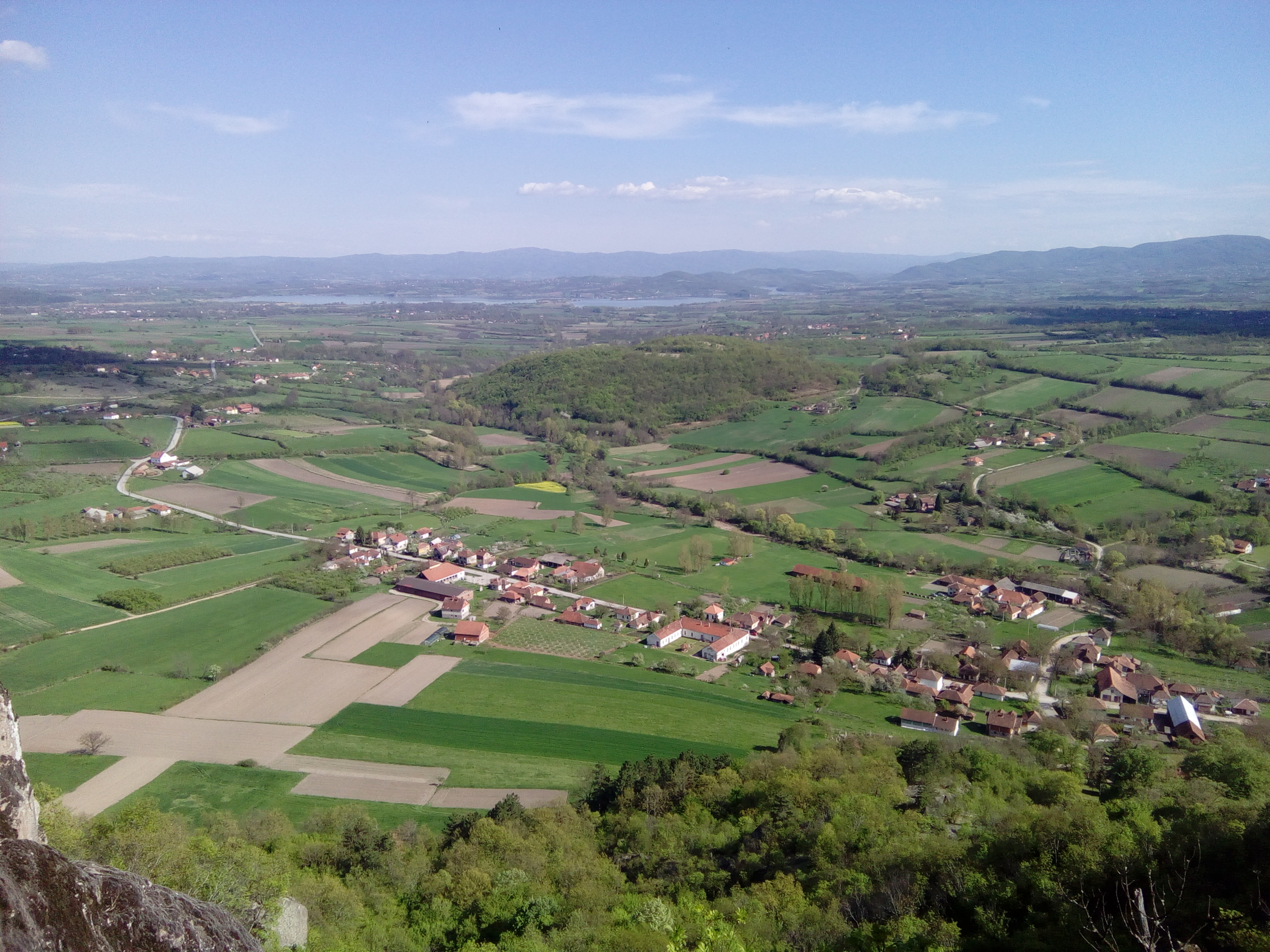

- Location within Serbia
- Coordinates: 43°57′38″N 20°36′24″E
- Country: Serbia
- Region: Šumadija and Western Serbia
- District: Šumadija
- Municipality: Knić
- Elevation: 1,093 ft (333 m)

Population (2011)
  - Total: 590
- Time zone: UTC+1 (CET)
  - Summer (DST): UTC+2 (CEST)

Borač is a village in the municipality of Knić, Serbia. It is at an elevation of 1,093 ft (333 m). According to the 2011 census, the village has a population of 590 inhabitants.

== Population ==
Population of Borač
| 1948 | 1953 | 1961 | 1971 | 1981 | 1991 | 2002 | 2011 |
| 1428 | 1398 | 1318 | 1176 | 1017 | 872 | 692 | 590 |
