= Kikojevac =

- Village
- Location within Serbia
- Coordinates: 44°02′N 20°44′E
- Country: Serbia
- District: Šumadija District
- Municipality: Knić
- Time zone: UTC+1 (CET)
  - Summer (DST): UTC+2 (CEST)

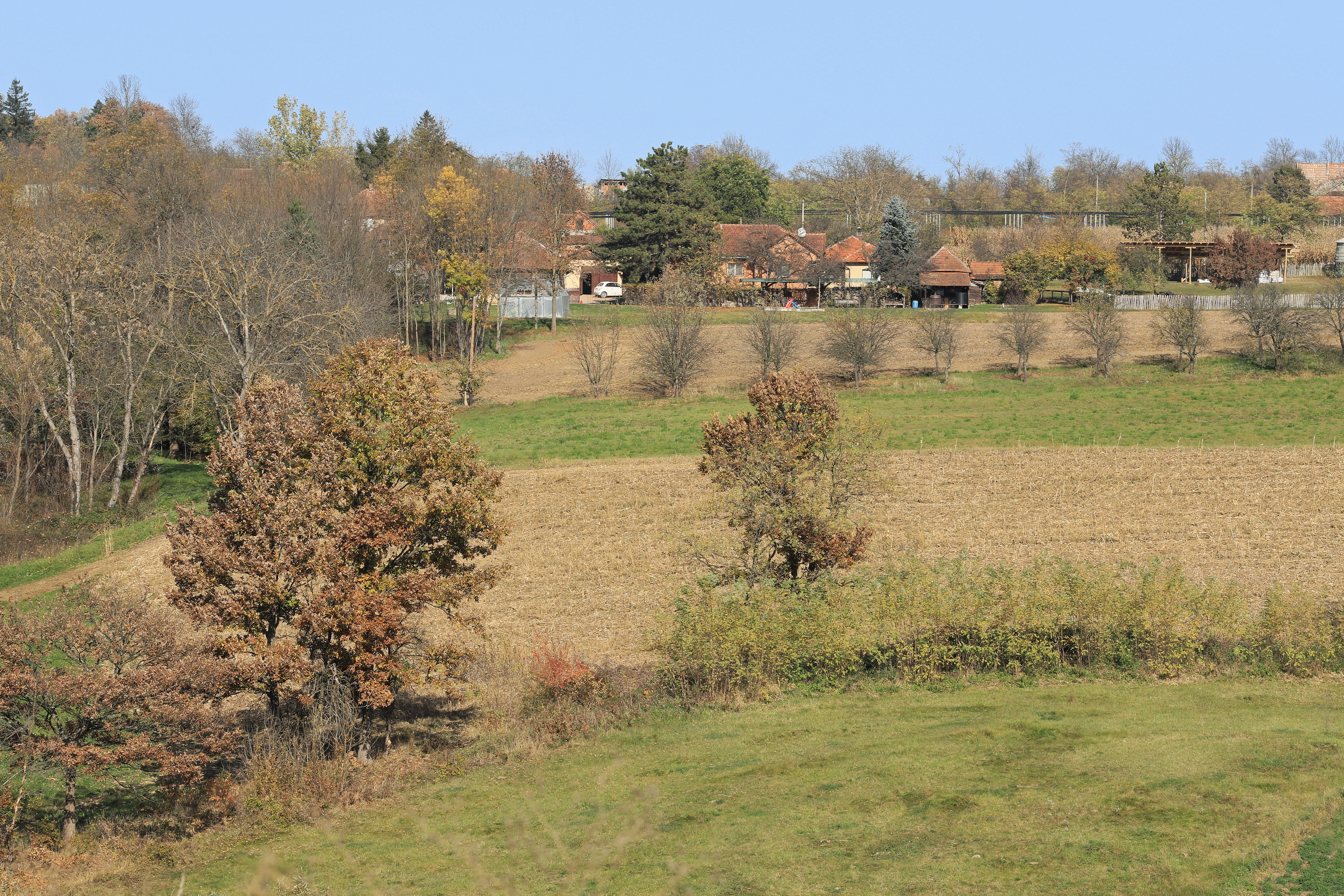
Village of Kikojevac

Kikojevac is a village situated in Knić municipality in Serbia.
