= Brestovac, Knić =

Brestovac Брестовац
- Village
- Location within Serbia
- Coordinates: 44°00′00″N 20°37′43″E
- Country: Serbia
- District: Šumadija
- Municipality: Knić
- Time zone: UTC+1 (CET)
  - Summer (DST): UTC+2 (CEST)

Brestovac is a village situated in Knić municipality, Šumadija District in Serbia.
