= Konjuša, Knić =

Konjuša Коњуша
- Village
- Location within Serbia
- Coordinates: 44°01′N 20°37′E
- Country: Serbia
- District: Šumadija District
- Municipality: Knić
- Time zone: UTC+1 (CET)
  - Summer (DST): UTC+2 (CEST)

Konjuša (Serbian: Коњуша) is a village situated in Knić municipality in Serbia.
