= Bare (Knić) =

Coordinates: 44°02′N 20°42′E

- Village
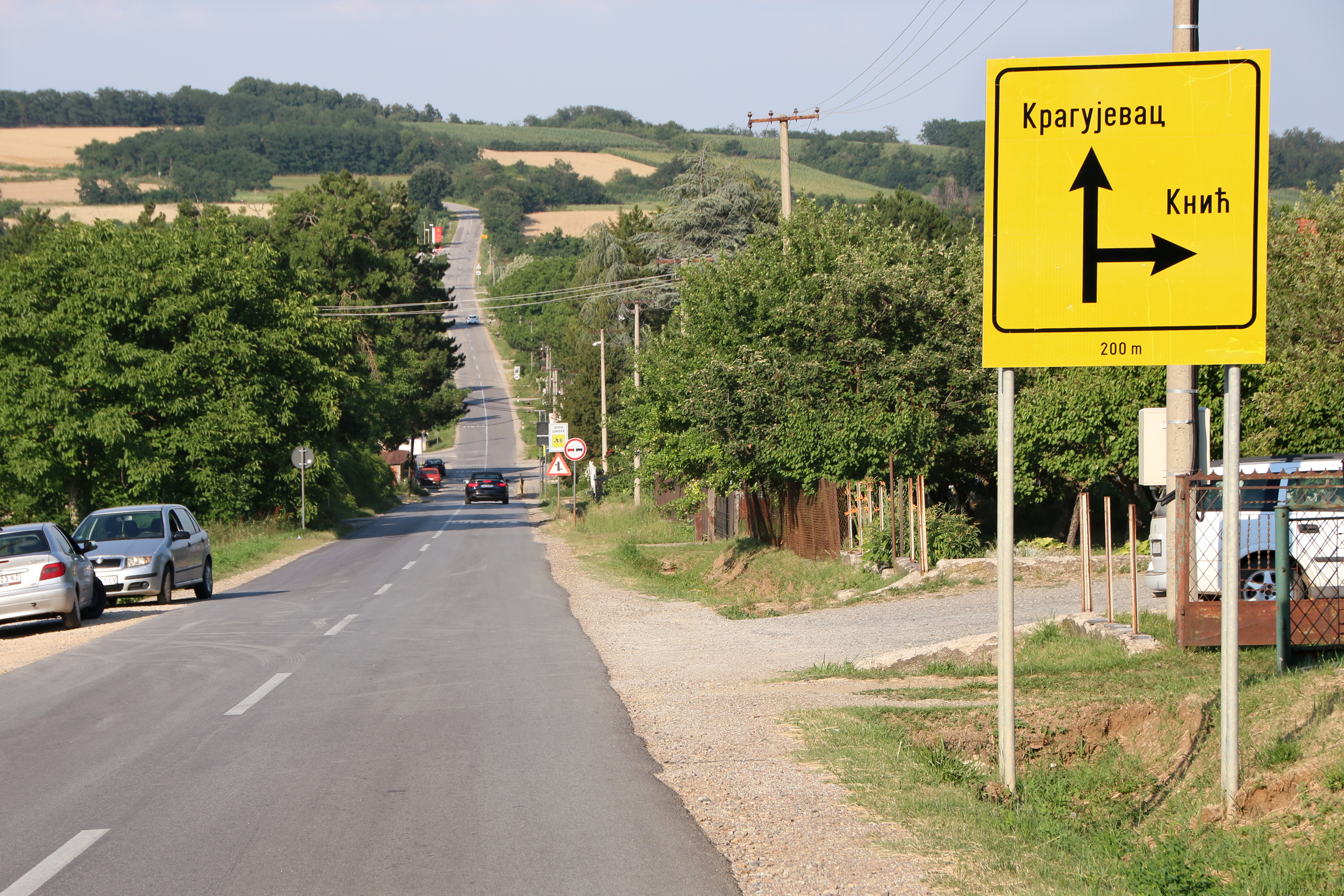
- Village of Bare
- Interactive map of Bare
- Country: Serbia
- Municipality: Knić
- Time zone: UTC+1 (CET)
  - Summer (DST): UTC+2 (CEST)

Bare (Serbian: Баре) is a village in Knić municipality, Šumadija district, Serbia. In 2002, it had 390 inhabitants.
