= Kneževac =

Kneževac may refer to:

- Kneževac, Belgrade, a Belgrade suburb near Rakovica, Serbia
- Kneževac (Sjenica), a village in Serbia
- Kneževac (Knić), a village in Serbia
- Kneževac, Croatia, a village near Čaglin
