= Kneževac (Knić) =

Kneževac Кнежевац
- Village
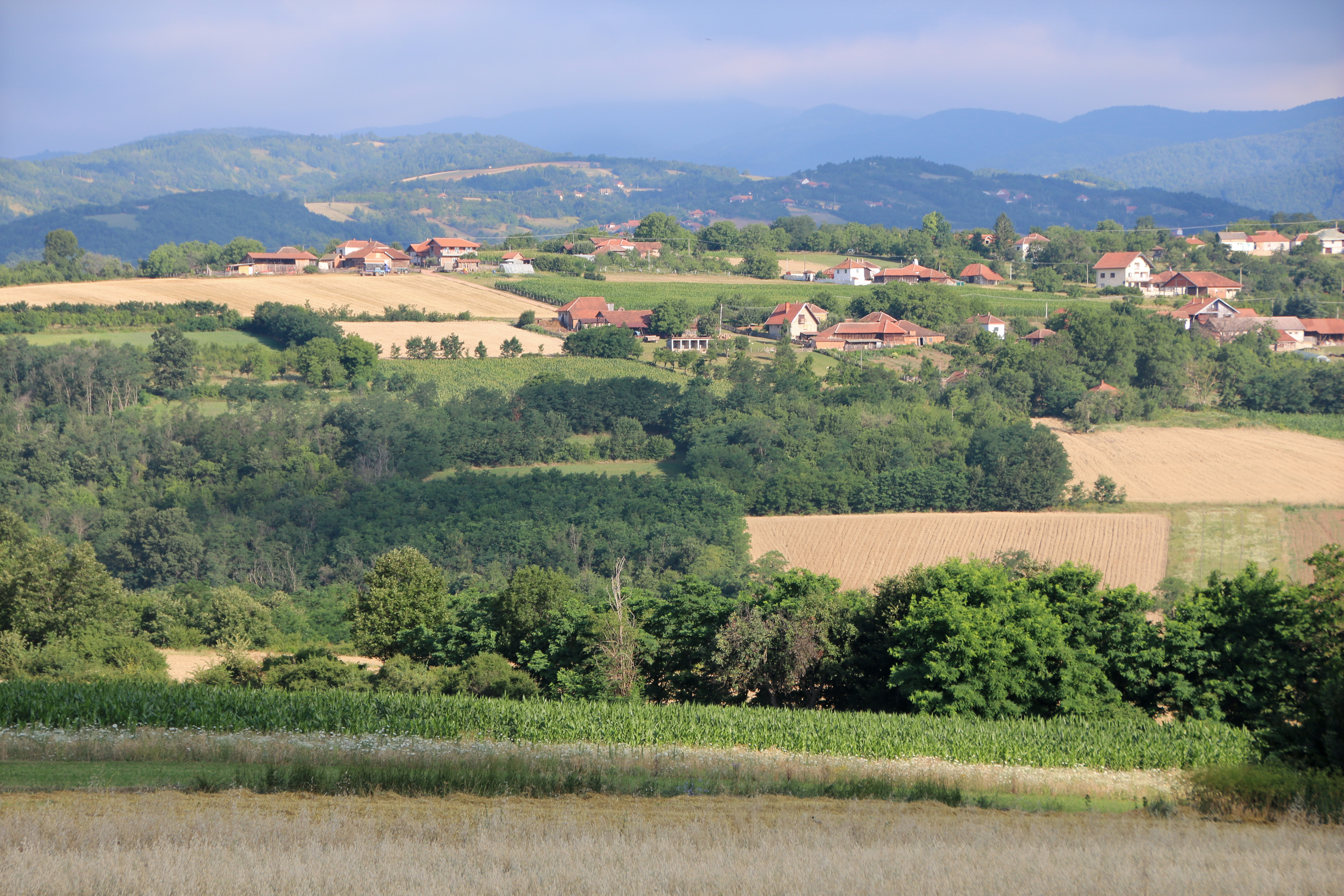
- Kneževac

- Location within Serbia
- Coordinates: 44°03′N 20°40′E
- Country: Serbia
- District: Šumadija District
- Municipality: Knić
- Time zone: UTC+1 (CET)
  - Summer (DST): UTC+2 (CEST)

Kneževac (Serbian: Кнежевац) is a village situated in Knić municipality in Serbia.
