= Grivac, Knić =

Grivac Гривац
- Village
- Location within Serbia
- Coordinates: 43°59′57″N 20°42′49″E
- Country: Serbia
- Region: Šumadija and Western Serbia
- District: Šumadija
- Municipality: Knić
- Elevation: 1,102 ft (336 m)

Population (2011)
  - Total: 371
- Time zone: UTC+1 (CET)
  - Summer (DST): UTC+2 (CEST)

Grivac is a village in the municipality of Knić, Serbia. According to the 2011 census, the village has a population of 371 inhabitants.

== Population ==
Population of Grivac
Year	1948	1953	1961	1971	1981	1991	2002	2011
Pop.	910	860	838	713	625	537	458	371
±%	—	−5.5%	−2.6%	−14.9%	−12.3%	−14.1%	−14.7%	−19.0%
