= Biljana Ilić Stošić =

Serbian politician (born 1964)

Biljana Ilić Stošić (Serbian Cyrillic: Биљана Илић Стошић; born 25 March 1964) is a politician in Serbia. She served in the National Assembly of Serbia from 2012 to 2016 as a member of the Serbian Progressive Party. Since 2016, she has been commissioner of the Šumadija District.

== Early life and career ==
Ilić Stošić is a graduate of the University of Belgrade Faculty of Political Sciences and the University of Belgrade Faculty of Philosophy. She has said that as a student she was most inspired by the ethical teachings of German classical philosophy. She has taught ethics and philosophy at the medical school "Sestre Ninković."

== Politician ==
=== Municipal ===
Ilić Stošić received the eighth position on the electoral list of the far-right Serbian Radical Party in the 2008 elections for the Kragujevac municipal assembly. The party won eighteen mandates, and she was subsequently included in its assembly delegation. (From 2000 to 2011, mandates in Serbian elections were distributed to listed candidates at the discretion of successful parties and coalitions, and it was common practice for the mandates to be awarded out of numerical order. Ilić Stošić did not automatically receive a mandate by virtue of her list position, but she was included in the delegation all the same.)

The Radical Party experienced a serious split later in 2008, with several members joining the more moderate Serbian Progressive Party. Ilić Stošić was among those who sided with the Progressives. When the party's city board for Kragujevac was established, she was selected as one of the party's three local vice-presidents.

Serbia's electoral system was reformed prior to the 2012 Serbian local elections, such that mandates were awarded in numerical order to candidates on successful lists. Ilić Stošić was given the third position local on the Progressive list and was re-elected when the list won eighteen mandates. She was again re-elected in the local elections of 2016 and 2020, after receiving the third position on the Progressive list on each occasion.

=== Member of the National Assembly ===
Ilić Stošic received the sixty-sixth position on the Progressive Party's Let's Get Serbia Moving list in the 2012 Serbian parliamentary election and was elected when the list won seventy-three mandates. The Progressives subsequently formed a coalition government with the Socialist Party of Serbia and other parties, and Ilić Stošič served as part of the government's parliamentary majority. She received the eighty-fourth position on the successor Aleksandar Vučić — Future We Believe In list in the 2014 parliamentary election and was re-elected when the list won a landslide victory with 158 seats. She was a member of the committee on local self-government during her time in the assembly.

She was given the 165th position on the Progressive Party's Aleksandar Vučić — Serbia Is Winning list in the 2016 parliamentary election. The list won 131 mandates, and on this occasion she was not returned.

=== Commissioner for Śumadija ===
Ilić Stošić was appointed commissioner for Šumadija on 1 July 2020, shortly after leaving the assembly. In June 2020, she was confirmed for a second four-year term.
