= Balosave, Serbia =

Coordinates: 43°51′N 20°47′E

Balosave
- Village
- Interactive map of Balosave
- Country: Serbia
- Municipality: Knić
- Time zone: UTC+1 (CET)
  - Summer (DST): UTC+2 (CEST)

Balosave (Serbian: Балосаве) is a village situated in Knić municipality, Šumadija District in Serbia.
