= Borač Fortress =

Borač Борач на Кршу
- near Knić; Serbia
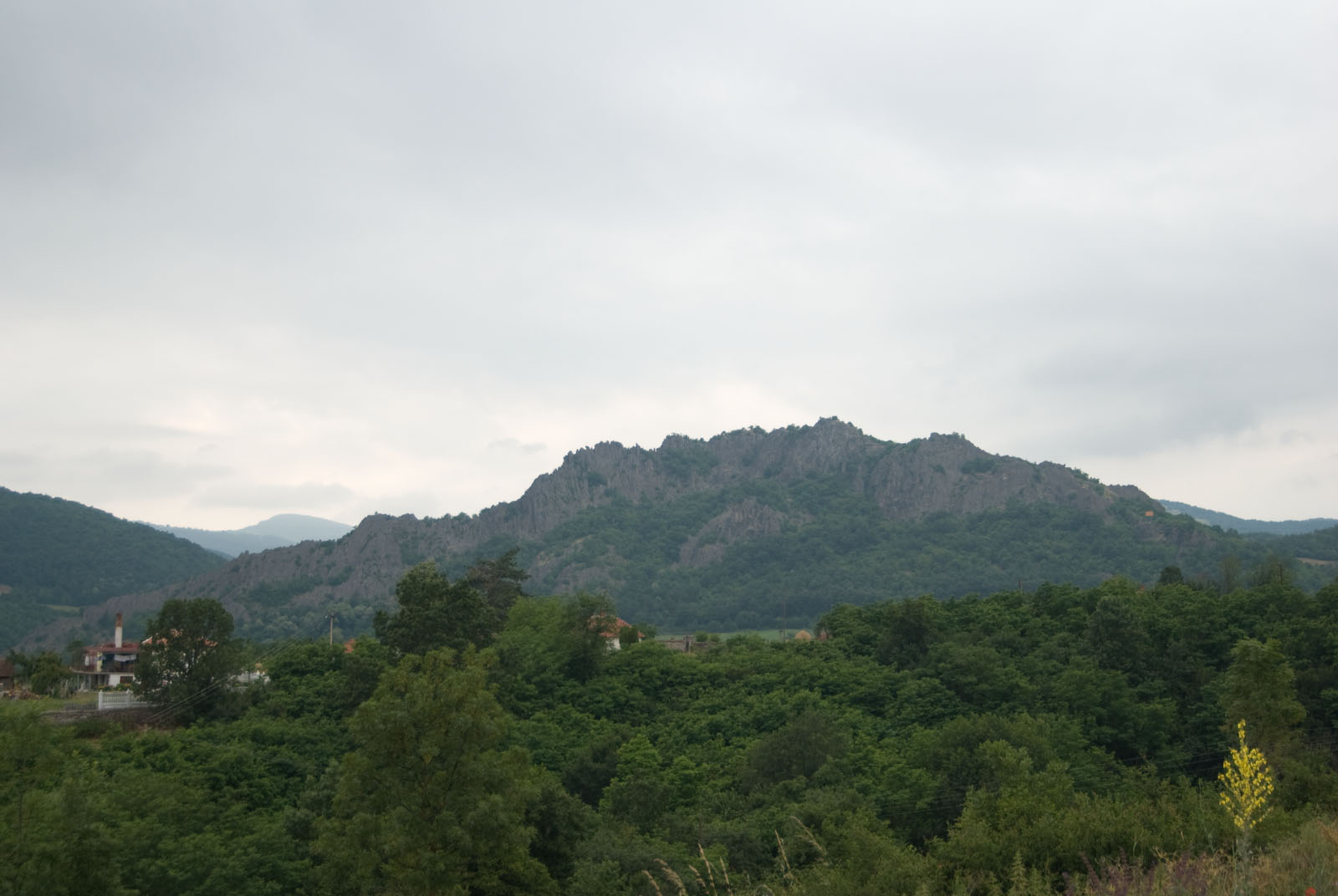
- Borački krš, the hill where the fortress was built

Site information
- Type: Strategic fortification
- Open to the public: Yes
- Condition: Razed

Location
- Coordinates: 43°57′50″N 20°36′9″E

Site history
- Built: 14th century
- Built by: Stefan Lazarević
- Materials: Stone

Borač (Serbian Cyrillic: Борач), also known as Borač na Kršu, is a medieval town and fortress. The remains of the Borač fortress lie on top of a rocky hill 10km northwest of Knić and are protected as a cultural monument of great importance.

== History ==
Archeological findings confirm that the area of Borač hills has been inhabited for thousands of years. The first fort was built by the Romans, who used it as an observation post of an important Roman road.

Although the town of Borač existed as a center of a Serbian župa, or a district since 12th century, the fortification was first mentioned in the records from 1389 as a residence of princess Milica after the death of her husband, prince Lazar of Serbia in Battle of Kosovo earlier that year.

Despot Stefan Lazarevic promulgated a charter to the people of Dubrovnik in Borač in 1405. In that period, it was one of the most significant fortifications in the dominion. After the fall of Belgrade and Golubac, whilst building Smederevo, despot Đurađ Branković additionally fortified Borač. In 1438, the fortress was conquered and razed to the ground by sultan Murad II.

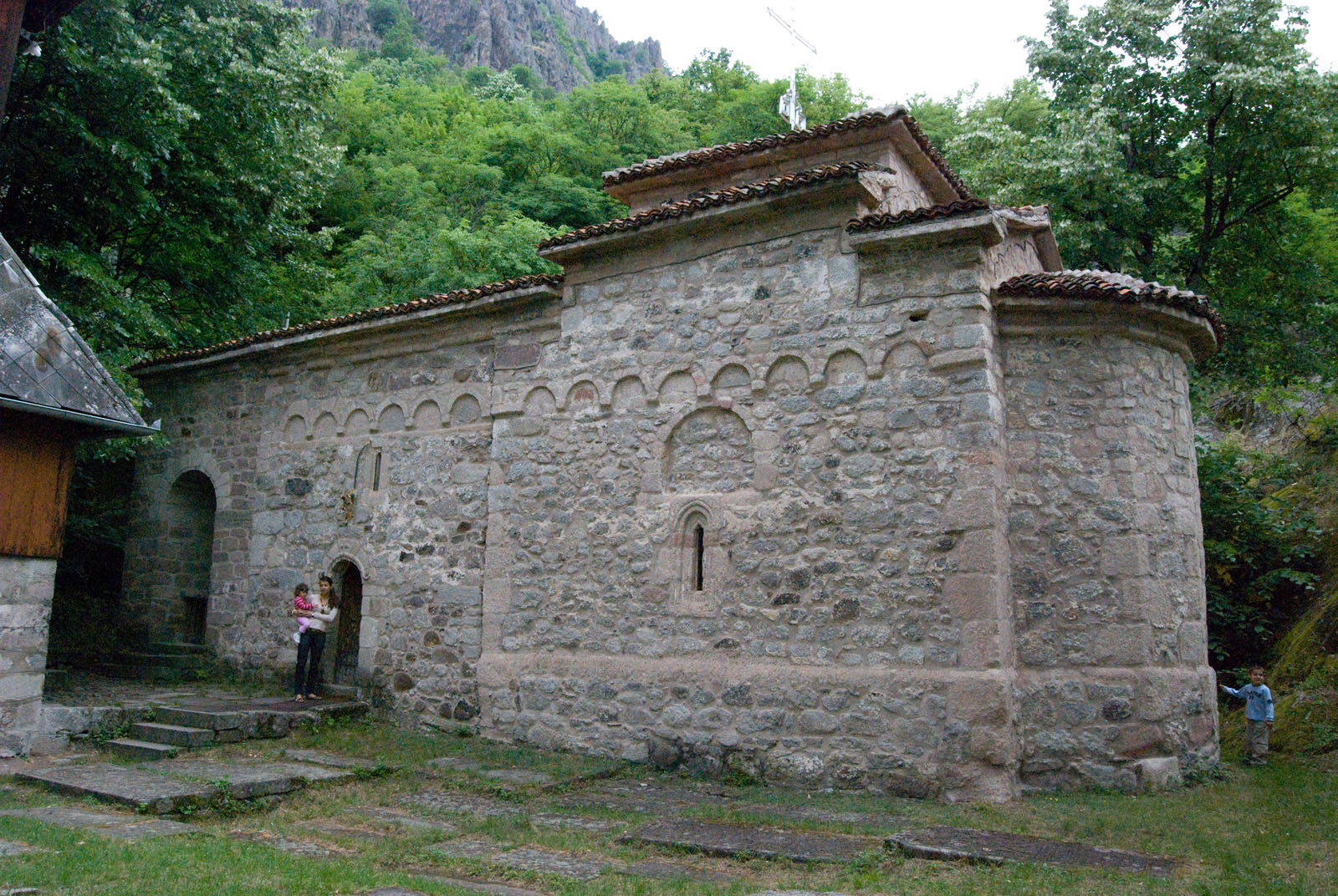
Church of Saint Archangel Mihailo in the village of Borač

== Characteristics ==
The fortress was built on Borački krš which is a section of an inactive volcano within the Rudnik massive that was formed 20 million years ago. The local quarry features tough stones used for fortress walls. The only well preserved object from the time of the despot Stefan, is the Saint Archangel Mihailo orthodox church just under the hill.

The walls were incorporated and well blended within the rocks, which serve as natural protection. The fortress consisted of the Big Town, located northeast and the Small Town, located southwest. The only features that currently remain of the fortress are the ruins of the bulwarks, several buildings and towers with irregular bases – three of them on the outside of the Big Town and one on the bulwark separating Small Town from the Big Town.

== See also ==
- Monuments of Culture of Great Importance
- Tourism in Serbia
