= Kusovac =

Coordinates: 43°57′31″N 20°40′02″E

- Village
- Interactive map of Kusovac
- Country: Serbia
- District: Šumadija District
- Municipality: Knić
- Time zone: UTC+1 (CET)
  - Summer (DST): UTC+2 (CEST)

Kusovac is a village situated in Knić municipality in Serbia.
