= Šumadija =

Historical and geographical region in Serbia

Šumadija Шумадија
- Historical and geographical region of Serbia
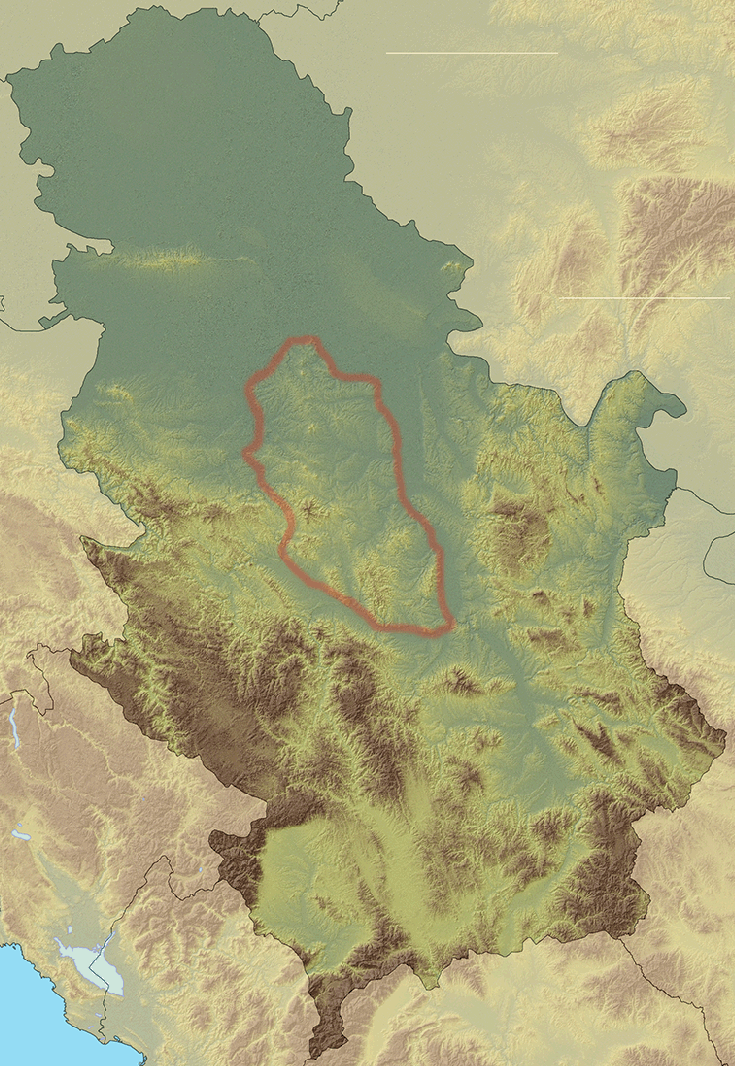
- Country: Serbia
- Largest city: Kragujevac

Population
  - Total: c. 800,000 (Note: The figure excludes the part of the Belgrade urban area geographically belonging to the Šumadija region.)

Šumadija (Serbian Cyrillic: Шумадија, pronounced [ʃumǎdija]) is a historical and geographical region in the central part of Serbia. The city of Kragujevac is the largest city of the region.

== Etymology ==
Šumadija was named after the dense, impassable forests that covered the region, hence the name (from šuma 'forest'). These forests were preserved until the early 19th century; they are mentioned in literature and tradition. Bertrandon de la Broquière (1400–1459) passed through Serbia; on the road from Palanka to Belgrade he "passed through very large forests." During the reign of Prince Miloš Obrenović (1817–1839), it was said of the dense forests that covered Serbia, "no one could walk through (them), let alone with horse." When Alphonse de Lamartine visited Serbia in 1833, he wrote that he felt as if he were "in the middle of the North American forests." In the villages of Jasenica, a tradition was maintained "that everywhere there were empty forests, and settlers called relatives to come and occupy the land how much they want ... the forests were in need of cutting down trees and burning for years ... it was so impassable, that one could walk for days through it, without seeing the sun."

== History ==
Archaeological sites of the Neolithic Starčevo culture and Vinča culture (5500–4500 BC) are widespread in Šumadija. Settlements of the late Starčevo phase are present across the entire territory of central Šumadija. Risovača Cave in Aranđelovac is one of the most important Paleolithic archaeological sites in Europe. Notable Neolithic sites include Grivac and Kusovac in the west, Divostin in the center, and Dobrovodica and Rajac in the east.

Šumadija was located directly northeast of Raška, the centre of the Serbian Principality. The exact location of its border with the Bulgarian Khanate in the 10th century is unclear. Prince Zaharija is known to have united several Slavic tribes along the common border to rebel against Bulgaria in the 920s. Časlav (r. 927–960) and Constantine Bodin (r. 1081–1101) may have held parts of Šumadija. The southern half of Šumadija later came under the rule of Grand Prince Stefan Nemanja and the Nemanjić dynasty.

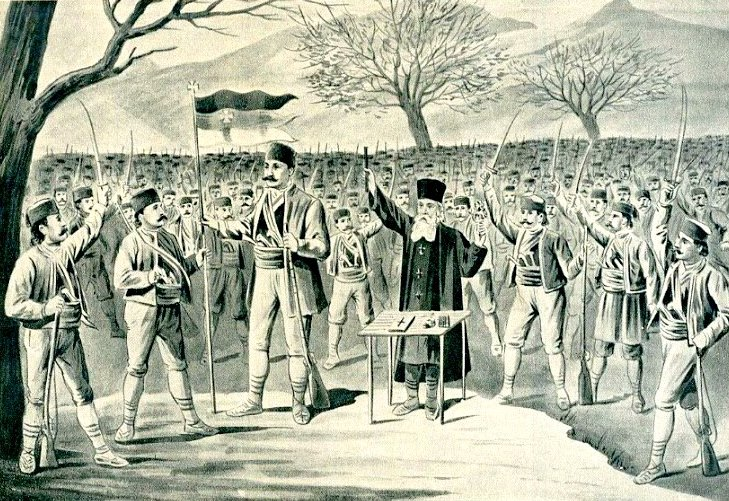
The Orašac Assembly, gathering of Serb leaders that decided to start First Serbian Uprising

Central Šumadija's three parts - Gruža, Jasenica, and Lepenica - most likely existed as administrative divisions or župe (counties) during the Byzantine era. Gruža was mentioned in the beginning of the 11th century as a peripheral province. The province of Lepenica, with the status of župa, officially entered Stefan Nemanja's realm in 1183; Nemanja later granted it as property (metochion) to his endowment, the Hilandar monastery, which he confirmed in the 1198 chrysobull. The province of Dendra, which was held by Serbian ruler Desa (fl. 1150–66), has been interpreted as Šumadija by some scholars, and as Toplica but it has been concluded that it was in the vicinity of Niš; Leskovac (historically Glubočica and Dubočica). The medieval Serbian state saw its end with the Serbian Despotate's fall in Šumadija in the 15th century.

Until the fall of the Serbian Despotate, the region was advanced, rich, and well-populated. This fact stands out in the accounts of travellers who passed through Šumadija during that period. Many topographic names that have survived to this day confirm old settlements, churches, and monasteries (selište, crkvine, manastirine, kućerine, podrumine, varoševo, etc.), as do old graveyards and other traces. After the fall of the Despotate, opportunities changed. The Ottoman invasion and other events that took place in Šumadija up until the early 19th century were the primary causes of depopulation. Fleeing their homes ahead of the Ottomans, the Šumadinci concealed themselves in the mountains and ravines or departed in various directions. Settlements disappeared, the churches and monasteries were destroyed, and the population constantly decreased. One traveller, Gerlach, described the path from Batočina to Palanka: "I couldn't find no trace of settlements or culture, everywhere there is wasteland, not a single piece of land has been cultivated, there is not a single village".

St. George Church, also known as Oplenac, the mausoleum of the House of Karađorđević near the town of Topola

Pavle Bakić, who had estates on the Venčac, left between 1515 and 1522 "with a large group of people into Hungary." Schweiger, who passed through Serbia in 1577, said that he travelled from Kolar "[through] a deserted region, scarcely settled and badly processed, in three days not having seen more than five poor villages." In groups or individually, families left their homeland and went in different directions, over (preko) the rivers to Syrmia, Banat, Bačka, and Slavonia; to Bosnia; and to other regions. This flight lasted until the end of the 18th century, then again after 1813. During the Austro-Turkish War, in 1788, the residents of the Šumadija villages Koraćica, Nemenikuće, and Rogače fled preko. Among them were Milovan Vidaković, who wrote, "We are watching the villages through which and along which we passed, all are already covered in grass, not a living soul in them, all has gone; vineyards, gardens, flats, it's all empty and lying in weeds." More flights ensued after 1813. For example, the parents of activist Ilija Milosavljević-Kolarac fled preko with the rest of the peasants in 1813 to hide from the Ottoman army. In Orašac, they crossed the Danube and settled in Crepaja, whence they later returned to their homes.

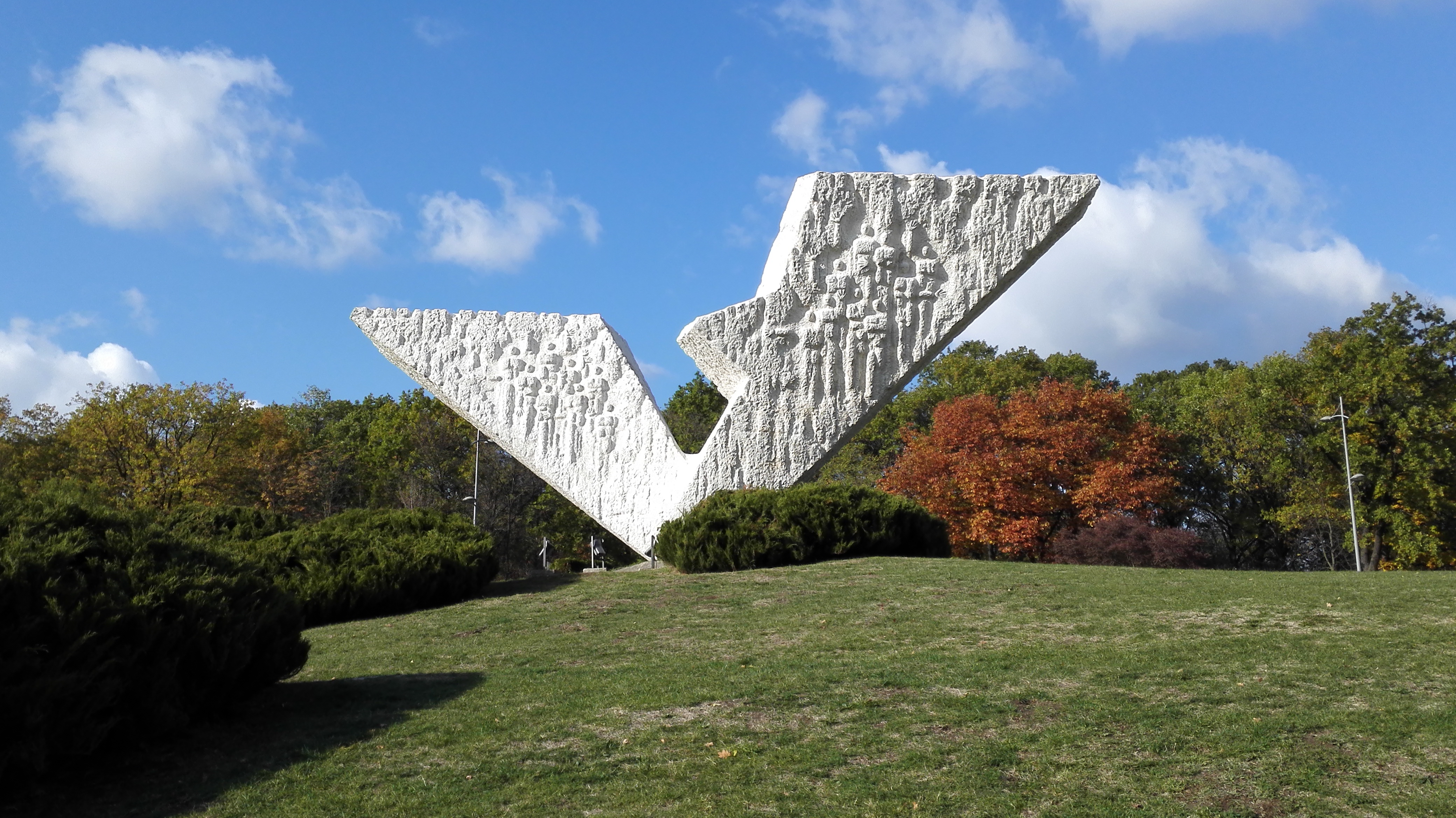
The Interrupted Flight monument, part of Šumarice Memorial Park, commemorating children killed by German forces during the Kragujevac massacre in 1941

During the 18th century, the forests and hills of Šumadija were a refuge for the hajduk bands (brigands, rebels, guerilla fighters) who fought against Ottoman occupation.In addition to emigration, there was also immigration, more or less, depending on the circumstance of the day in Šumadija. Parts of the Sanjak of Smederevo, all within Šumadija, were liberated by the Austrian army in 1718, resulting in the establishment of the Kingdom of Serbia (1718–1739). After the Austro-Turkish War (1788–1791), the sanjak was re-established. In 1788, the Habsburg-organized Serbian Free Corps liberated Šumadija, which, after subsequent Austrian military involvement, was joined with the rest of the sanjak under Koča's Frontier. The First Serbian Uprising, which broke out in 1804, saw the region liberated under self-organized Serbian rebels led by Šumadija-born Karađorđe. The Second Serbian Uprising in 1815 was led by Miloš Obrenović, who successfully repelled Ottoman forces and by 1830 gained full autonomy for Serbia, leading to the independence of central Serbia after several centuries under Ottoman rule.

Between 1922 and 1929, one of the administrative units in the Kingdom of Yugoslavia was the Šumadijska Oblast. It roughly included territory of present-day Šumadija District with its administrative seat in Kragujevac, which is the seat of the modern district as well.

== Geography ==
Šumadija is situated in the area between the Danube and Sava rivers to the north (according to some interpretations, the northern border of Šumadija lies between the mountains of Avala and Kosmaj while Belgrade does not belong to this region), the Great Morava to the east, the West Morava to the south, and the Dičina and Ljig rivers to the west. By contemporary markers, Šumadija is bordered by the following motorways: the A1 to the east and northeast, the A2 to the west and northwest, and the A5 to the south.

The geological region of Šumadija includes formations of enhanced uranium, such as the Brajkovac granitic massif, and volcanites of Medvednjak, Rudnik, and Borač, with high average instance of uranium and thorium.

== Demographics ==
=== Cities and towns ===
Cities and towns with a population larger than 20,000 include:

- Kragujevac (146,315)
- Gornji Milanovac (23,109)
- Aranđelovac (22,881)
- Mladenovac (22,346)
- Smederevska Palanka (20,345)

=== Anthropology ===
In the Šumadija subregions of Kačer, Gruža, Lepenica, Kragujevačka Jasenica, Smederevsko Podunavlje and Smederevska Jasenica, Kosmaj and in the villages around Belgrade, 8,894 kin families with 52,475 households were included in the early 20th century study of Jovan Cvijić. Of these, only 464 families with 3,603 houses were "old" (starinci, also called "natives"), which is close to the number of families of unknown descent (470 families with 2,464 houses), with the rest of the population being settlers (7,960 families, 46,408 houses). Šumadija was settled from almost all of the regions of the then Kingdom of Yugoslavia, though most of which came from the Dinaric areas, that is, Montenegro, Bosnia and Herzegovina, from Raška, Dalmatian Hinterland, Lika, and the rest of the Dinaric areas. In lesser numbers they hailed from Kosovo, from Metohija.

According to the same study, almost 90% of the families of Šumadija descended from settler families of various Serb ethnographic groups. The Dinaric group was predominant, while other South Slavic regions were present in lesser percentages. This diverse population blended, mutually permeated and leveled, thus creating an ethnographic group (the Šumadinci), with characteristical psychical traits.

Cvijić noted the particular striking character of the Šumadinci as "something very strong, bold, with great activeness, and healthy nerves", that many of them are capable, "it seems, they manage to succeed in any enterprise", and that "there is increasingly appearing personalities with great will", "Foreign observers would have the impression that everyone thrives with intractible persistence and tenacity", "Rigid traditionalism has almost completely disappeared. All adapt to new ways of life. There is less talk, less epic poems and epic preferences than in pure Dinaric people". Among other traits, the Šumadinac has "common sense, measures and sense of reality. They know how to assess things and events fairly and without anger, when they are fully aware of these. The peasants are often characterized by sensing measures, which is rarely held by their schooled compatriots." They were shown to be a very honest and humorous people.

== Culture ==
The most common folk costume of Serbia is that of Šumadija. It includes the national hat, the šajkača, and the traditional leather footwear, opanci. Older villagers still wear their traditional costumes.

The fertile region of Šumadija is particularly known for its plums and Slivovitz (Šljivovica), the production of which is of great importance to Šumadija Serbs and plays a part in several of their local customs.

=== In popular culture ===
Songs

- Smak, Šumadijski blues (1976)
- Braća Bajić, Šumadijo, šumovita, folk song (?)
  - interpreted by Bora Spužić Kvaka (1981), Predrag Gojković Cune, Radiša Urošević (1990s)
- Miroslav Ilić, Šumadijo, folk song (1982)
- Rade Petrović, Šumadijo ko bi tebe ostavio, folk song (1981)
  - interpreted by Era Ojdanić, Šumadijo, Šumadijo
- Snežana Đurišić, Odakle si, sele, folk song (1981)
- Gordana Stojićević, Dobro jutro Šumadijo, folk song (1979)
- Olivera Katarina, Šu, Šu, Šumadijo, pop song (1969)
- Vasilija Radojčić, Šumadijo, rodni kraju, folk song (?)
  - interpreted by Pavle Stefanović (1977)

== Gallery ==
Gruža

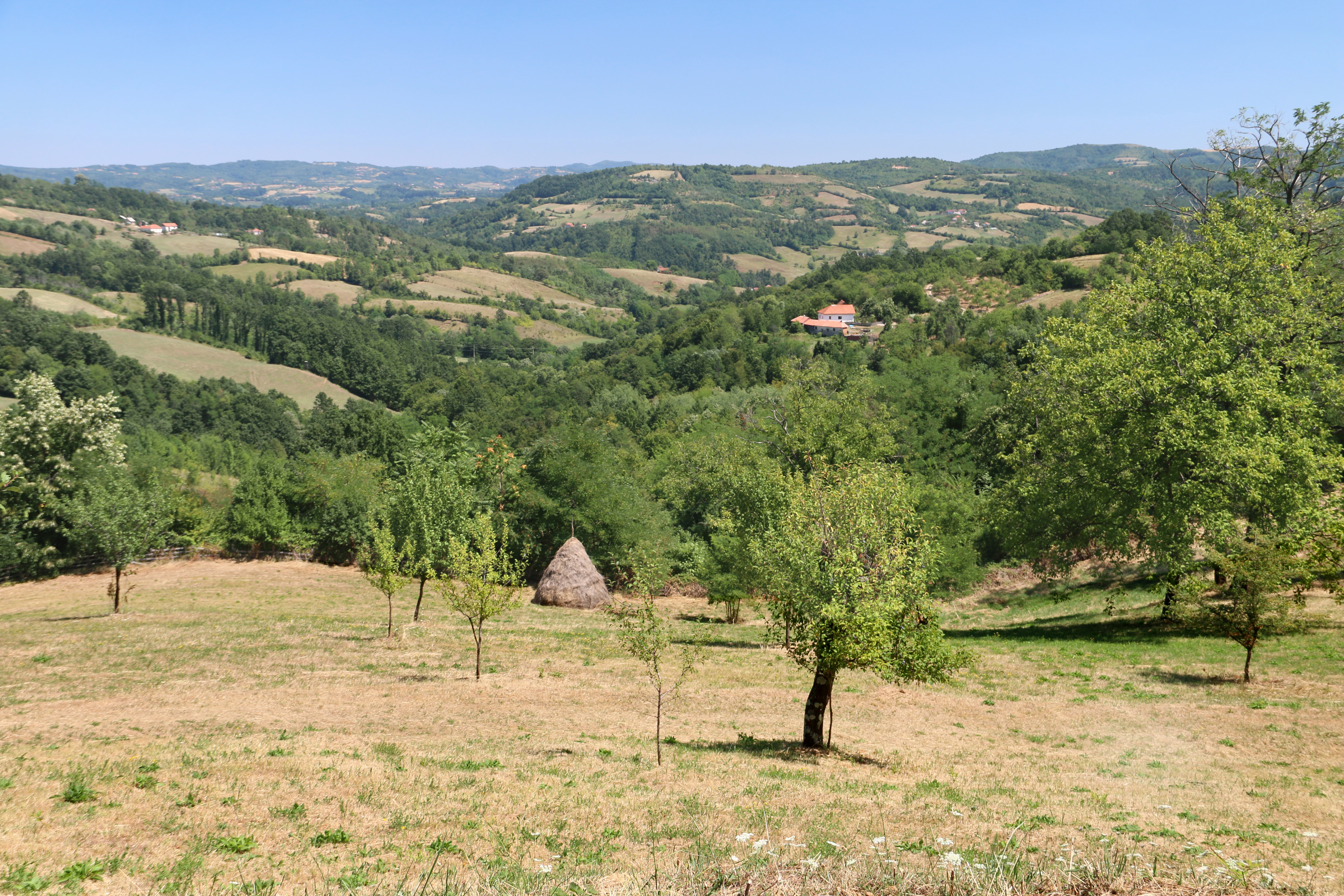
Kačer

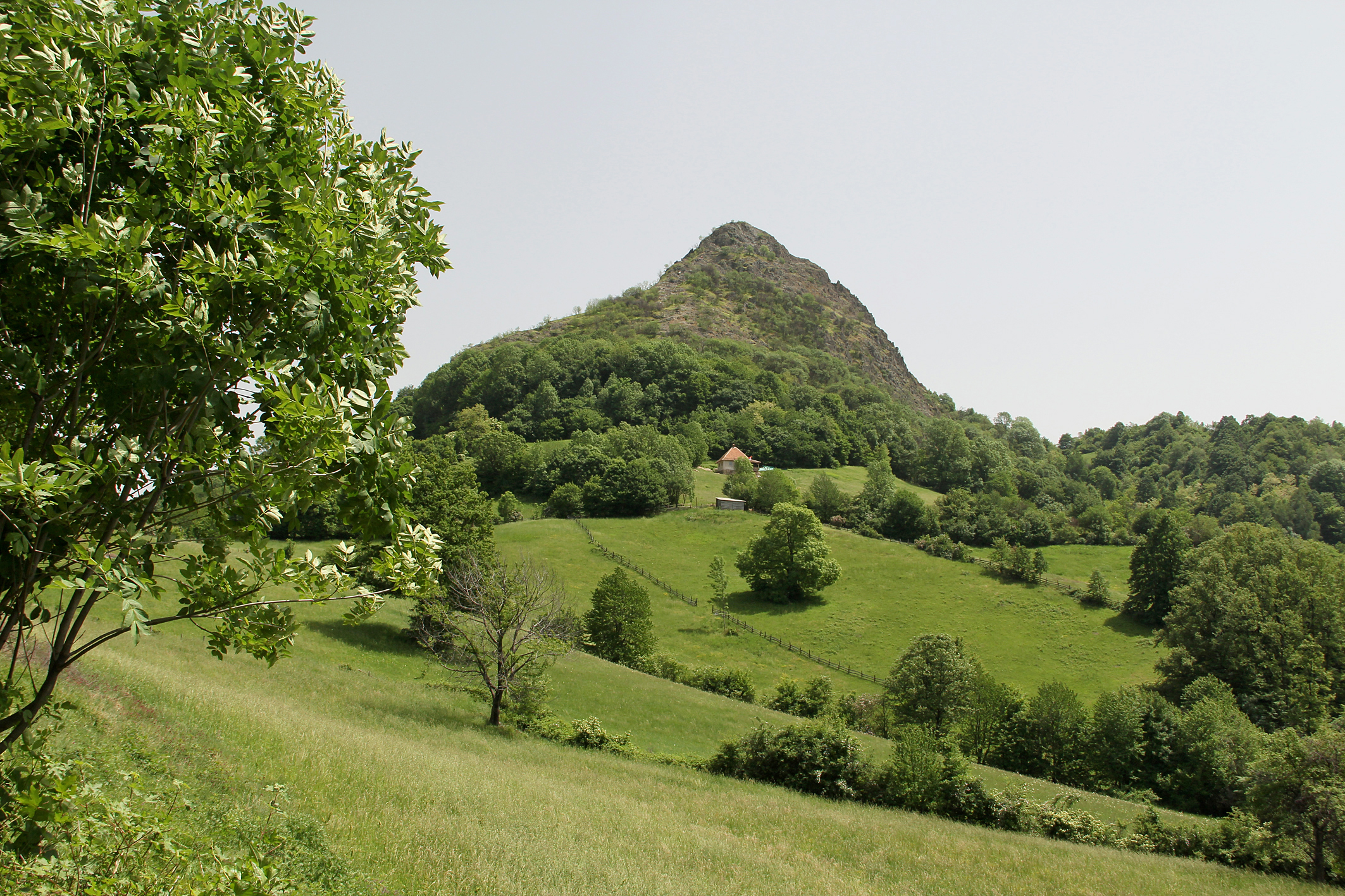
Rudnik

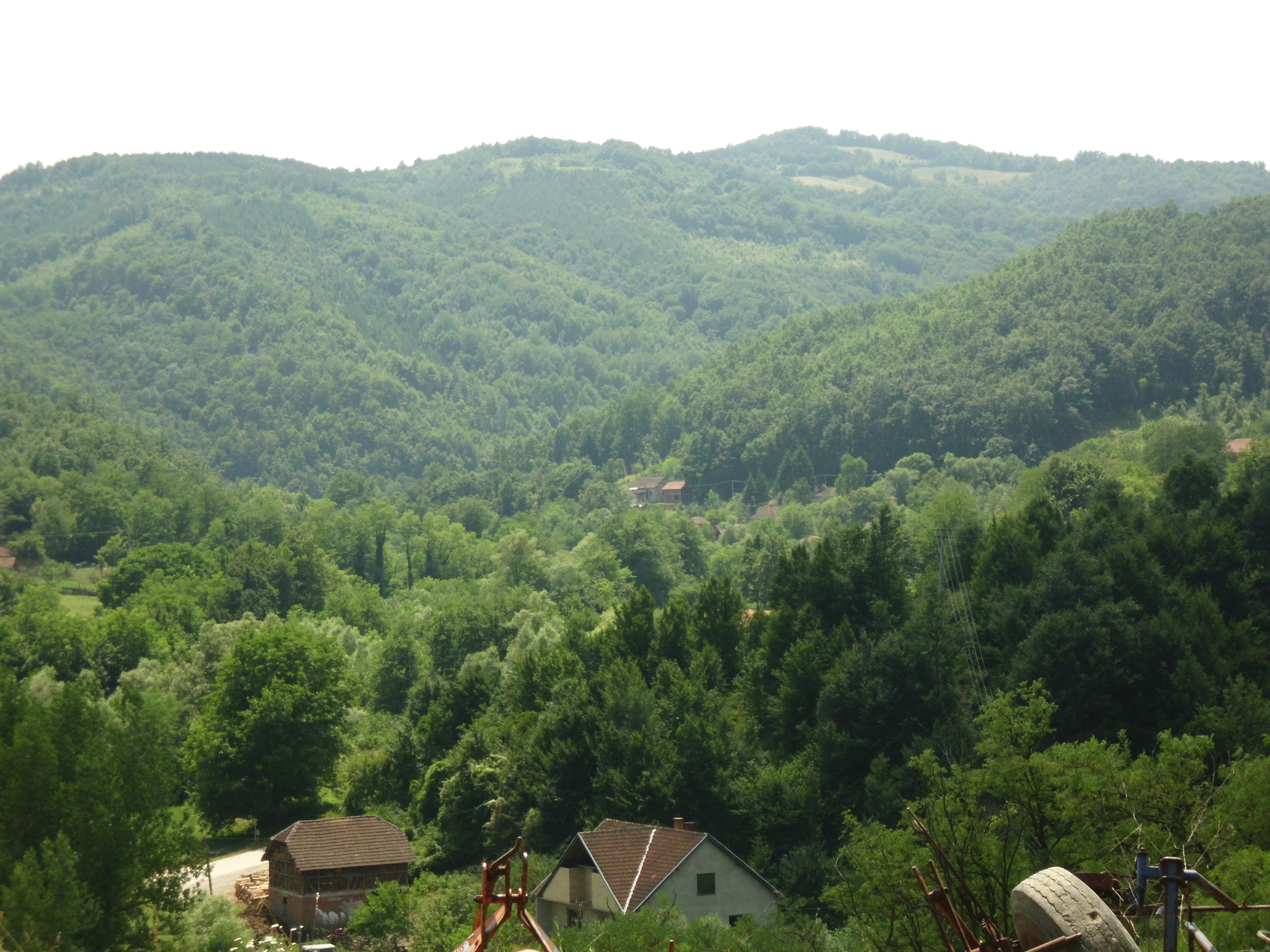
Gledić Mountains

== See also ==
- Šumadija District
- List of regions of Serbia
