= Palanka, Brčko =

Palanka
- Village
- Location within Bosnia and Herzegovina
- Coordinates: 44.8004594°N 18.7248013°E
- Country: Bosnia and Herzegovina
- Entity: Brčko District

Area
  - Total: 2.90 sq mi (7.52 km^{2})

Population (2013)
  - Total: 1,439
  - Density: 496/sq mi (191/km^{2})
- Time zone: UTC+1 (CET)
  - Summer (DST): UTC+2 (CEST)

Palanka is a village in the municipality of Brčko, Bosnia and Herzegovina.

== Demographics ==
According to the 2013 census, its population was 1,439.

Ethnicity in 2013
Ethnicity	Number	Percentage
Bosniaks	1,429	99.3%
other/undeclared	10	0.7%
Total	1,439	100%
