= Knić =

Knić Кнић (Serbian)
- Town and municipality
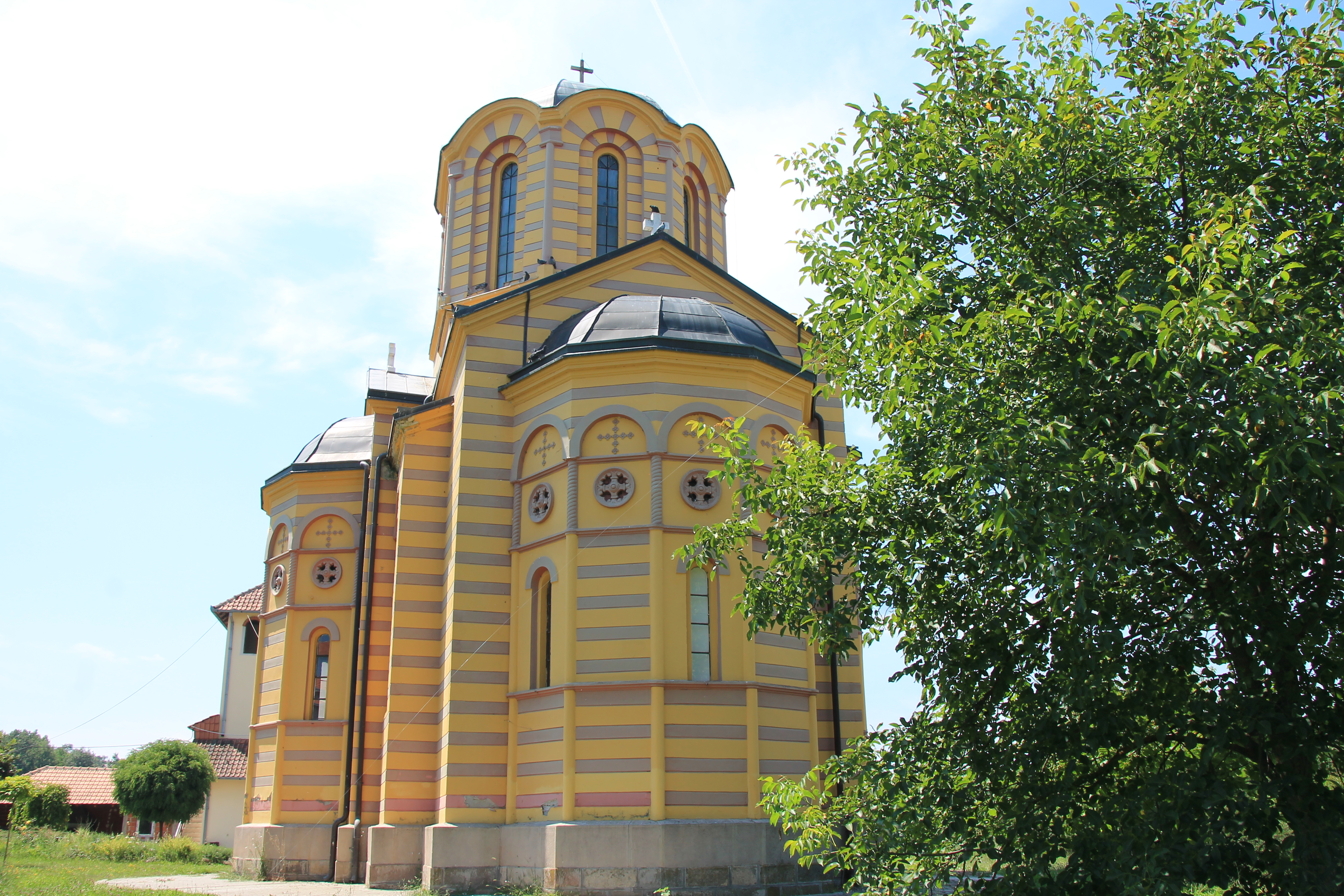
- Church of Saint Elijah in Knić

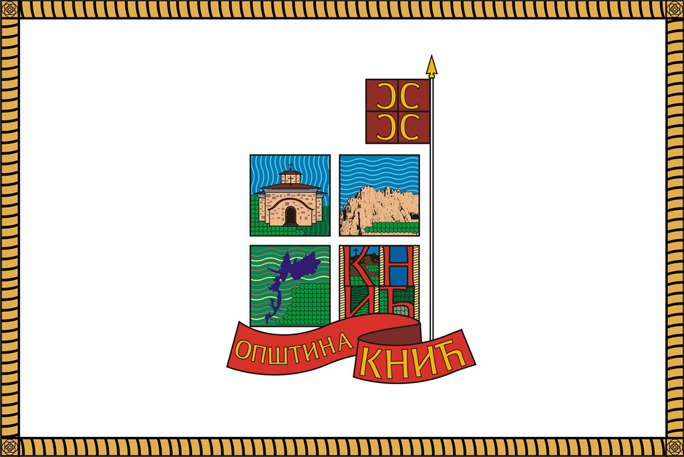
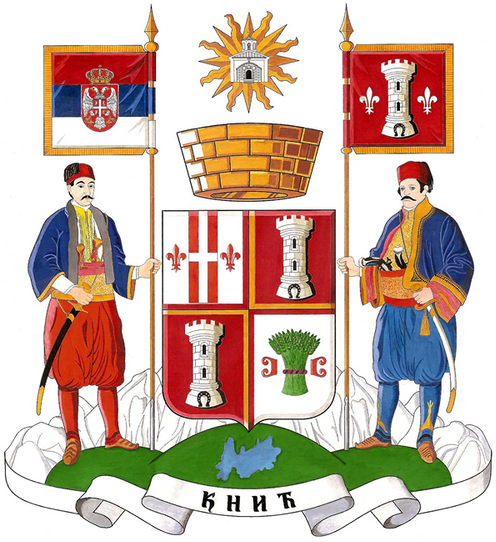
- Flag Coat of arms

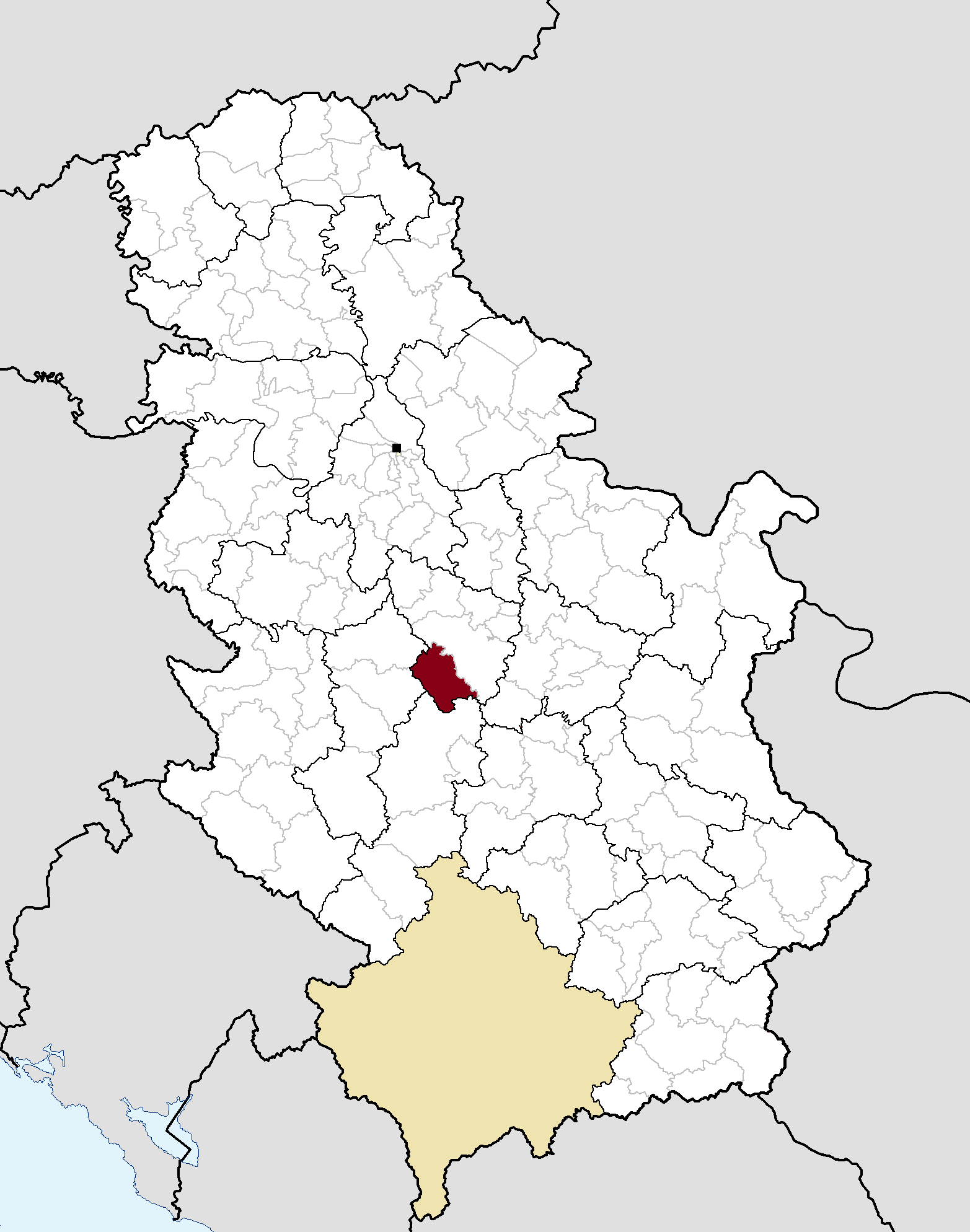
- Location of the municipality of Knić within Serbia
- Coordinates: 43°55′35″N 20°43′10″E
- Country: Serbia
- Region: Šumadija and Western Serbia
- District: Šumadija
- Settlements: 36

Government
  - Mayor: Srećko Ilić (SNS)

Area
  - Village: 27.19 km^{2} (10.50 sq mi)
  - Municipality: 413 km^{2} (159 sq mi)
- Elevation: 320 m (1,050 ft)

Population (2022 census)
  - Town: 1,942
  - Town density: 71.42/km^{2} (185.0/sq mi)
  - Municipality: 11,729
  - Municipality density: 28.4/km^{2} (73.6/sq mi)
- Time zone: UTC+1 (CET)
  - Summer (DST): UTC+2 (CEST)
- Postal code: 34240
- Area code: +381(0)34
- Car plates: KG
- Website: www.knic.rs

Knić (Serbian Cyrillic: Кнић) is a village and municipality located in the Šumadija District of central Serbia. According to 2022 census, the population of the town is 1,942, while population of the municipality is 11,729.

== History ==
Rocky hills above the village of Borač, about 10 km northwest of Knić, have been inhabited for thousands of years. The first fort was built by the Romans, who used it as an observation post of an important Roman road. A medieval Serbian town was located here for several centuries, reaching its peak at the time of Stefan Lazarević. The remains of Borač Fortress are protected as a cultural monument of great importance.

Kamenac Monastery in Knić municipality dates back from the early 15th century. It was renovated multiple times, including 1547 and 1700. The monastery was heavily damaged during battles against the Ottomans in the early 19th century and furnished with new paintings and iconostasis in 1870.

== Settlements ==
Aside from the town of Knić, the municipality includes the following settlements:

- Bajčetina
- Balosave
- Bare
- Bečevica
- Borač
- Brestovac
- Brnjica
- Bumbarevo Brdo
- Vrbeta
- Vučkovica
- Grabovac
- Grivac
- Gruža
- Guncati
- Dragušica
- Dubrava
- Žunje
- Zabojnica
- Kikojevac
- Kneževac
- Konjuša
- Kusovac
- Lipnica
- Ljuljaci
- Oplanić
- Pretoke

== Demographics ==
Historical population
Year	Pop.	±% p.a.
1948	28,380	—
1953	26,982	−1.01%
1961	25,599	−0.66%
1971	23,192	−0.98%
1981	20,965	−1.00%
1991	18,724	−1.12%
2002	16,148	−1.34%
2011	14,237	−1.39%
2022	11,729	−1.75%

As of 2011 census, the municipality had 14,237 inhabitants.

=== Ethnic groups ===
The ethnic composition of the municipality:

Ethnic group	Population	%
Serbs	14,081	98.90%
Montenegrins	22	0.15%
Croats	9	0.06%
Yugoslavs	5	0.04%
Macedonians	5	0.04%
Hungarians	4	0.03%
Others	111	0.78%
Total	14,205	

== Economy ==
The following table gives a preview of total number of registered people employed in legal entities per their core activity (as of 2018):

Activity	Total
Agriculture, forestry and fishing	14
Mining and quarrying	-
Manufacturing	565
Electricity, gas, steam and air conditioning supply	25
Water supply; sewerage, waste management and remediation activities	42
Construction	30
Wholesale and retail trade, repair of motor vehicles and motorcycles	288
Transportation and storage	115
Accommodation and food services	80
Information and communication	11
Financial and insurance activities	2
Real estate activities	-
Professional, scientific and technical activities	56
Administrative and support service activities	7
Public administration and defense; compulsory social security	162
Education	178
Human health and social work activities	113
Arts, entertainment and recreation	14
Other service activities	53
Individual agricultural workers	482
Total	2,237

== Famous residents ==
- Stevan Knićanin, a commander of the Serbian volunteer squads in the Serbian Vojvodina during the 1848/1849 revolution.
