= Šumadija District =

Administrative district of Serbia

Šumadija District Шумадијски округ
- Administrative district of Serbia
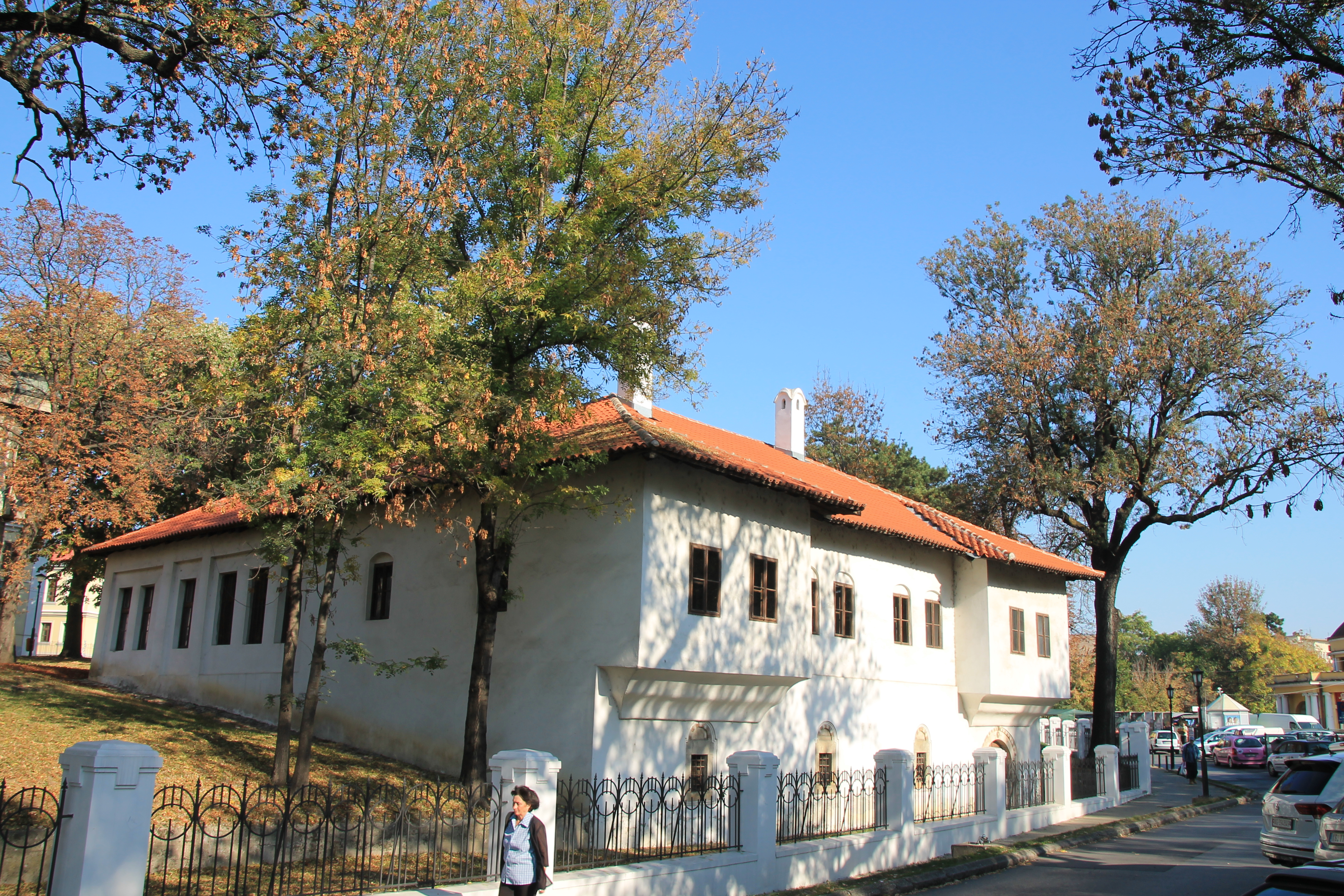
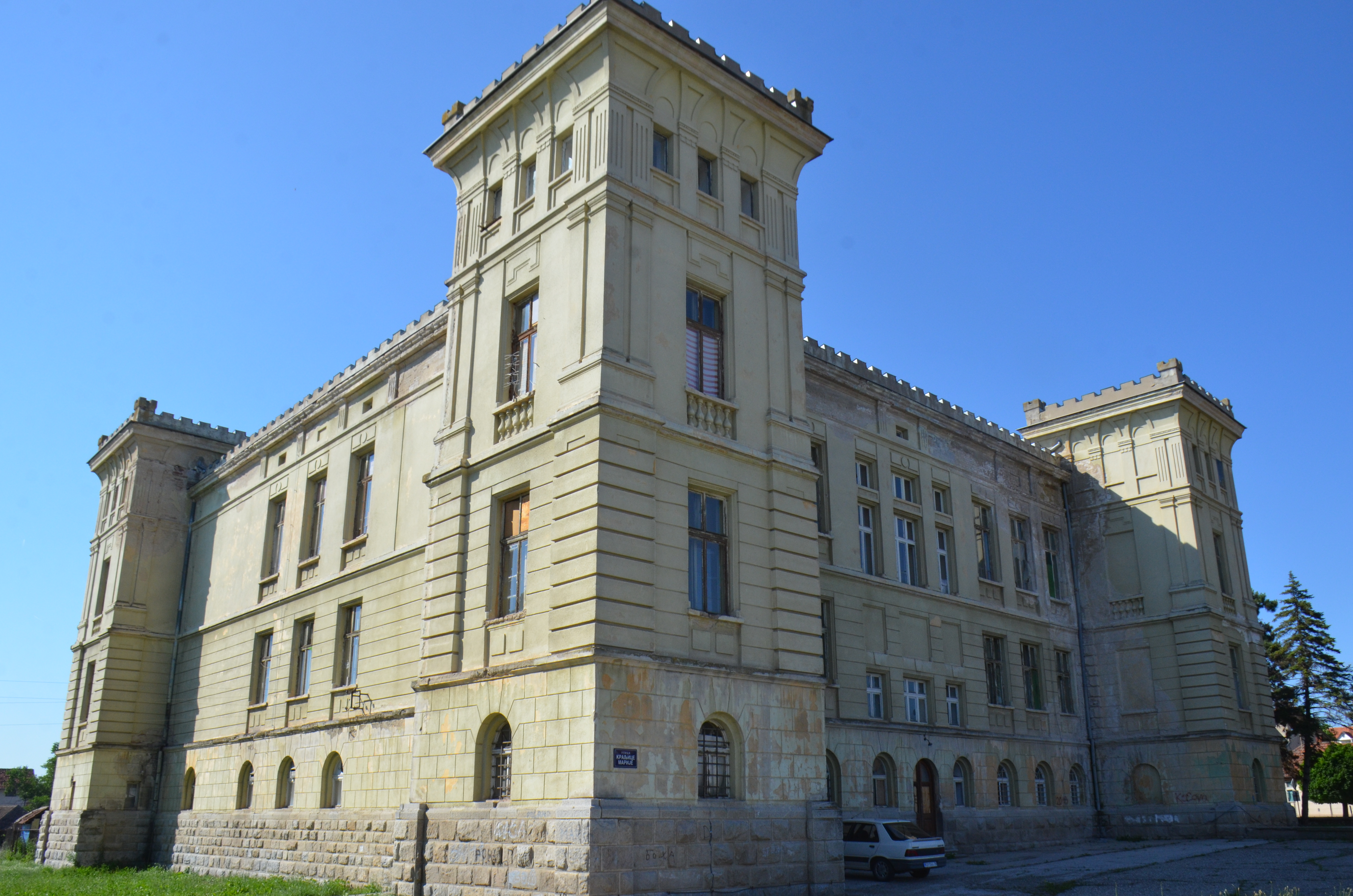
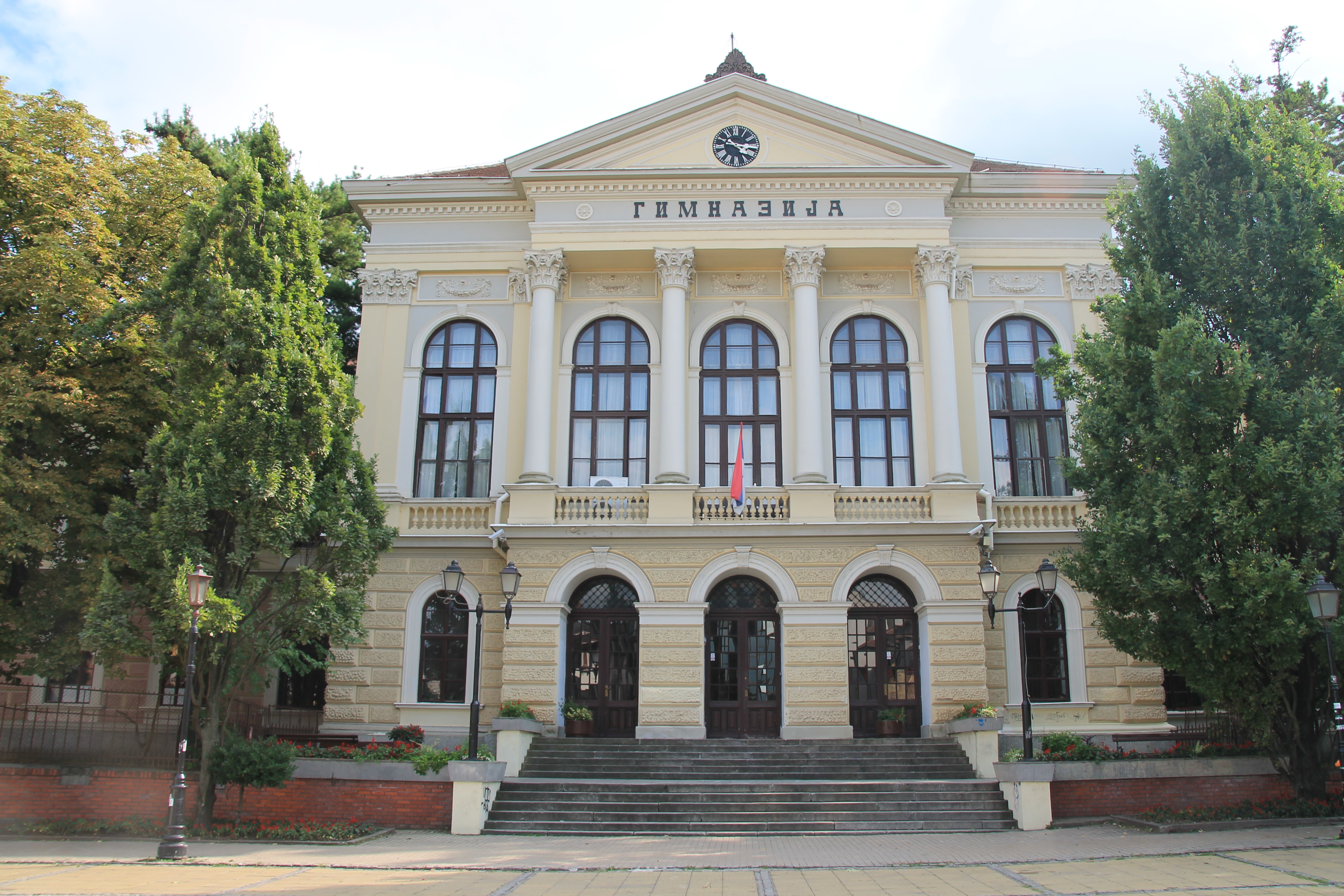
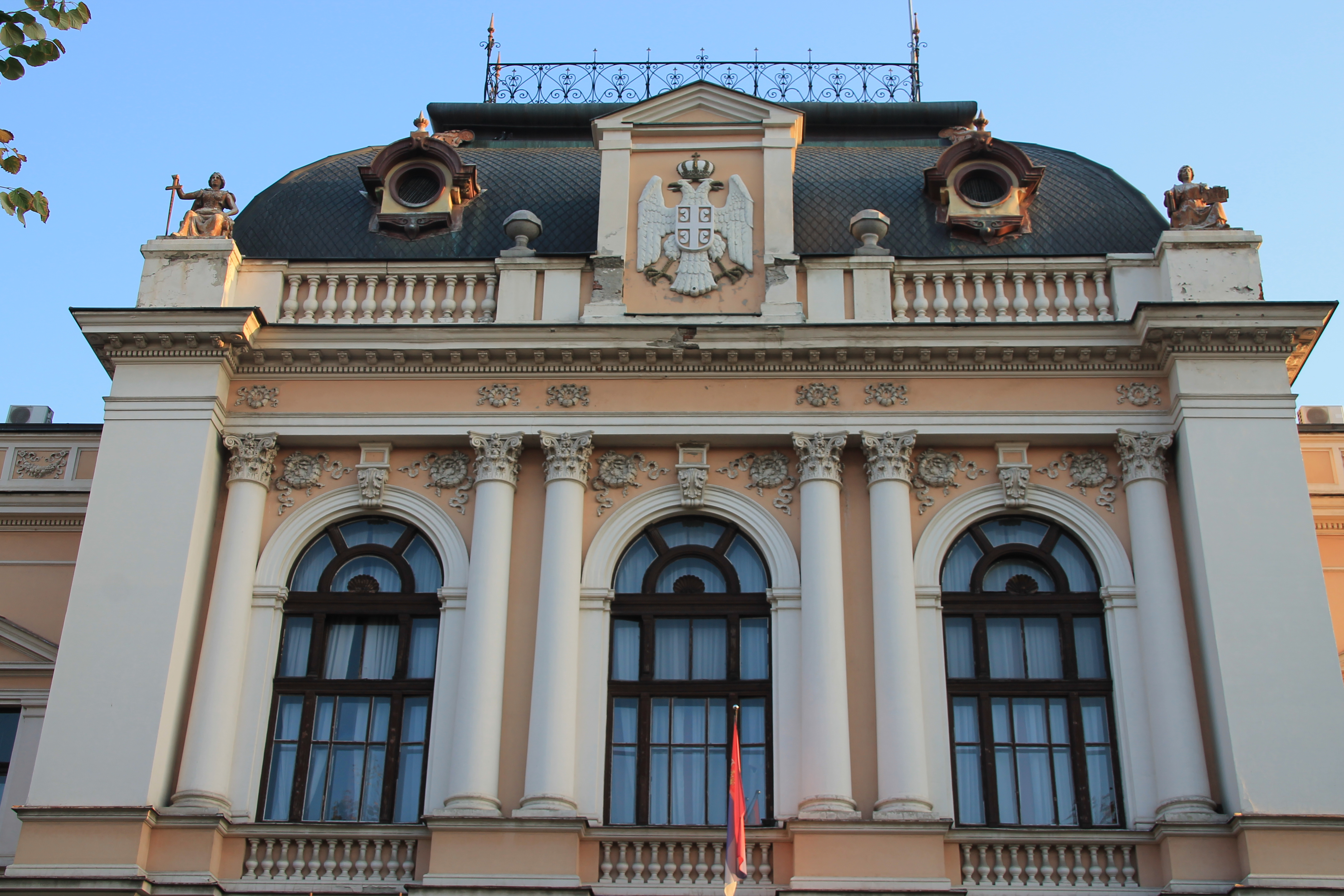
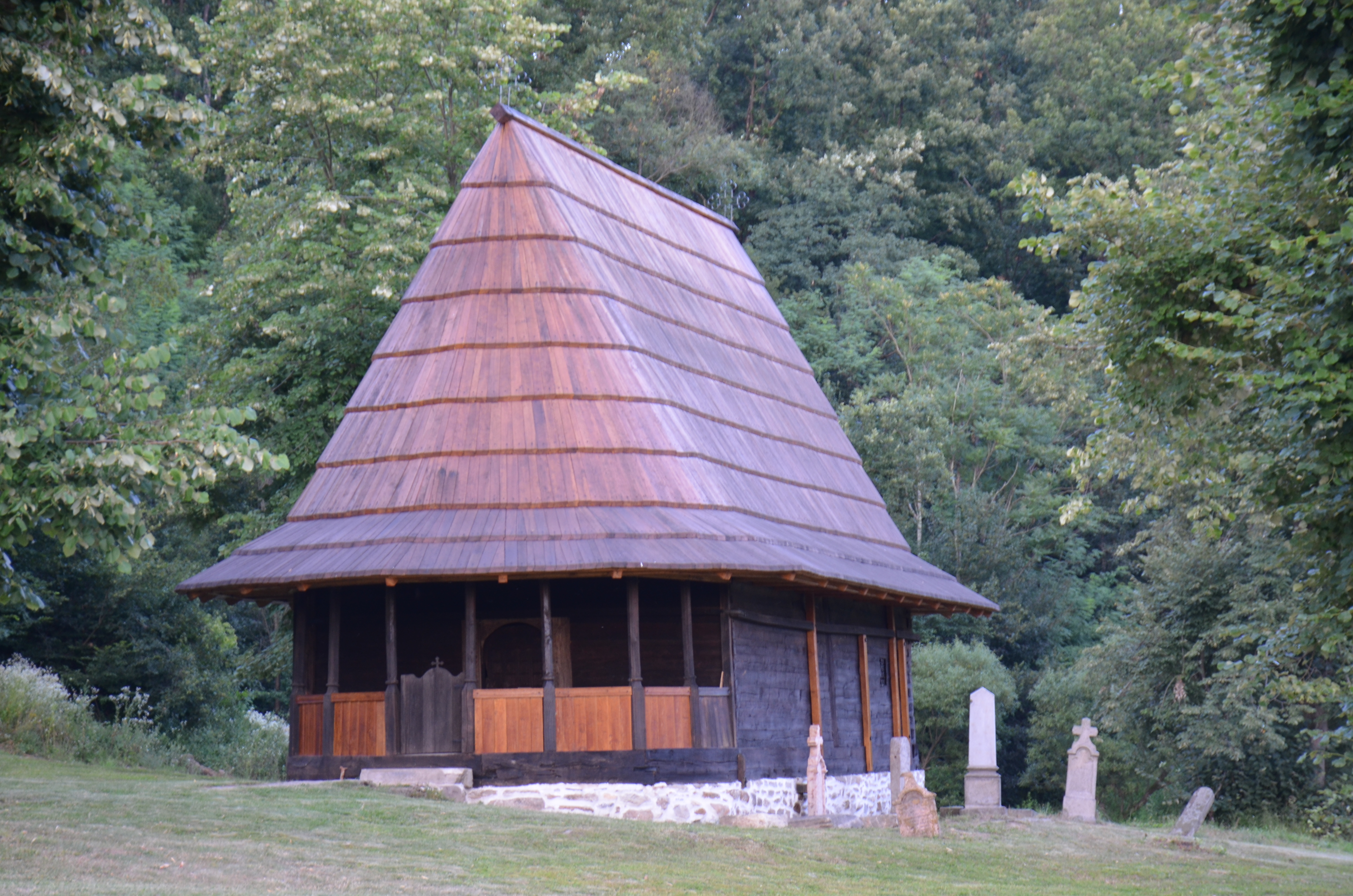
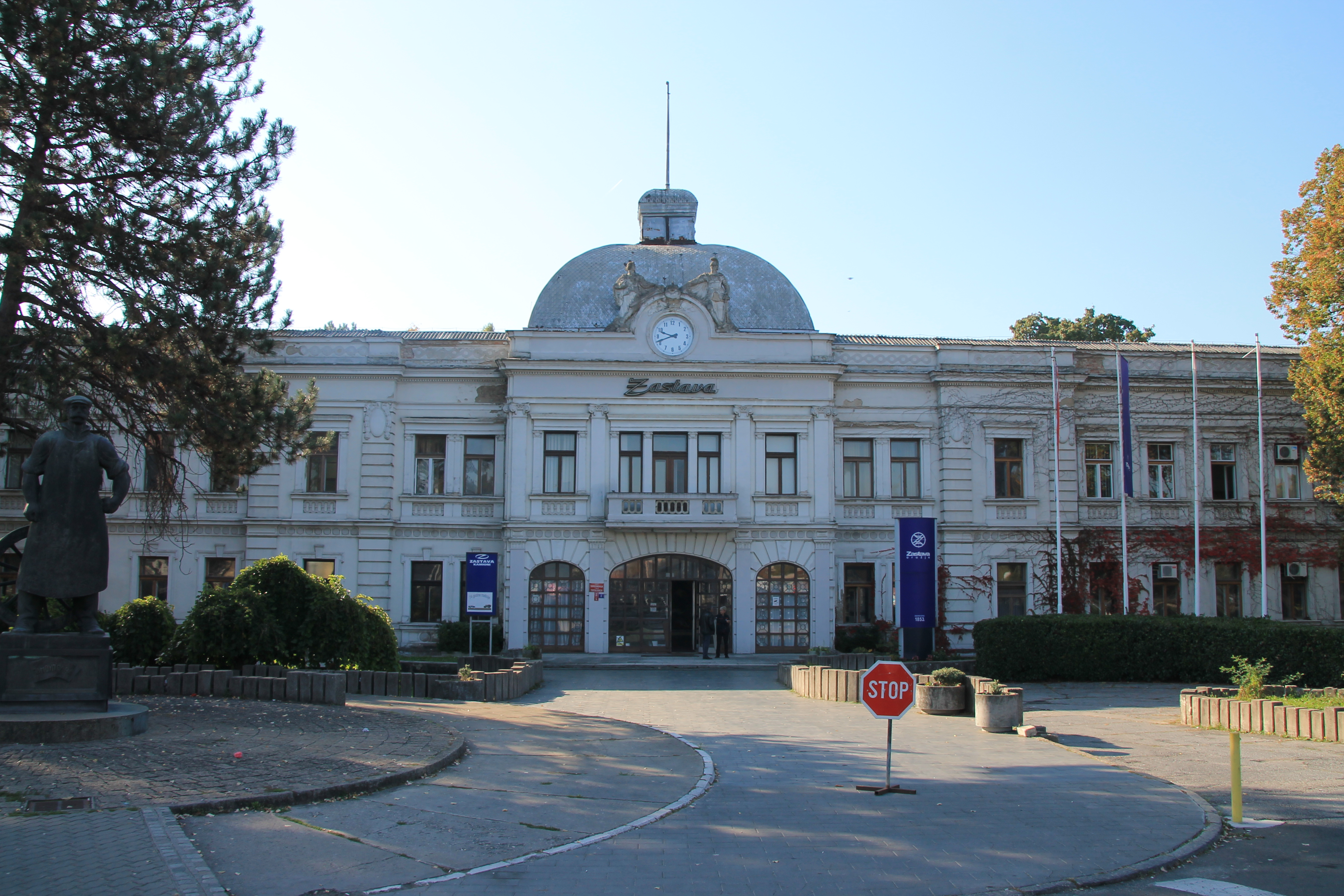
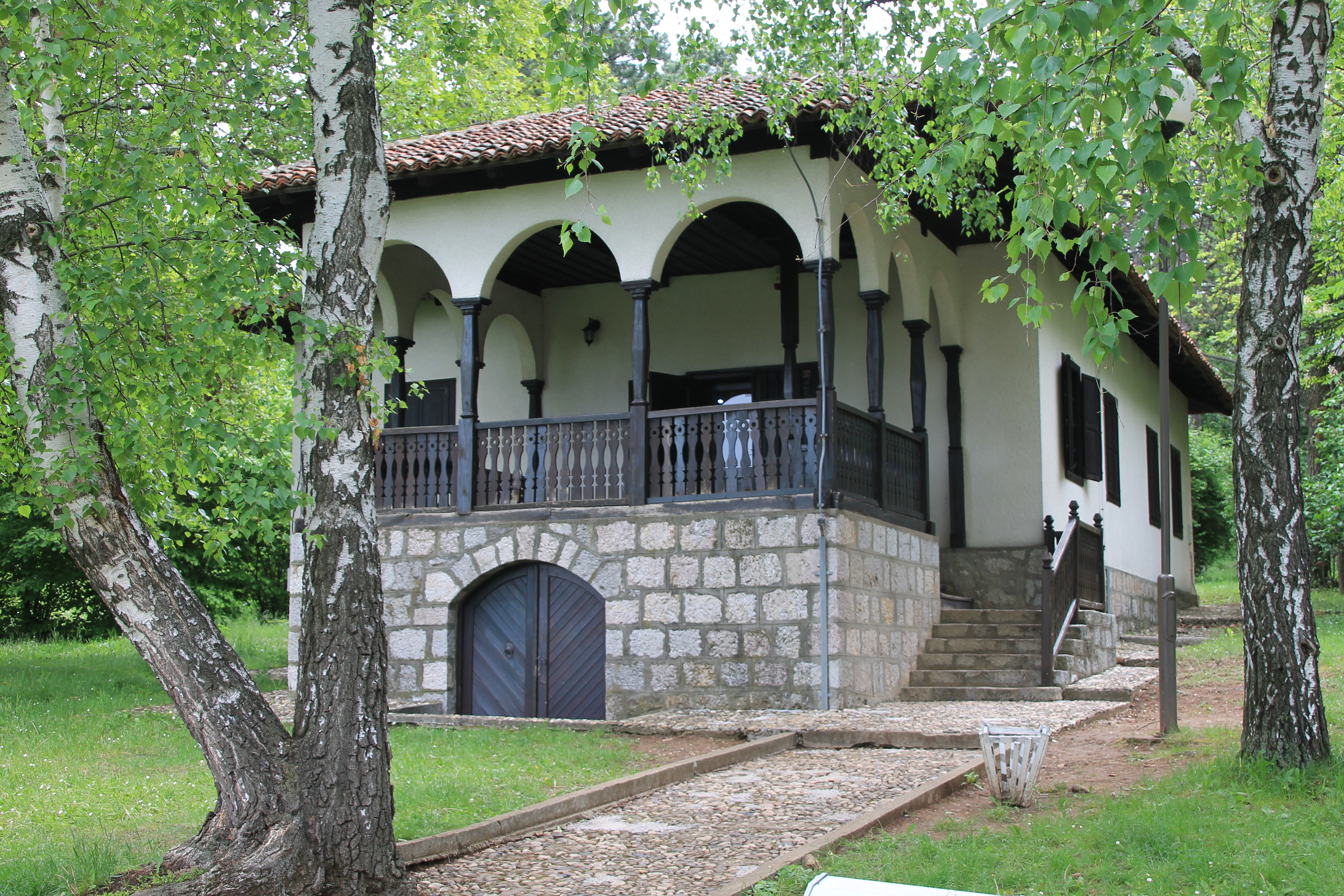
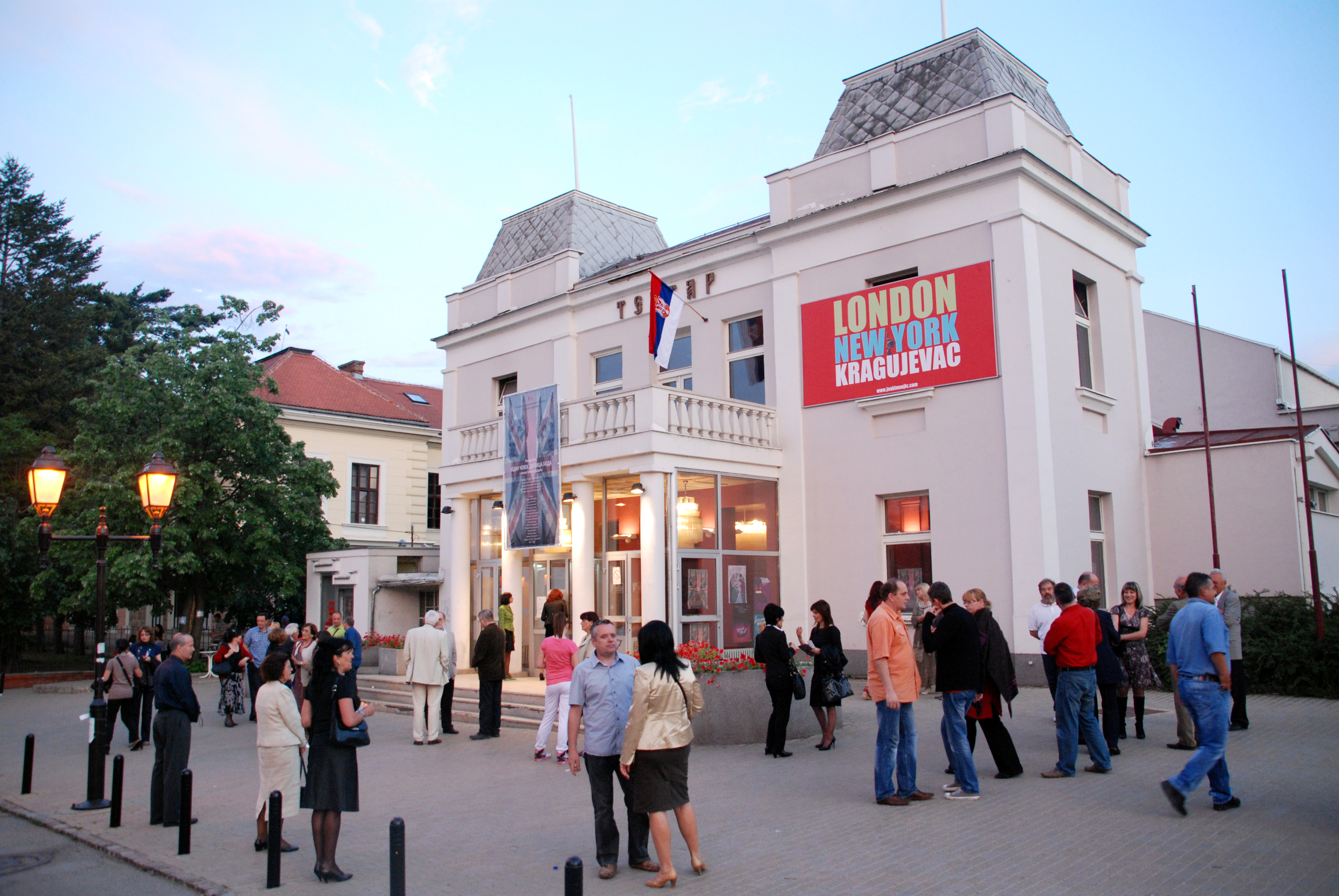
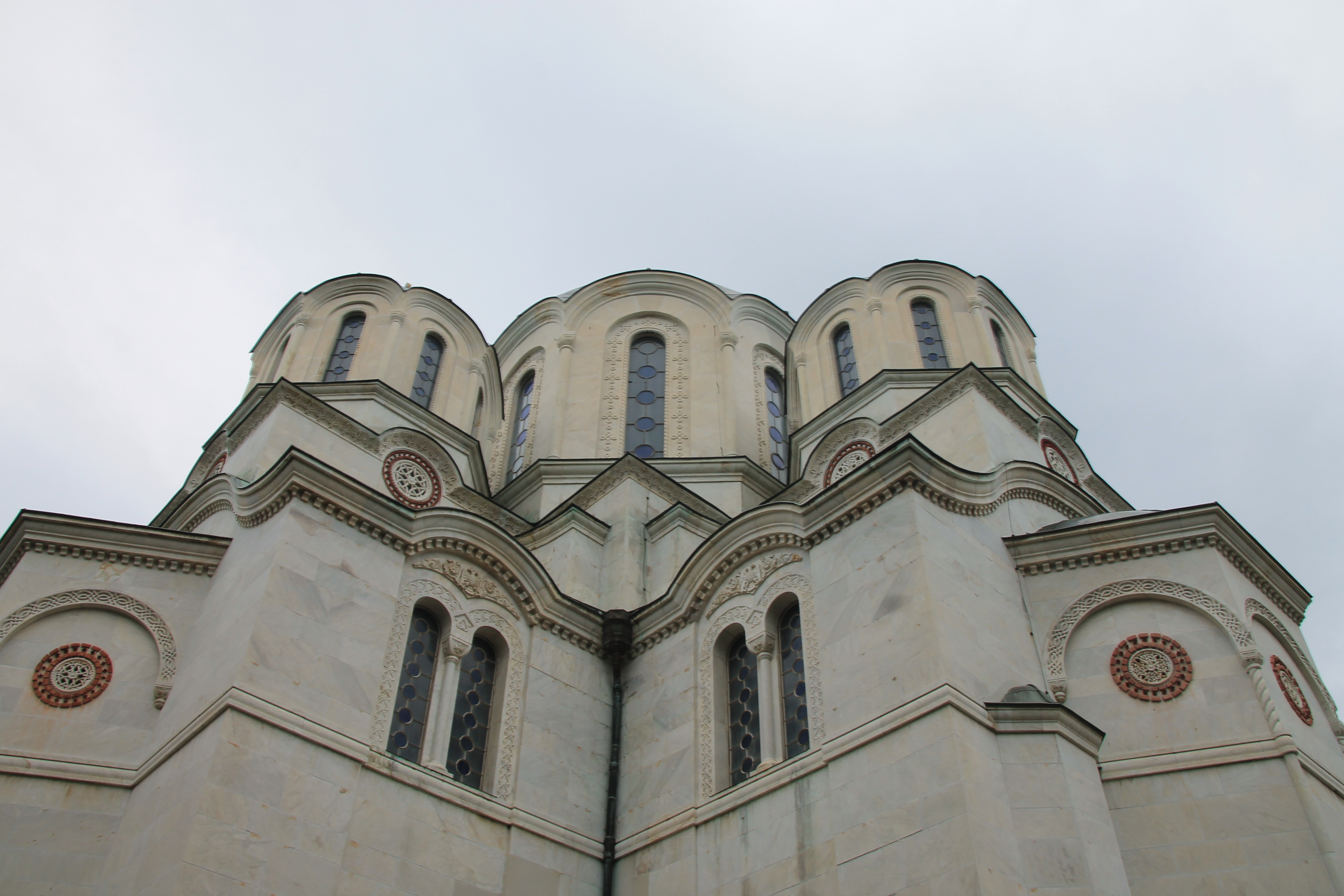
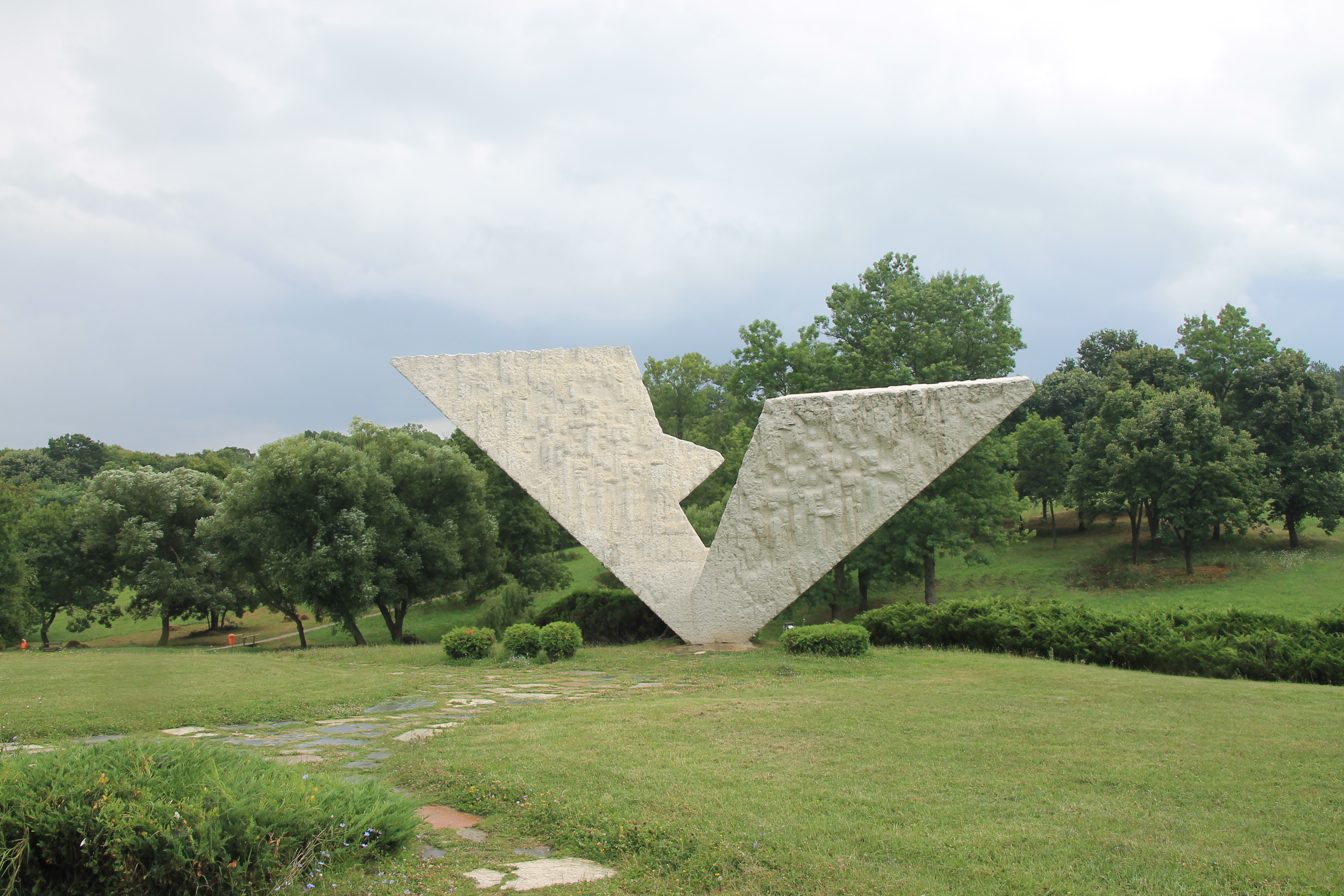
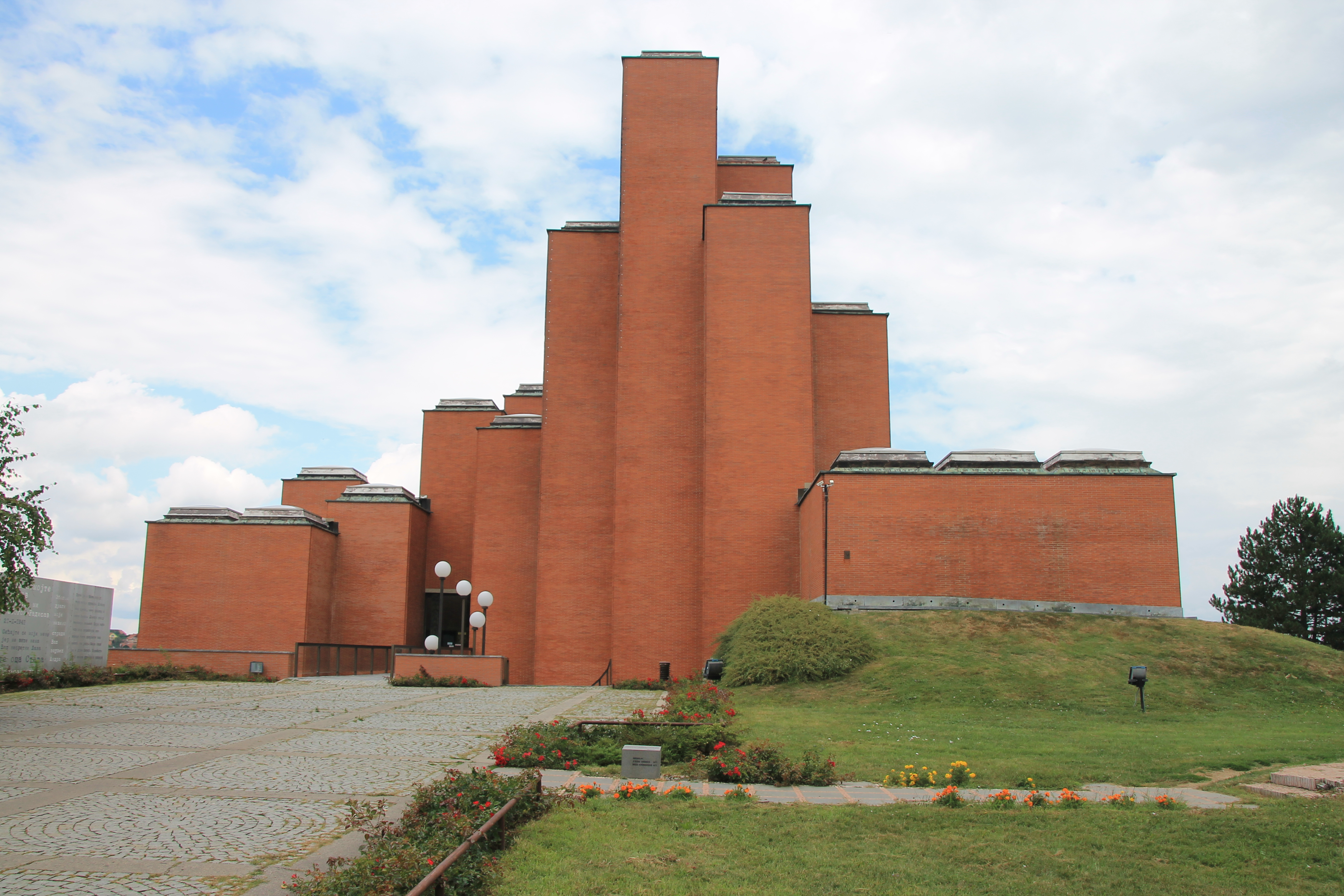
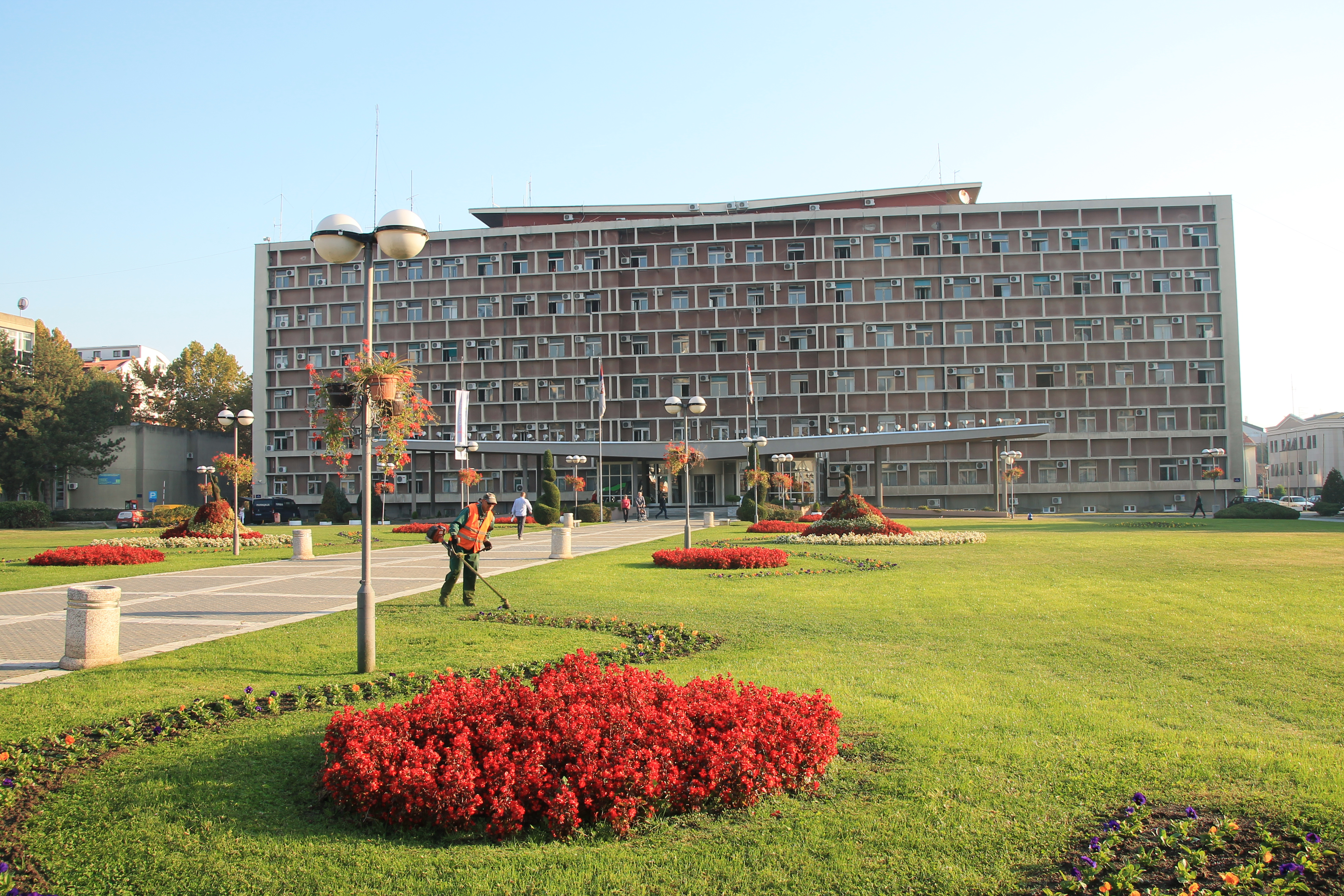
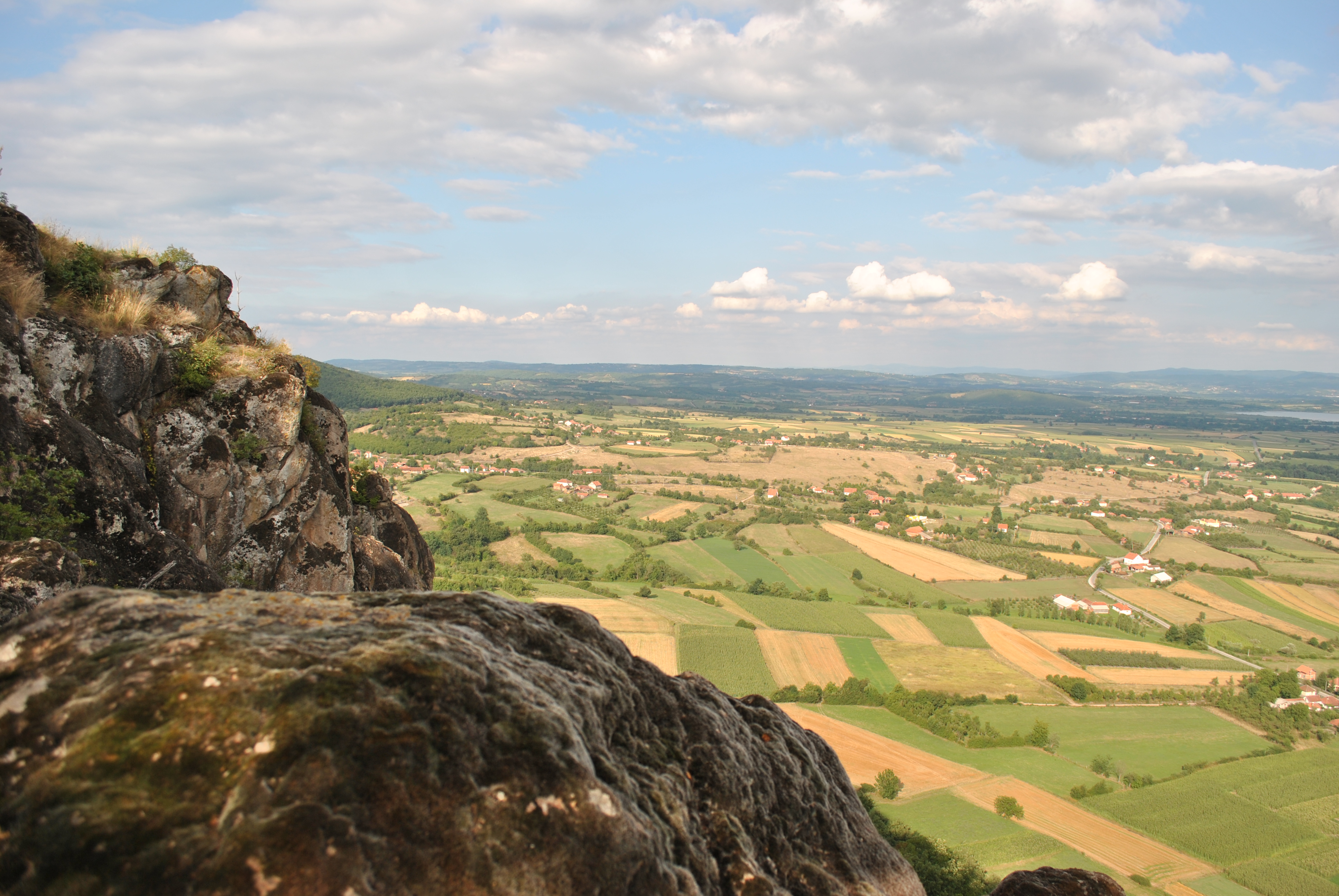
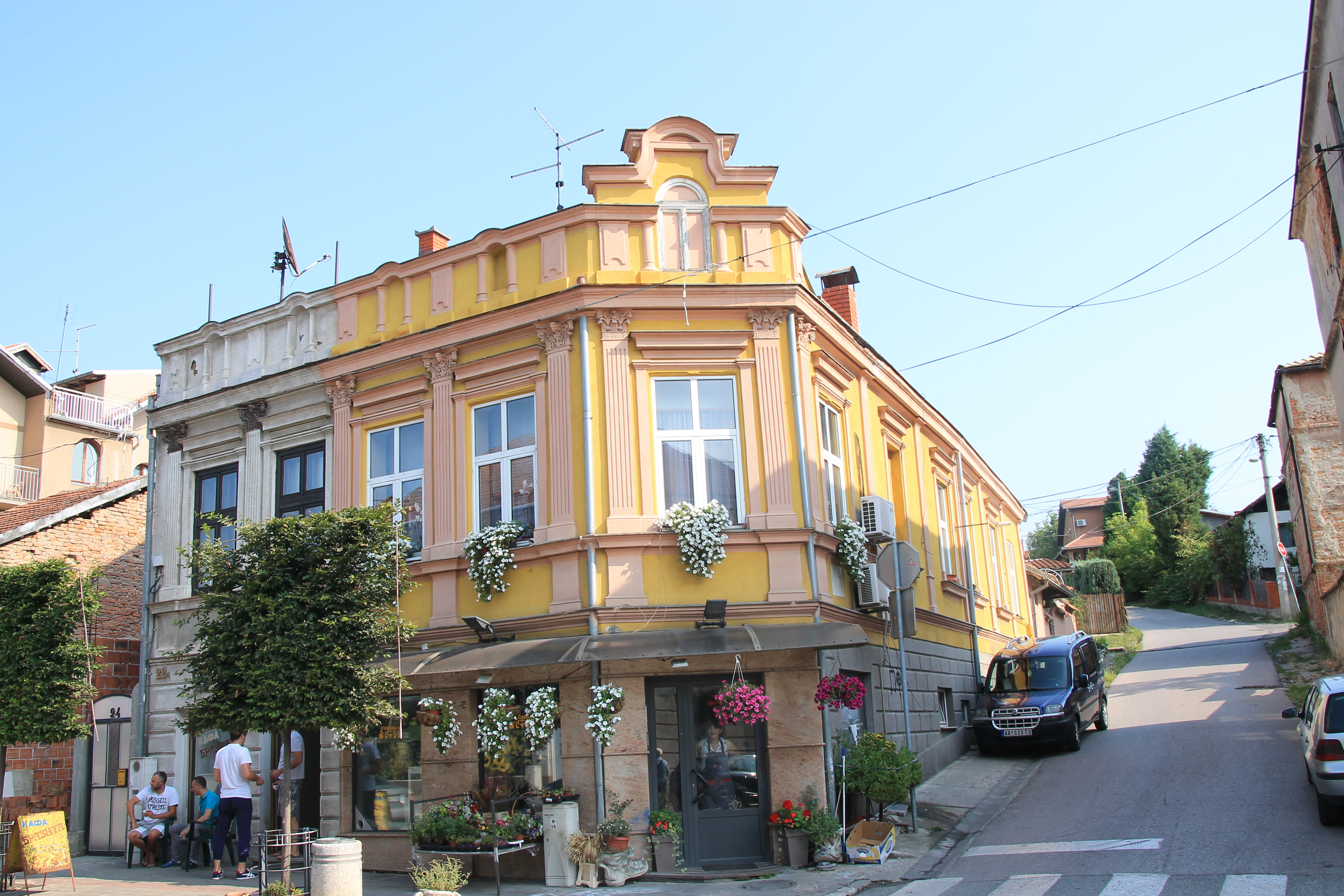
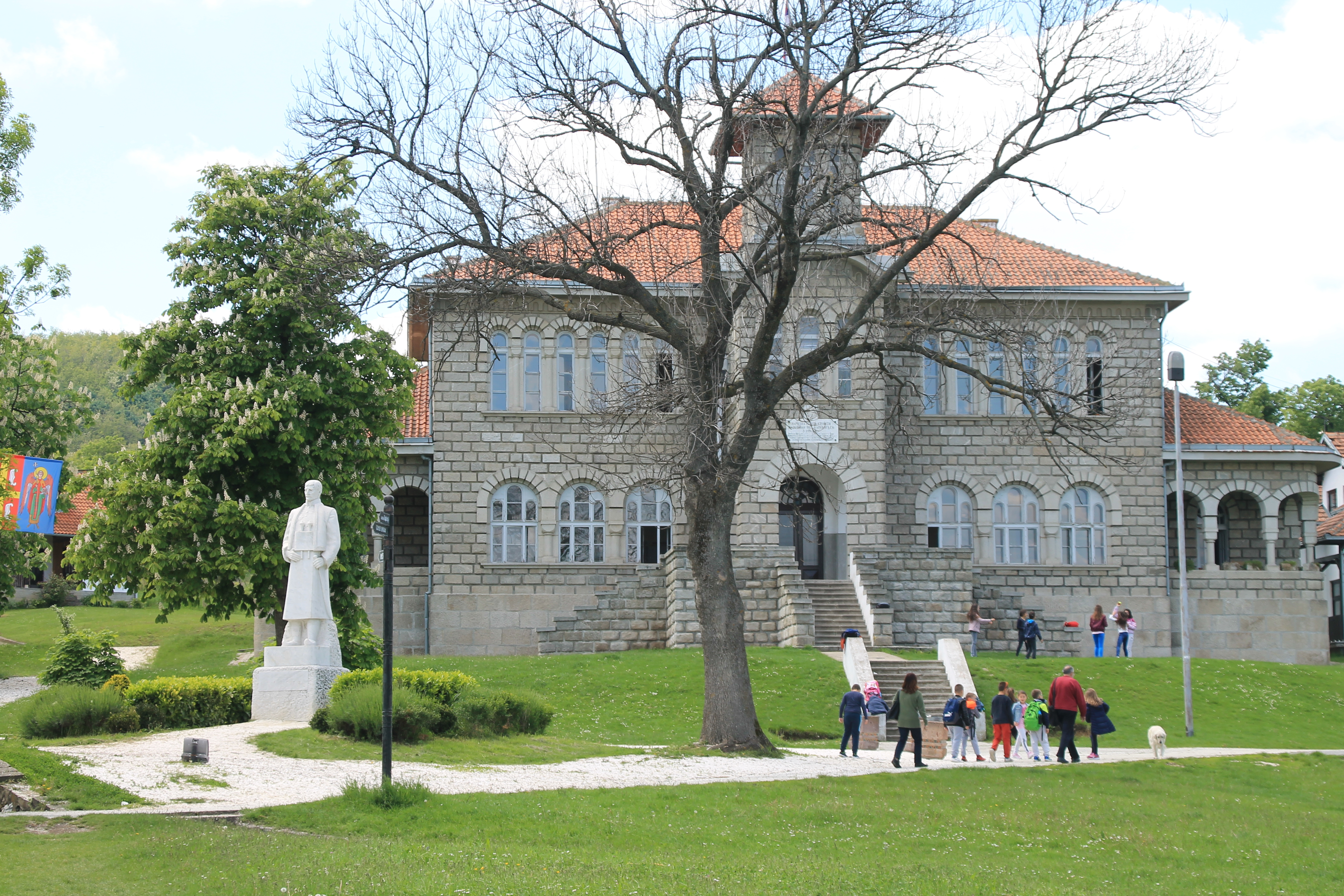
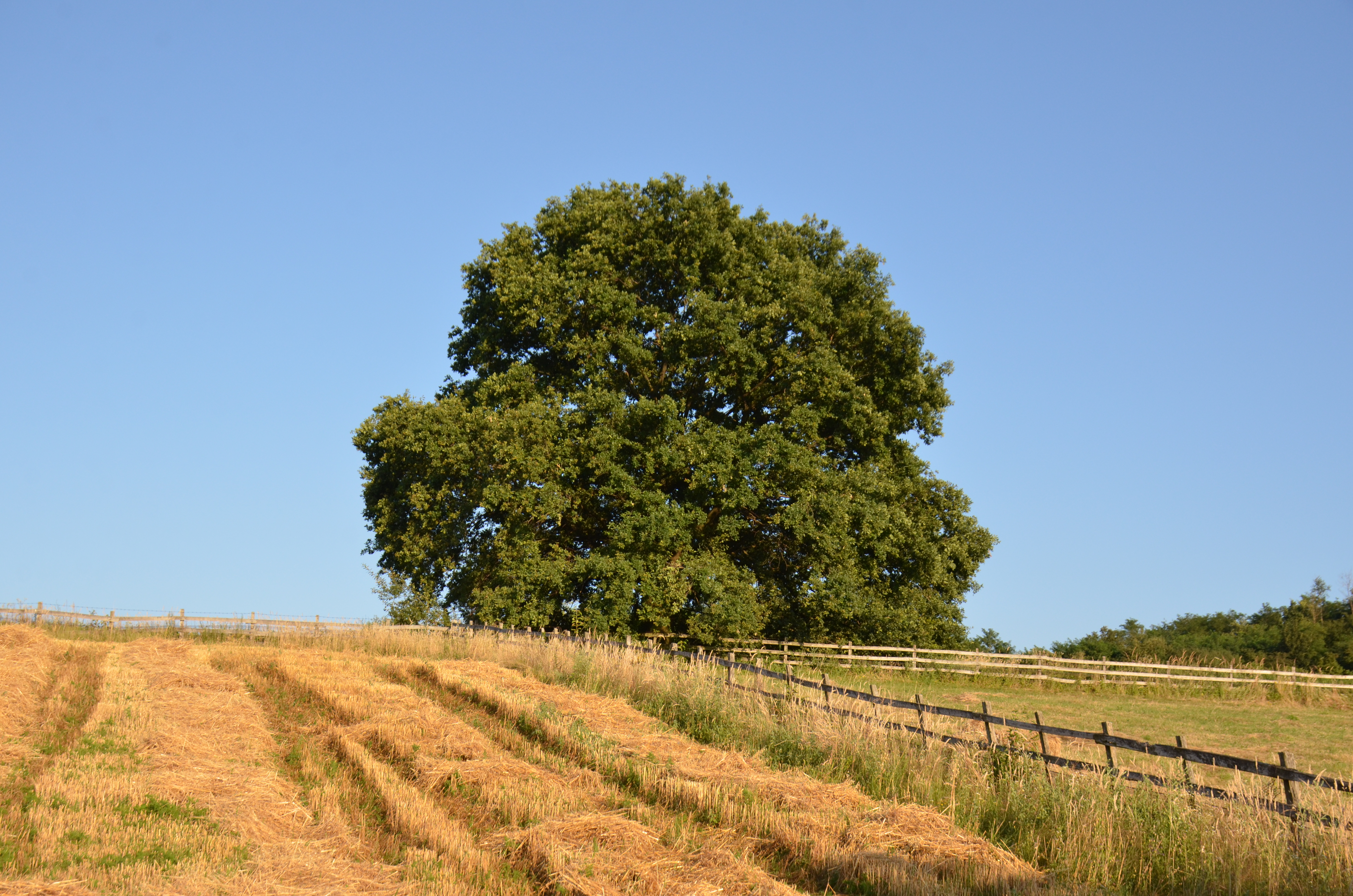
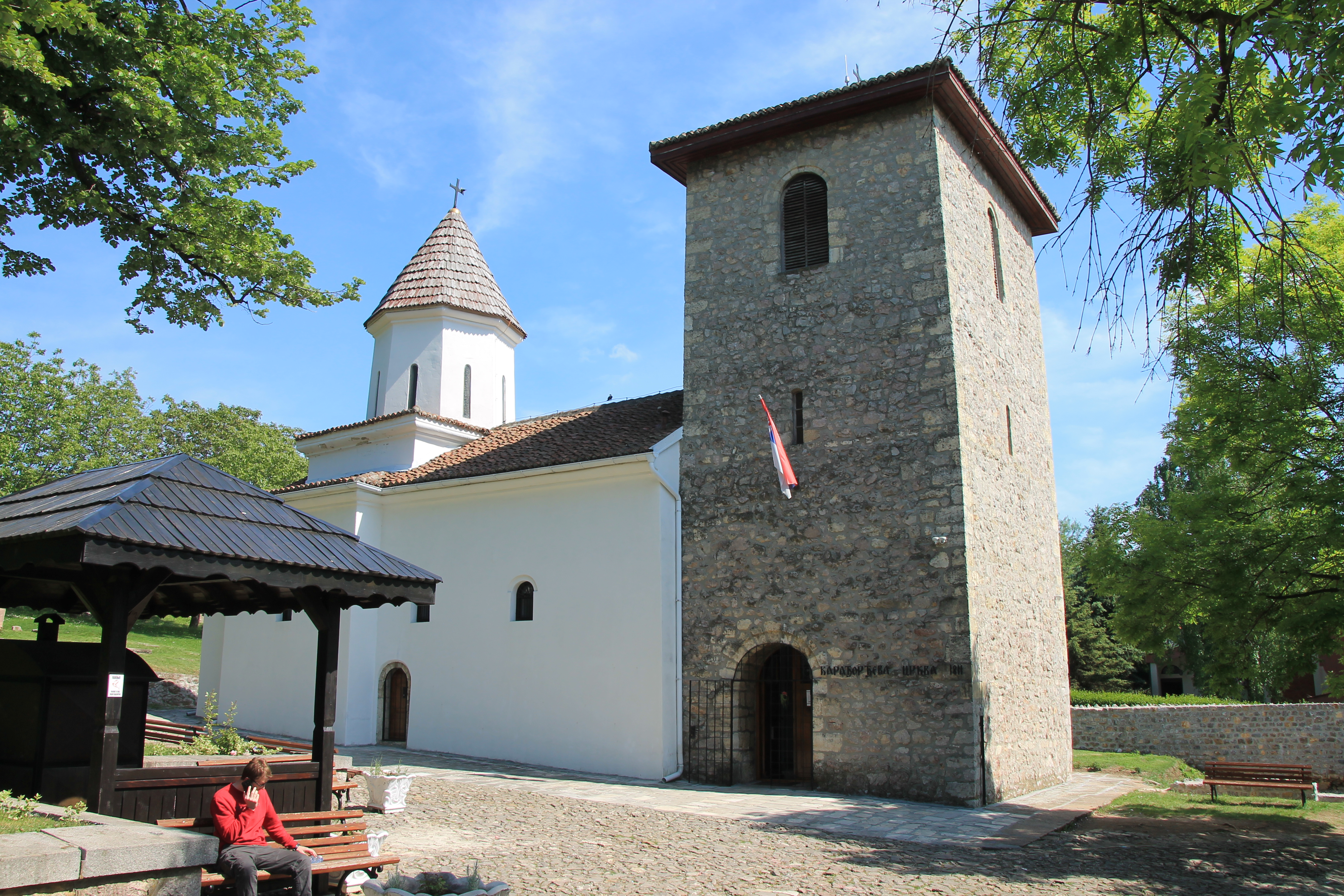
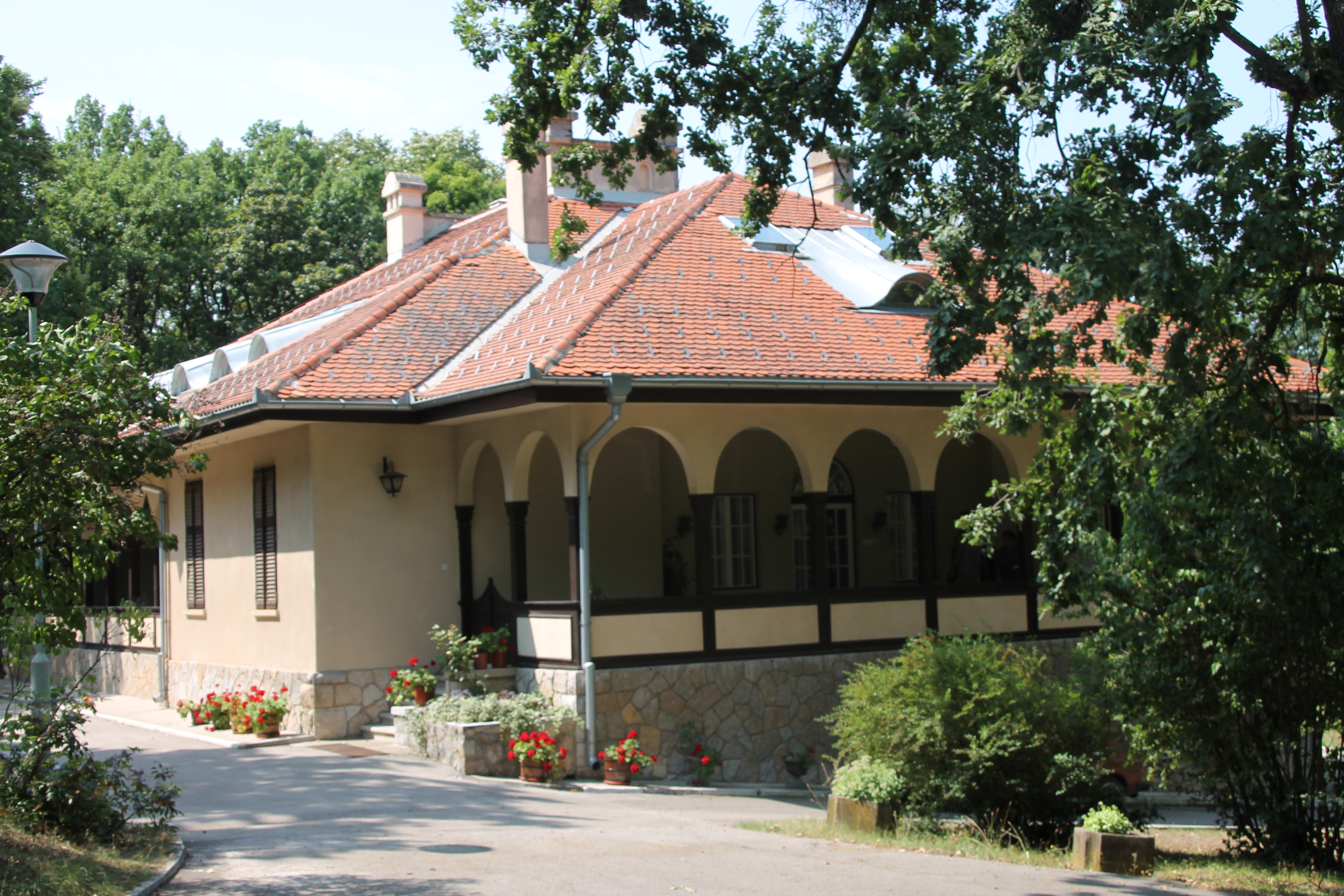
- Images from the Šumadija District

- Location of district in Serbia
- Coordinates: 43°59′N 20°53′E
- Country: Serbia
- Administrative center: Kragujevac

Government
  - Commissioner: Biljana Ilić Stošić (SNS)

Area
  - Total: 2,387 km^{2} (922 sq mi)

Population (2022)
  - Total: 269,728
  - Density: 113.0/km^{2} (292.7/sq mi)
- ISO 3166 code: RS-12
- Municipalities: 6 and 1 city
- Settlements: 174
- Cities and towns: 5
- Villages: 169
- Website: sumadijski.okrug.gov.rs

The Šumadija District (Serbian: Шумадијски округ, romanized: Šumadijski okrug, pronounced [ʃumǎdijskiː ôkruːɡ]) is one of administrative districts of Serbia. It is located in the geographical region of Šumadija. According to the 2022 census, it has a population of 269,728 inhabitants. The administrative center of the Šumadija District is the city of Kragujevac.

== History ==
The present-day administrative districts (including Šumadija District) were established in 1992 by the decree of the Government of Serbia.

== Cities and municipalities ==
The Šumadija District is divided into one city and six municipalities:

- Kragujevac (city)
- Aranđelovac (municipality)
- Batočina (municipality)
- Knić (municipality)
- Lapovo (municipality)
- Rača (municipality)
- Topola (municipality)

== Demographics ==
Historical population
Year	Pop.	±% p.a.
1948	216,533	—
1953	227,929	+1.03%
1961	241,047	+0.70%
1971	264,344	+0.93%
1981	301,354	+1.32%
1991	312,160	+0.35%
2002	298,778	−0.40%
2011	293,308	−0.21%
2022	269,728	−0.76%

=== Towns ===
There are two towns with over 10,000 inhabitants:

- Kragujevac: 146,315
- Aranđelovac: 22,881

=== Ethnic structure ===
Ethnicity	Population	Share
Serbs	252,494	93.6%
Roma	1,956	0.7%
Others	2,472	1%
Undeclared/Unknown	12,806	4.7%

== See also ==
- Administrative districts of Serbia
- Administrative divisions of Serbia
