= Auxiliary bishop =

High-ranking member of the Christian clergy

An auxiliary bishop is a Catholic or Eastern Orthodox bishop assigned to assist a diocesan bishop in meeting the pastoral and administrative needs of the diocese. Auxiliary bishops can also be titular bishops of sees that no longer exist as territorial jurisdictions.

== Roman Catholicism ==
=== History ===
The history of the auxiliary bishop in the Catholic Church starts in the 6th century in Christian North Africa. At that time, the invasion of North Africa by Muslim Arab armies forced the bishops in that region to flee to Rome. The Catholic Church did not want to acknowledge that these dioceses had been permanently lost, so the popes kept reappointing their bishops. Over the centuries, these exiled bishops lived out their tenures in Rome, receiving financial support from the Vatican without exercising any real responsibilities. By the 15th century, the popes started assigning the bishops on a temporary basis to vacant dioceses in Europe.

In the 16th century, Pope Pius V decreed that these auxiliary bishops could only be assigned to dioceses run by cardinals or archbishops. The dioceses were required to provide financial support for these clerics, freeing the Vatican from responsibility for their upkeep.

The Second Vatican Council (1963-65) revived the role of auxiliary bishops, stating that "rightly", auxiliary bishops should be appointed where "the diocesan bishop cannot personally fulfill all his episcopal duties as the good of souls demands, either because of the vast extent of the diocese or the great number of its inhabitants, or because of the special nature of the apostolate or other reasons of a different nature". Auxiliary and coadjutor bishops were to be granted "those faculties necessary for rendering their work more effective and safeguarding the dignity proper to bishops ... without detriment to the unity of the diocesan administration and the authority of the diocesan bishop.

=== Functions ===
In the Catholic Church, auxiliary bishops serve in a diocese under the authority of the diocesan bishop. However, the auxiliary bishops are fully consecrated, the same as the bishop, with the abilities to perform all the church sacraments and masses.

The bishop assigns the roles and duties of the auxiliary bishop. In many dioceses, the auxiliary bishop serves as the vicar general or episcopal vicar, both top administrative posts. Larger dioceses may have several auxiliary bishops, assigned as administrators of vicariates, deaneries or geographic regions. Auxiliary bishops are frequently appointed to minister to a particular ethnic group within the diocese. Auxiliary bishops frequently represent the bishop at parish events and official ceremonies.

A bishop can remove an auxiliary bishop from assigned positions or responsibilities, but only the pope can remove that cleric from the diocese.

Auxiliary bishops have the right to take part in the proceedings of national episcopal conferences. Whether they can votes on episcopal conference decisions, or only have a "consultative vote", is to be determined by each conference.

=== Appointment ===
To receive an auxiliary bishop in his diocese, the bishop must first advise the apostolic nuncio, the pope's ambassador to that country, of the need for an auxiliary. If the nuncio approves the need, the bishop then gives him a terna, or list, of three candidates. They must be priests or monsignors, normally clerics who are already assigned to the diocese.

After investigating the candidates, the nuncio sends his recommendations to the Dicastery for Bishops in the Vatican. A cardinal relator within the Dicastery studies the nuncio's report and then makes his recommendations to the Dicastery. If the Dicastery approves the recommendation, it is then submitted to the pope for final approval.

Because the auxiliary bishop does not have his own territorial see, the pope appoints him as bishop of a titular see. A titular see is a defunct diocese within the church, frequently in any area that no longer has a Catholic population

Canon law stipulates that an auxiliary bishop does not have the right to automatically succeed a bishop who dies or retires: that right only belongs to a coadjutor bishop. For an auxiliary bishop to succeed a bishop, the pope must appoint him to that position. As with other bishops, auxiliary bishops must submit a letter of resignation from their diocese to the pope when they reach age 75. The pope will then decide when to accept that resignation. However, the retired cleric will remain an auxiliary bishop for life.

=== Notable auxiliary bishops ===
During the 20th and 21st centuries, the following clerics became cardinals after serving as auxiliary bishops earlier in their careers:

- Cardinal Wilton Gregory was auxiliary bishop of the Archdiocese of Chicago in the United States, 1983 to 1993
- Cardinal Kevin Farrell was auxiliary bishop of the Diocese of Washington in the United States, 2002 to 2007
- Cardinal Fernando Natalio Chomalí Garib was auxiliary bishop of the Archdiocese of Santiago de Chile in Chile, 2006 to 2011

In 2017, Bishop Gregorio Rosa Chávez became one of the first Catholic auxiliary bishops to be appointed cardinal. At that time, he was serving as an auxiliary bishop of José Luis Escobar Alas, the archbishop of San Salvador.

== Eastern Orthodoxy ==
In Eastern Orthodox Churches, auxiliary bishops are also called vicarian bishops or simply vicar bishops. In the Serbian Orthodox Church, the office of auxiliary (vicar) bishop is entrusted to titular bishops, who are assigned with assisting diocesan bishops in various aspects of diocesan administration.

The Greek word protosyncellus defines an auxiliary bishop who has been elevated to the dignity of vicarian of another titular bishop, and who is assigned to assist and act on behalf of his episcopal authority over the jurisdiction of the episcopal see. For example, Teodosije Šibalić (titular bishop of Lipljan) was appointed auxiliary bishop to the Eparchy of Raška and Prizren in 2004.

== See also ==
- Suffragan bishop
- Coadjutor bishop
