= Albanian Orthodox Church in Kosovo =

Autocephalous Orthodox Church of Kosovo
- Kisha Ortodokse Autoqefale e Kosovës
- Abbreviation: AOCK
- Classification: Christianity
- Orientation: Eastern Orthodoxy
- Scripture: Bible
- Theology: Eastern Orthodox theology
- Archbishop: Nikolla Xhufka
- Language: Albanian
- Liturgy: Byzantine Rite
- Headquarters: Kosovo
- Founder: Nikolla, Pavli and Teostir

The Kosovo Autocephalous Orthodox Church in Kosovo (AOCK) is a new Orthodox Church that has been established in Kosovo. It aims to provide religious services to Orthodox believers who do not identify with the Serbian Orthodox Church. This church was established by the Holy Synod of the KOAK and by local believers with support from various circles inside and outside the country. Its establishment has been welcomed by several communities for their efforts for religious independence and local representation. The temporary headquarters of the Church is located in Pristina, while the construction of a cathedral is expected to serve as the main center. The Kosovo Autocephalous Orthodox Church promotes peaceful interfaith coexistence and the Orthodox identity of non-Serb communities. It follows the Eastern Orthodox tradition and respects the religious calendar of other Orthodox churches. The founders have emphasized that they do not aim for division, but for fair and local representation of believers. The Church has begun to organize masses and services in several areas of Kosovo. Its activities are still developing and are attracting interest in public and religious debates in the country.

The leader of the church is the Archbishop of Prishtina, Peja and All Kosovo, His Grace Nikolla Xhufka.

== Canonical status and recognition ==
The organisation is not recognised by the Serbian Orthodox Church or the Orthodox Autocephalous Church of Albania. The latter has explicitly rejected the clerical status of its founder, Nikolla Xhufka, declaring his ordination invalid and contrary to Orthodox canon law. A spokesperson for the Orthodox Church of Albania has made a statement calling Xhufka "a fraud and a person who is not a priest." The Diocese of Raška and Prizren has likewise stated that Xhufka has never been a cleric of any canonical Orthodox Church. In a 2025 theological publication, Russian Orthodox priest Pavel Bochkov described the organisation as a non-canonical religious group and a new schism on the canonical territory of the Serbian Orthodox Church.

== Activities ==
During the month of April 2025, the Church held a Synodal Mass, led by His Grace Nikolla, His Grace Pavli (Metropolitan of Gjakova) and His Grace Teostir (Metropolitan of Prizren). The Mass was held for about 4 hours, led by the Holy Synod, where also, in the Monastery, the Metropolitan, the Abbot of the Monastery and the founder known as His Grace Teostir, Metropolitan of Prizren, were erected by His Grace Nikola and His Grace Pavli.

Also, the Church of Kosovo (KOAK) has 2 candidates for Priests, there is also a Priest, who joined the Archbishopric of Prishtina, Peja and All Kosovo. He is known by the church name Father Paisi, originally from Elbasan.

== Disputes with the Serbian Orthodox Church ==
Since its establishment, the Kosovo Autocephalous Orthodox Church has faced opposition from the Serbian Orthodox Church, which does not recognize its legitimacy and ecclesiastical status. Disputes have centered on issues related to ecclesiastical jurisdiction, the use of cult objects, the representation of Orthodox believers in Kosovo, and claims over religious heritage.

KOAK representatives have stated that the organization aims to serve Orthodox believers in Kosovo who desire a local church structure, while the Serbian Orthodox Church has opposed this position, considering Kosovo part of its canonical jurisdiction and describing KOAK's activity as illegal from the point of view of church law.

Disputes between the two parties have also taken on an institutional and legal character. Following the holding of religious ceremonies by the KOAK in several church buildings in Kosovo, the Eparchy of Raška and Prizren of the Serbian Orthodox Church has filed criminal charges and requests with the institutions of the Republic of Kosovo, alleging usurpation of property, unauthorized entry and violation of its rights. On the other hand, the leaders of the KOAK have denied these charges, stating that their activity is based on freedom of religion, the right to religious organization and the legislation in force in the Republic of Kosovo.

=== Court proceedings ===
The disputes between the KOAK and the Serbian Orthodox Church have also produced court proceedings in the justice institutions of Kosovo. The cases have included criminal charges, disputes over the use of religious buildings and allegations of interference with church property.

The trials have attracted considerable public and media attention, as they relate to sensitive issues affecting freedom of religion, the legal status of religious communities, the protection of religious heritage and the interpretation of ecclesiastical jurisdiction in Kosovo. In these processes, the parties have held opposing positions, while the decisions and procedures have been developed in accordance with the legislation of the Republic of Kosovo.

The debate about the status of the KOAK and its relations with the Serbian Orthodox Church remains part of the broader discussions on the organization of Orthodox religious communities in Kosovo and their institutional and canonical recognition.

== See also ==
- Albanian Orthodox Church
