= Hadži-Zaharija =

Diocesan Bishop in the Serbian Orthodox Church

Metropolitan Zaharija
- Metropolitan of Raška and Prizren
- Church: Patriarchate of Constantinople
- Diocese: Eparchy of Raška and Prizren
- See: Prizren
- Installed: 1819
- Term ended: 1830
- Predecessor: Joanikije
- Successor: Ananije

Personal details
- Born: around 1770 Vince
- Died: March 15, 1830 Dečani
- Denomination: Eastern Orthodox Christian

Hadži-Zaharija (Serbian Cyrillic: Хаџи-Захарија, ca. 1760–March 15, 1830) was Metropolitan of Raška and Prizren from 1819 to 1830.

== Biography ==
Zaharija was born around 1760 in the village of Vince, near Kumanovo in modern-day North Macedonia. In order to get education, he went to school of the Serbian Orthodox Monastery of Dečani in the region of Metohija. He was noticed as bright and pious by archimandrite Danilo Kažanegra. He joined the Monastery and later went with his archimandrite on a pilgrimage to Jerusalem in 1794 (hence he was called hadži-Zaharije, from Turkish hacı, "pilgrim"). After the death of archimandrite Danilo, he became the next archimandrite of Dečani.

In that time, Monastery of Dečani was one of the most important monasteries in Eparchy of Raška and Prizren, so after the death of Metropolitan Joanikije (Janićije) of Raška and Prizren in 1818, the local Serbs insisted that Zaharija would succeed him. After Mahmud-pasha Rotulović of Prizren, a local plenipotentiary, agreed to it and Zaharija was sent to Constantinople to be consecrated.

His work as Metropolitan of Raška and Prizren came in troublesome times. During the Greek Uprising (1821) several monks of Visoki Dečani were hanged while Zaharija was imprisoned for almost a year.

He died on March 15, 1830, and was buried in Visoki Dečani monastery. He was the last ethnic Serb serving as Metropolitan of Raška and Prizren for almost a century (until 1896), since all of his successors were ethnic Greeks.

In some recent historical works, Zaharija was wrongly attributed with consecrating future metropolitan Petar II Petrović Njegoš of Montenegro into lower orders in 1831, but that was done by his successor Ananije, since in that time Zaharija was already dead.

== Sources ==
- Srpsko učeno društvo (1878). Glasnik Srpskoga učenog društva. U Beogradu. p. 194.
- Вуковић, Сава (1996). Српски јерарси од деветог до двадесетог века (Serbian Hierarchs from the 9th to the 20th Century). Евро, Унирекс, Каленић.
