= Gračanica Monastery =

Serbian Orthodox monastery in Gračanica, Kosovo

Coordinates: 42°35′54″N 21°11′36″E

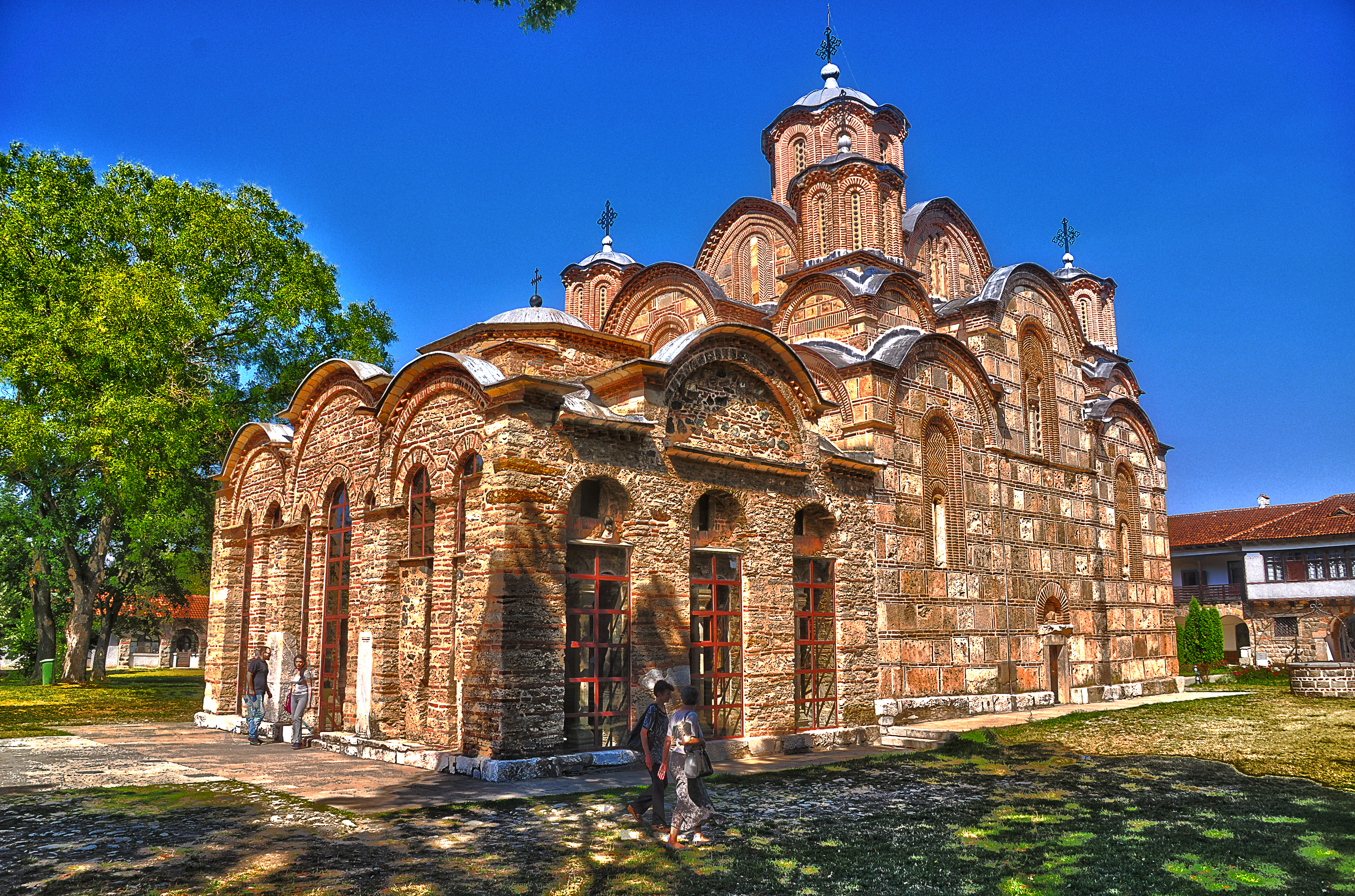
- View of the Gračanica Monastery
- Interactive map of Gračanica Monastery

Monastery information
- Other name: Holy Virgin's temple of Gračanica
- Order: Serbian Orthodox
- Established: 1321
- Dedication: Holy Virgin
- Diocese: Eparchy of Raška and Prizren

People
- Founder: King Stefan Milutin
- Important associated figures: Stefan Milutin, Queen Simonida, Patriarch Makarije Sokolović

Architecture
- Style: Serbo-Byzantine style

Site
- Location: Gračanica, Kosovo
- Public access: yes

UNESCO World Heritage Site
- Type: Cultural
- Criteria: ii, iii, iv
- Designated: 2004 (28th session)
- Part of: Medieval Monuments in Kosovo
- Reference no.: 724-004bis
- Region: Europe and North America
- Extensions: 2006
- Endangered: 2006–...

Cultural Heritage of Serbia
- Official name: Manastir Gračanica
- Type: Monument of Culture of Exceptional Importance
- Designated: 25 October 1947
- Reference no.: СК 1367

The Gračanica Monastery (Serbian: Манастир Грачаница, romanized: Manastir Gračanica; Albanian: Manastiri i Graçanicës) is a Serbian Orthodox monastery located in Kosovo. It was built by the Serbian king Stefan Milutin in 1321. The monastery was declared a Monument of Culture of Exceptional Importance in 1990 and in 2006 it was placed on UNESCO's World Heritage List under the name of Medieval Monuments in Kosovo as an extension of the Visoki Dečani site, which was overall placed on the List of World Heritage in Danger.

The Gračanica Monastery is one of King Milutin's last monumental endowments. The monastery is located in Gračanica, a Serbian enclave in the close vicinity of Lipjan, the old residence of bishops of Lipljan.

== Geography ==
The monastery is located in Gračanica, a Serbian enclave near Lipjan, some 5 km (3.1 mi) from Pristina. It is situated on the Kosovo field, on the left riverbank of Gračanka, a right tributary of the Sitnica. The name is derived from Slavic Gradac, a toponym of fortified cities.

== History ==
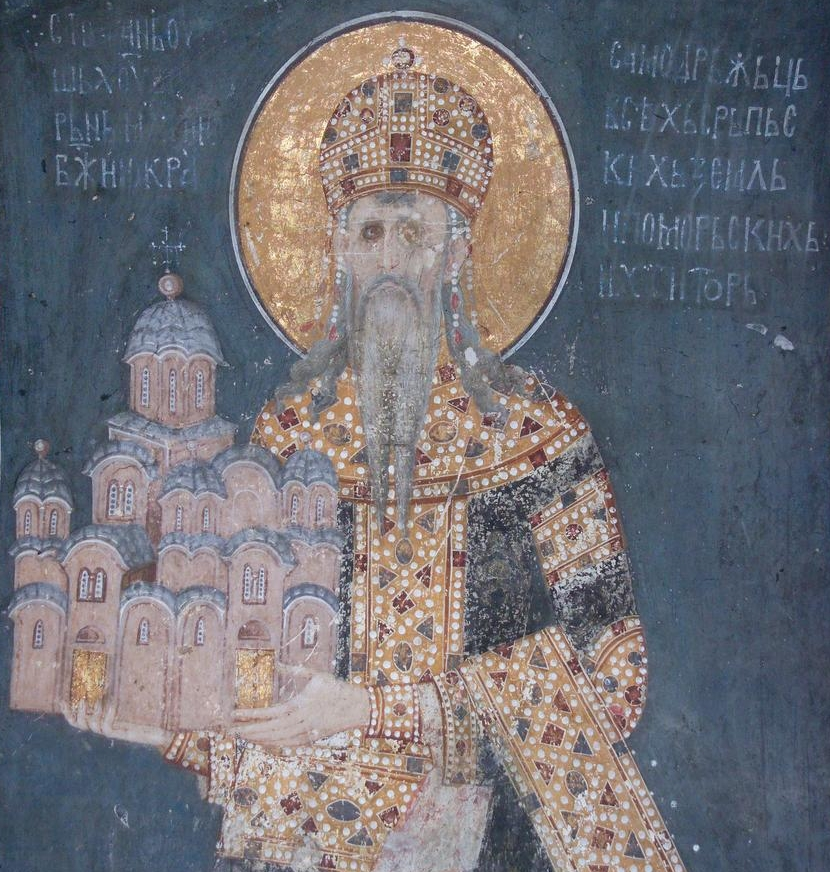
ktetor (founder) fresco with Stefan Milutin holding a model of the church, ca. 1321.

Gračanica was constructed in order to replace an older 13th-century cathedral of the Holy Virgin, located on the same place, in the centre of the Eparchy of Lipljan. Stefan Milutin's ktetor comments are written on the southern wall, including "I have seen the ruins and the decay of the Holy Virgin's temple of Gračanica, the bishopric of Lipljan, so I have built it from the ground and painted and decorated it both from inside and outside". In 1346, when the Serbian Archbishopric was raised to the rank of Patriarchate, the bishop of Lipljan was granted the honorary title of metropolitan bishop, and since that time they were called metropolitans of Lipljan or Gračanica.

Of the former monastic compound, only the church has survived. The narthex and the tower were added a few decades later, in order to protect the frescoes on the west facade. The narthex was heavily damaged by the Ottomans several times between 1379–1383, when the tower was burned and a fire devoured a rich collection of manuscripts and other precious objects. The narthex was reconstructed in 1383. Again, Gračanica suffered damages at the time of the Battle of Kosovo (1389).

During the early period of Ottoman rule, the monastery kept some of its lands (vineyards, fields, meadows, pastures), as attested in early Ottoman defters. Gračanica also remained an important cultural center. In the time of metropolitan Nikanor (1528–1555) several icons were painted on the altarpiece. Also, Nikanor obtained various service books and objects for monastic use, and in 1538-1539 established a cyrillic printing press, publishing the Gračanica Octoechos.

The royal doors were commissioned in 1564 by Metropolitan Dionisije, whose death is represented on a fresco in the narthex. Major restoration took place through efforts of Patriarch Makarije Sokolović. All the openings on the external narthex were walled up and new frescoes were completed in 1570. Thanks to Patriarch Pajsije, the church got its leaden roofing, and in 1620 the large cross with crucifix was made on the iconostasis. The monastery was exposed to new damages toward the end of the 17th century, in the Great Turkish War, after the second siege of Vienna - in which the Serbs took part on the Christian side. Turks removed the leaden cross and pulled out the floor tiles, together with the treasure hidden in the church by Patriarch Arsenije III.

During World War II, the Gračanica Monastery was looted by Albanians. After the World War II it was renewed by nuns and has been serving as a convent since. Today there are 24 sisters in the monastery who are active in icon painting, agriculture, sewing and other monastic obediences.

In 1999 the monastery was bombed twice by NATO airplanes. After the Kosovo War (1998–99), Bishop of Raška and Prizren Artemije Radosavljević transferred his official seat to this monastery from Prizren and since then the monastery has become not only the most important spiritual but also the national and political center of the Serb community in Kosovo.

The monastery was declared a Monument of Culture of Exceptional Importance in 1990, and on 13 July 2006 it was placed on UNESCO's World Heritage List under the name of Medieval Monuments in Kosovo as an extension of the Visoki Dečani site which was overall placed on the List of World Heritage in Danger.

== Architecture ==
Gračanica represents the culmination of the Medieval Serbian art of building in the Serbo-Byzantine tradition. The church has the form of a double inscribed cross, one inside the other, the inner one providing for a vertical silhouette so as to raise the central dome upwards on a graded elaboration of masses. The dome rests on four free-standing pillars. Above the spaces between the cross-shafts, four smaller domes give a regular structure to the whole crowning complex. Three three-sided apses (the central one being the largest) put a mild distinction on the altar space externally. The diaconicon and the prothesis are separated by full walls. Between the nave and the narthex there are wide, heavy pillars and the katolikon (conventual church) is on a level higher. The church was built in alternate courses of brick and stone. At the end of the 14th century an exonarthex was added with double arcades, but these were blinded in the 16th century.

== Art ==
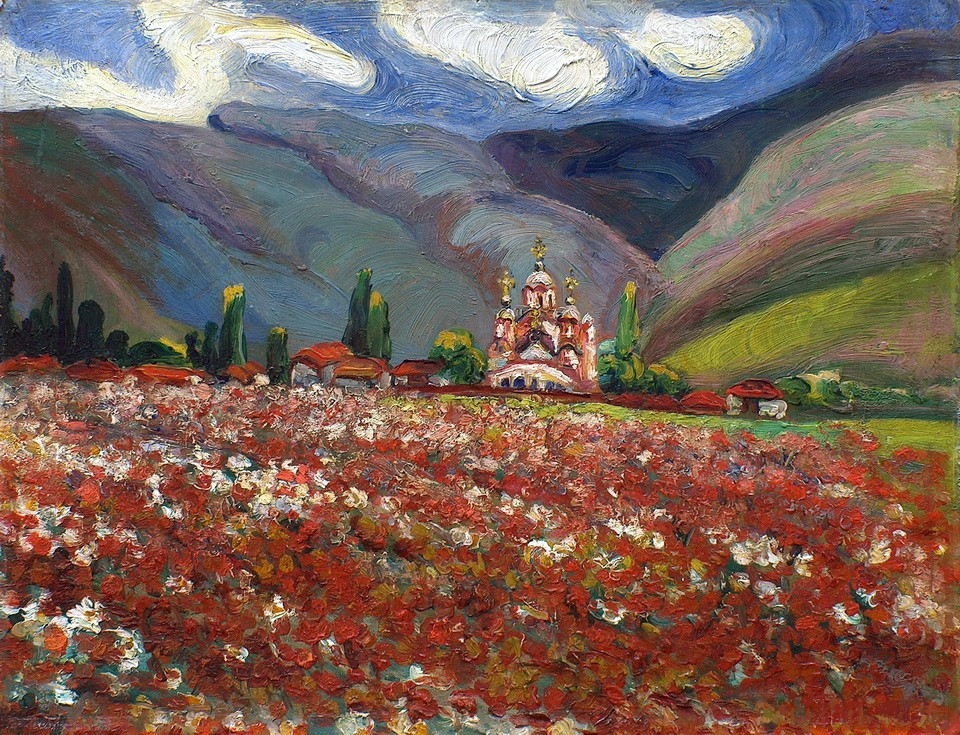
Gračanica painted fauvistically by Nadežda Petrović (1913).

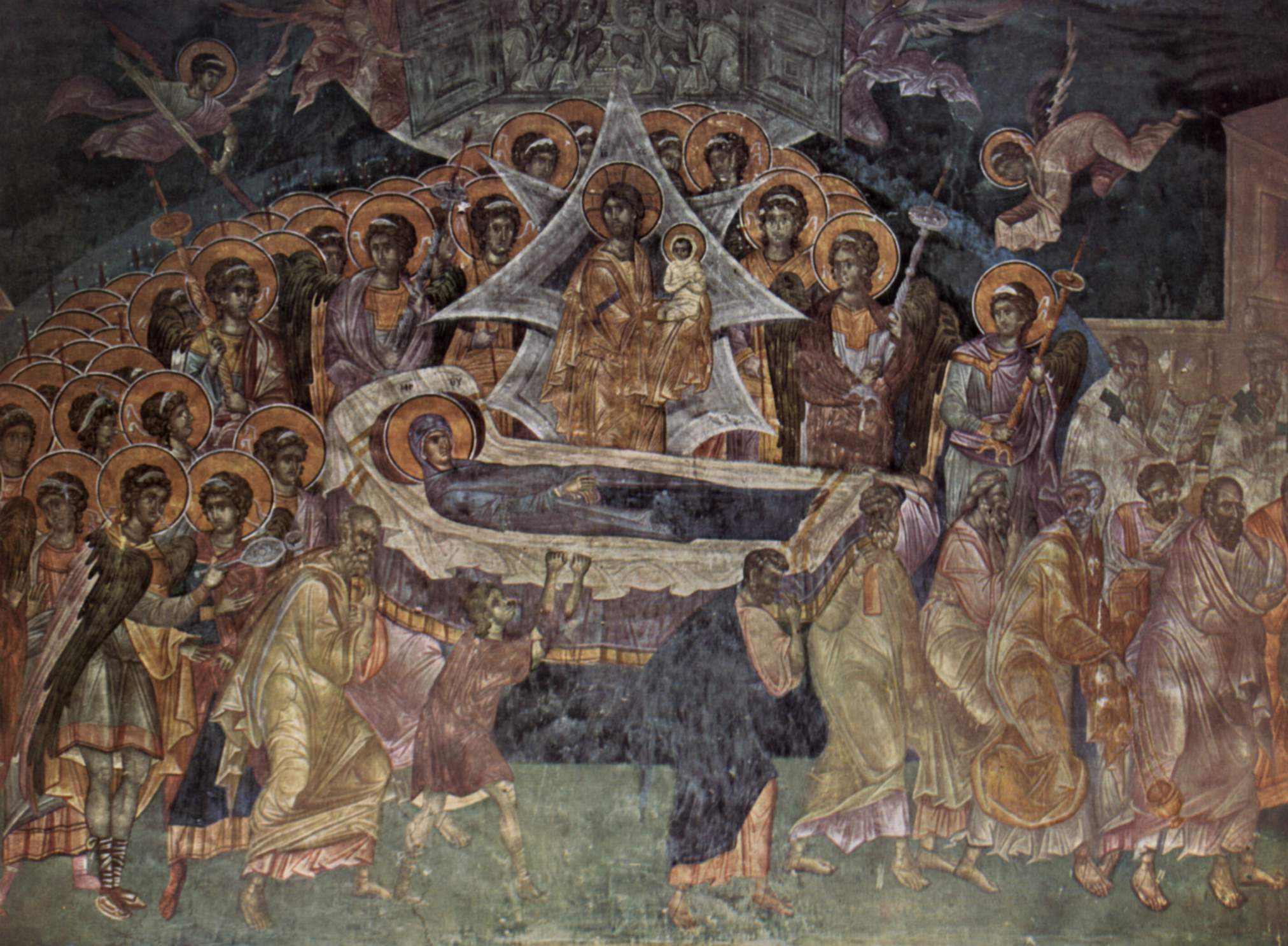
Dormition of the Mother of God, fresco from Gračanica, c. 1321)

In the church three kinds of painting can be discerned. The earliest is found in the nave, whereas two later ones can be recognized in the narthex. The frescoes were painted in 1321–1322. The painting works have been well preserved. The compositions in the nave deal with the earthly life of Jesus and the ecclesiastical calendar.

The focal paintings of Gračanica include the Festival Cycle, the Passion and the miracles of Christ. Inside the narthex, there are portraits of the founders: King Milutin and Queen Simonida, Queen Helen (king's mother) as a nun and King Milutin as a monk. Of particular importance is the Nemanjić dynasty genealogy, the first ever painted, which starts with Stefan Nemanja and ends with Milutin. Also in the narthex, there is an exhaustive illustration of the Last Judgment. The scenes from the life of St. Nicholas are in the north parecclesion, while the walls of the south one display scenes from the Old Testament and the lives of Christ and the Mother of God. The master painters supposedly were Michael and Eutihije with their assistants.

There are also considerable frescoes from 1570 in the exonarthex, commissioned by Patriarch Makarije Sokolović. There are some paintings in the narthex that date back to the late 14th and early 15th centuries, including the Baptism of Jesus, parts of the Virgin's Acathistus Hymns and the Ecumenical Councils. Two subjects, however, dominate the narthex of Gračanica: the Doxology to the Holy Virgin and the procession of the Serbian archbishops from Saint Sava to Patriarch Makarije Sokolović. A historical composition of the death of the Metropolitan of Gračanica Dionisije covers the southeastern part of the narthex.

The paintings of Gračanica rank highest among the achievements of Milutin's period, characterized by influences of the Byzantine splendiferous and luxurious style called the Paleologan Renaissance. In terms of style, they are also related to the art of the other of Milutin's foundations.

== Legacy ==
The design of the Church of Saint Sava in Belgrade is based on the models of Gračanica and Hagia Sophia. In Chicago, the New Gračanica church is a detailed replica of Gračanica, completed and consecrated in 1984. The Hercegovačka Gračanica Monastery (Serbian: Манастир Херцеговачка Грачаница, romanized: Manastir Hercegovačka Gračanica), completed in the year 2000, is a Serbian Orthodox monastery located in Trebinje, in Bosnia and Herzegovina, and is largely a copy of the Gračanica monastery in Kosovo.

There are poems dedicated to Gračanica by Zorka Stojanović and Desanka Maksimović.

== In popular culture ==
- Gračanica ... The Golden Apple, a documentary film of series "Witnesses of Time" produced by the broadcasting service RTB in 1989 was created by PhD Branislav Todic and Petar Savkovic, directed by Milan Knezevic, music was composed by Zoran Hristić.
- Kosovo: A Moment in Civilization

== Gallery ==
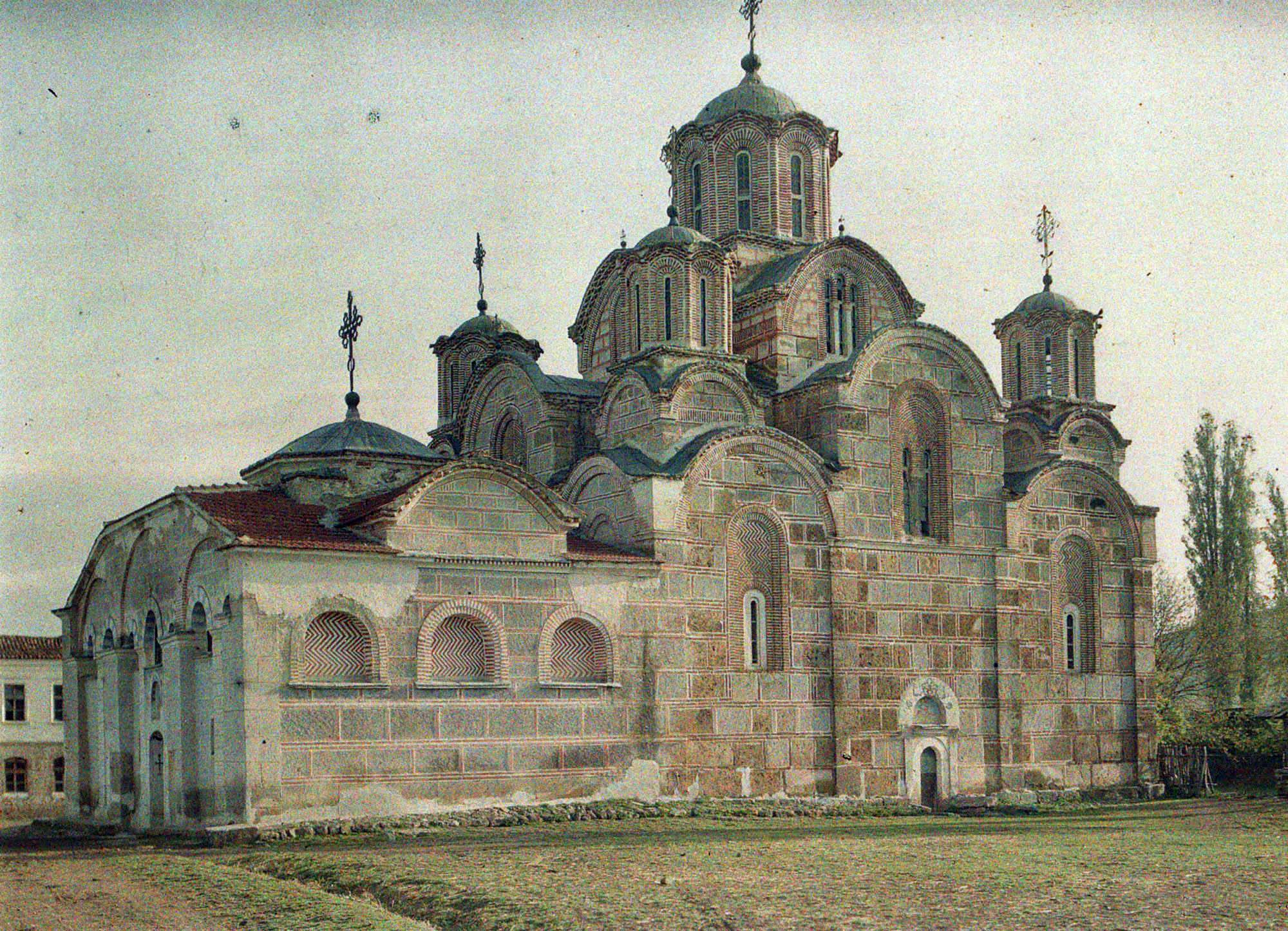
"Gračanica", "Autochrome", Auguste Léon, 1913.

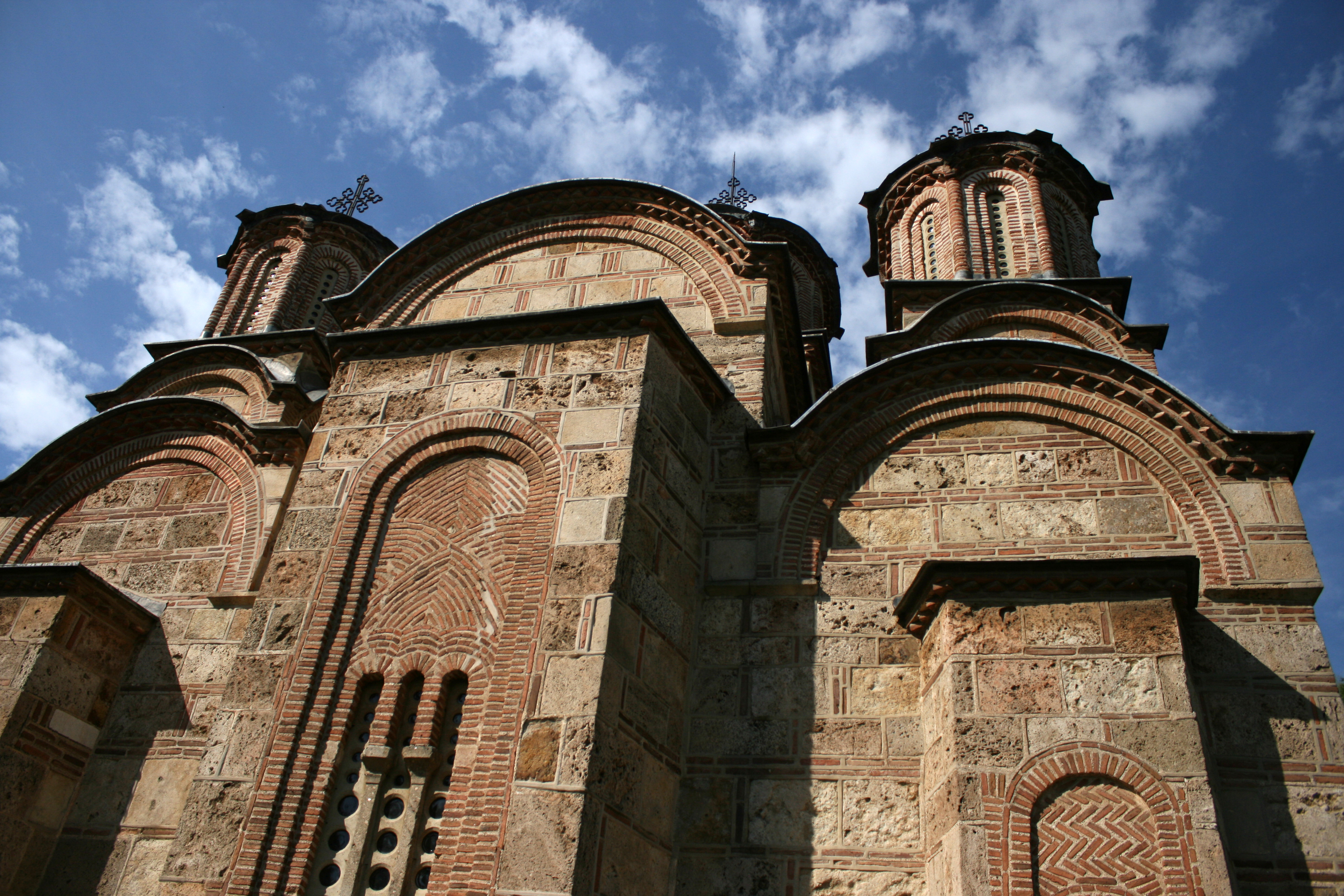
Monastery building.

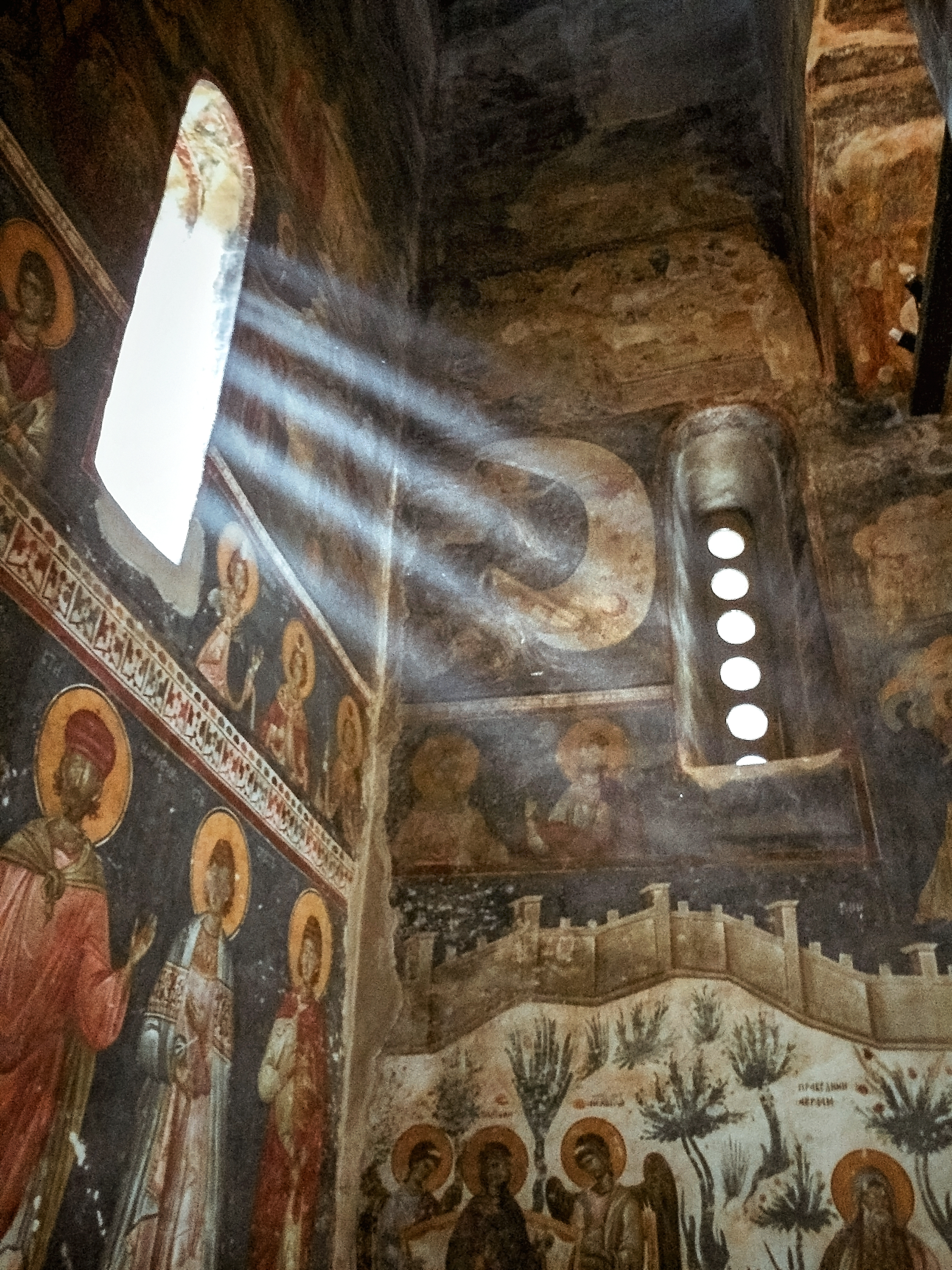
Interior

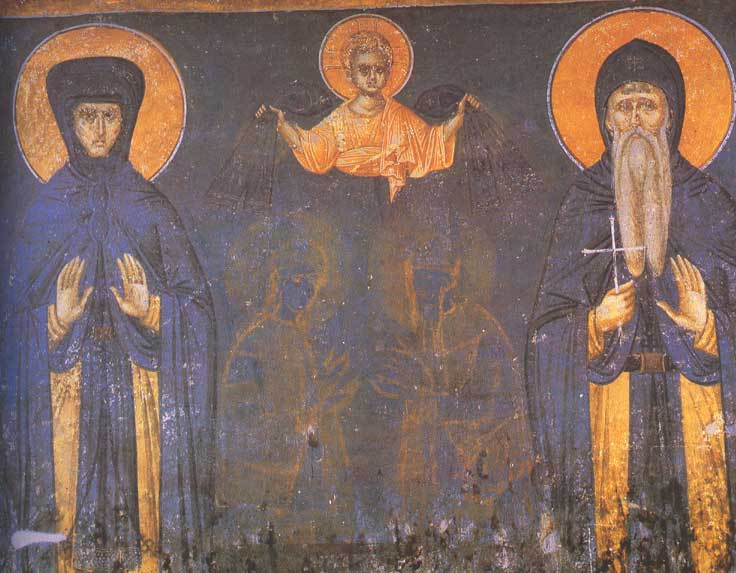
Saint Helen of Serbia as a nun and King Milutin as a monk, fresco from Gračanica.

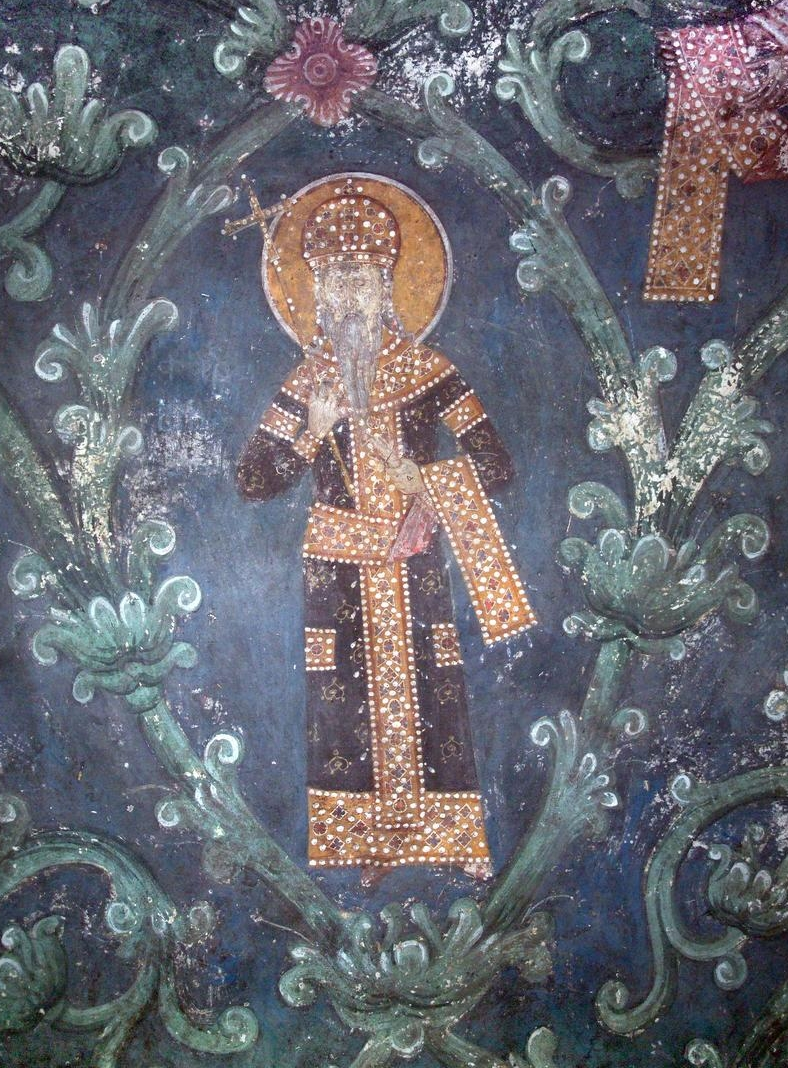
King Stefan Milutin in the Nemanjić family tree, painted in Gračanica.

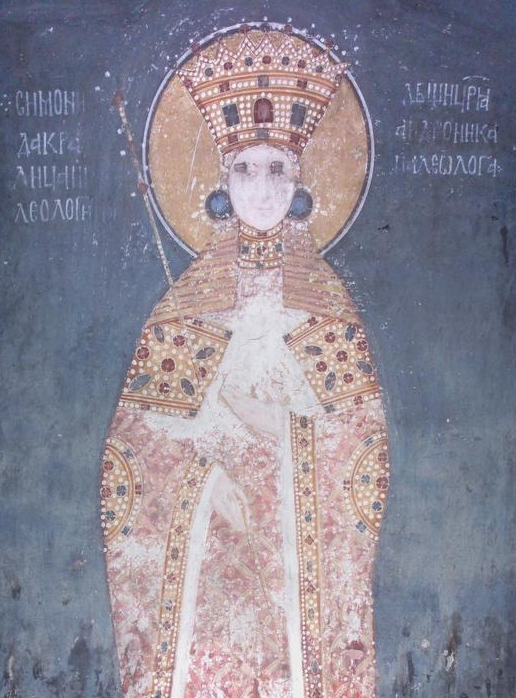
Queen Simonida of Serbia, wife of King Milutin, fresco from Gračanica.

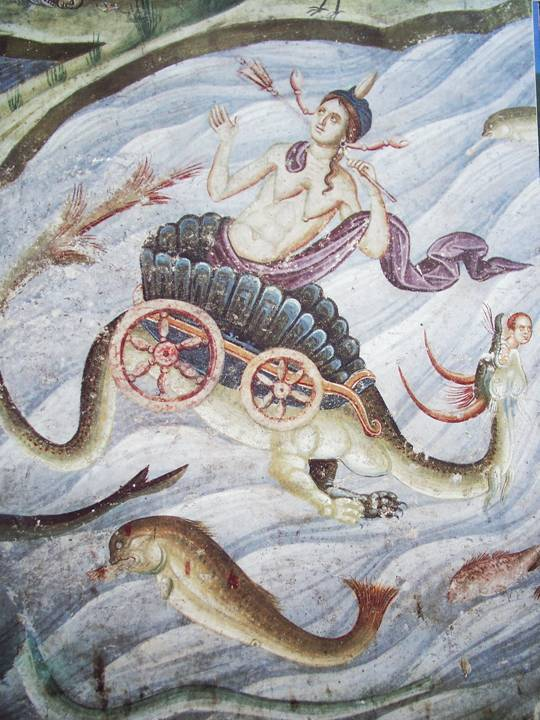
Last Judgment, narthex c. 1321

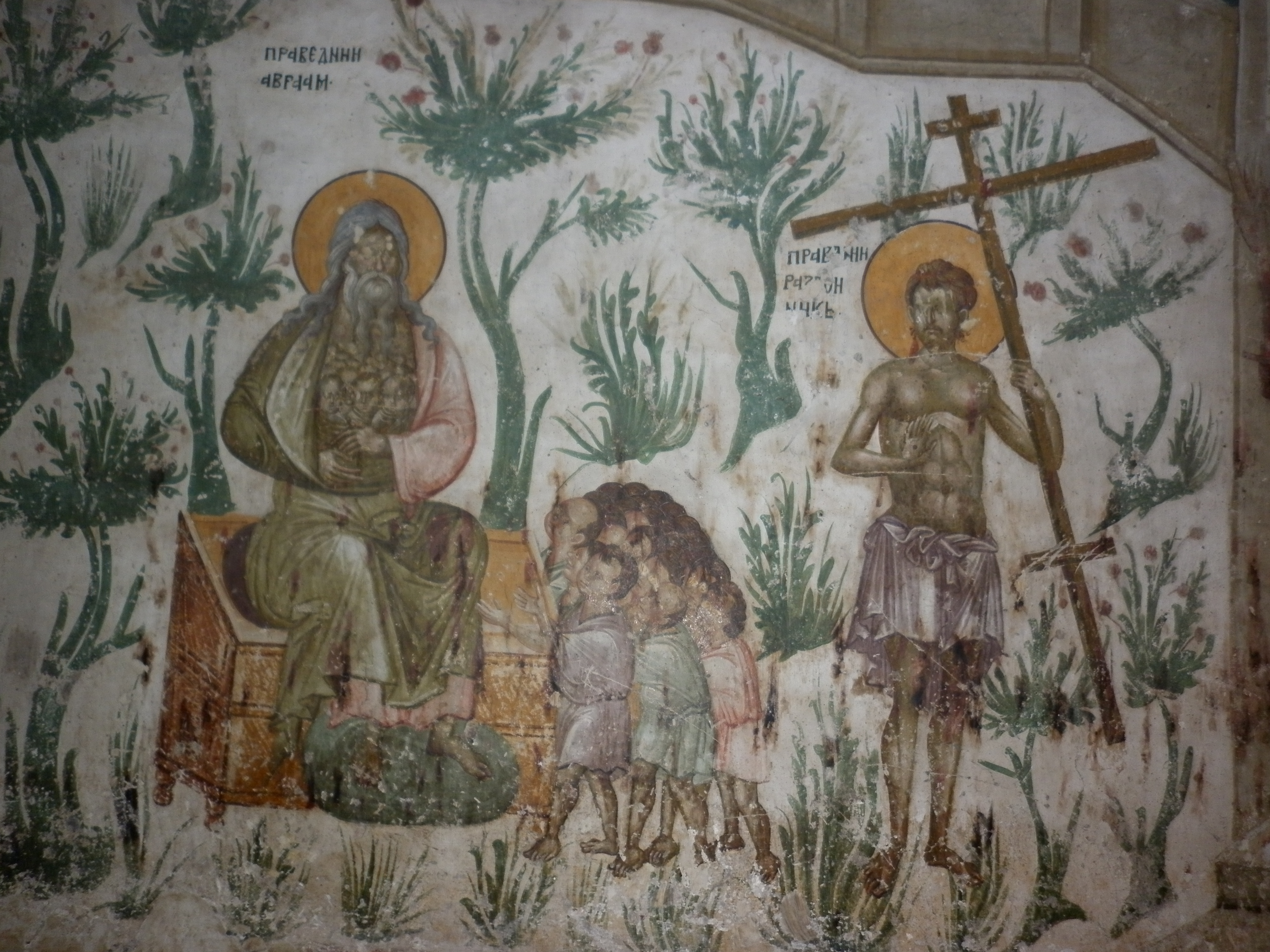
Abraham in paradise

== See also ==
- List of Serbian Orthodox monasteries

== Sources ==
- Bataković, Dušan T., ed. (2005). Histoire du peuple serbe [History of the Serbian People] (in French). Lausanne: L’Age d’Homme.
- Ćirković, Sima (2004). The Serbs. Malden: Blackwell Publishing.
- Ćurčić, Slobodan (1979). Gračanica: King Milutin's Church and Its Place in Late Byzantine Architecture. Pennsylvania State University Press.
- Ivić, Pavle, ed. (1995). The History of Serbian Culture. Edgware: Porthill Publishers.
- Katić, Tatjana; Vučetić, Biljana (2017). "In the time of the Ottoman Empire (1455-1912)" (PDF). Artistic Heritage of the Serbian People in Kosovo and Metohija: History, Identity, Vulnerability, Protection. Belgrade: Serbian Academy of Sciences and Arts. pp. 365–377.
- Mileusnić, Slobodan (1998) [1995]. Medieval Monasteries of Serbia (4th ed.). Novi Sad: Pravoslavna reč; Prometej.
- Popović, Svetlana (2002). "The Serbian Episcopal sees in the thirteenth century". Starinar (51 (2001)): 171–184.
- Subotić, Gojko (1998). Art of Kosovo: The Sacred Land. New York: Monacelli Press.
- Todić, Branislav (1999). Serbian Medieval Painting: The Age of King Milutin. Belgrade: Draganić.
