= Gorioč Monastery =

Serbian Orthodox monastery near Istog, Kosovo

Gorioč
- Гориоч
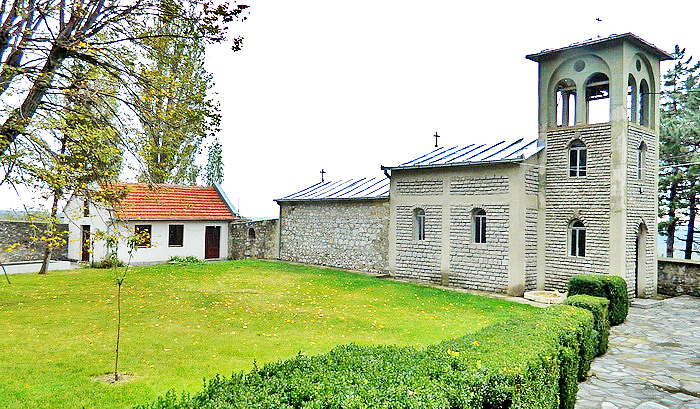
- Interactive map of Gorioč

Monastery information
- Denomination: Serbian Orthodox
- Mother house: Visoki Dečani
- Diocese: Raška and Prizren

People
- Founder: Stefan Dečanski

Architecture
- Functional status: active
- Completion date: 14th century

Site
- Location: near Istok
- Coordinates: 42.7809°N 20.5005°E

The Gorioč Monastery (Serbian: Мaнастир Гориоч, romanized: Manastir Gorioč; Albanian: Manastiri i Gorioçit) is a Serbian Orthodox Monastery in Kosovo, being a metohion (dependency) of the Visoki Dečani Monastery. By tradition it was founded in 14. c by Serbian King Stefan Dečanski, as a gift to St. Nicholas for the healing. Gorioč Monastery is situated on Bela Stena (White Rock), near Istok. Around Monastery church dedicated to St. Nicholas, there are dormitories for nuns and guests as well as bell tower, small economic buildings and fishpond.It depends on the eparchy of Ras-Prizren and appears on the list of cultural monuments of exceptional importance of the Republic of Serbia. The convent complex includes a church, dedicated to Saint Nicholas, a bell tower and the monks' refectory.

== Description ==
The Church of St. Nicholas dates from the 14th century and was restored in the 16th century, the 18th century and the beginning of the 20th century. It consists of a single nave and houses icons and frescoes painted in the 17th and 18th centuries1. The other buildings of the monastery, refectory, bell tower and fountain, are of later construction.

The monastery library housed precious manuscripts and books dating from the 14th and 15th centuries. In the middle of the 19th century, the Russian traveler Aleksandr Hilferding, who was also a historian and consul, brought some of them to Russia; they are now kept in the National Library of Saint Petersburg1.

== See also ==
- List of Serbian Orthodox monasteries
