= Saint George Cathedral, Prizren =

Serbian Orthodox cathedral in Prizren, Kosovo

Saint George Cathedral
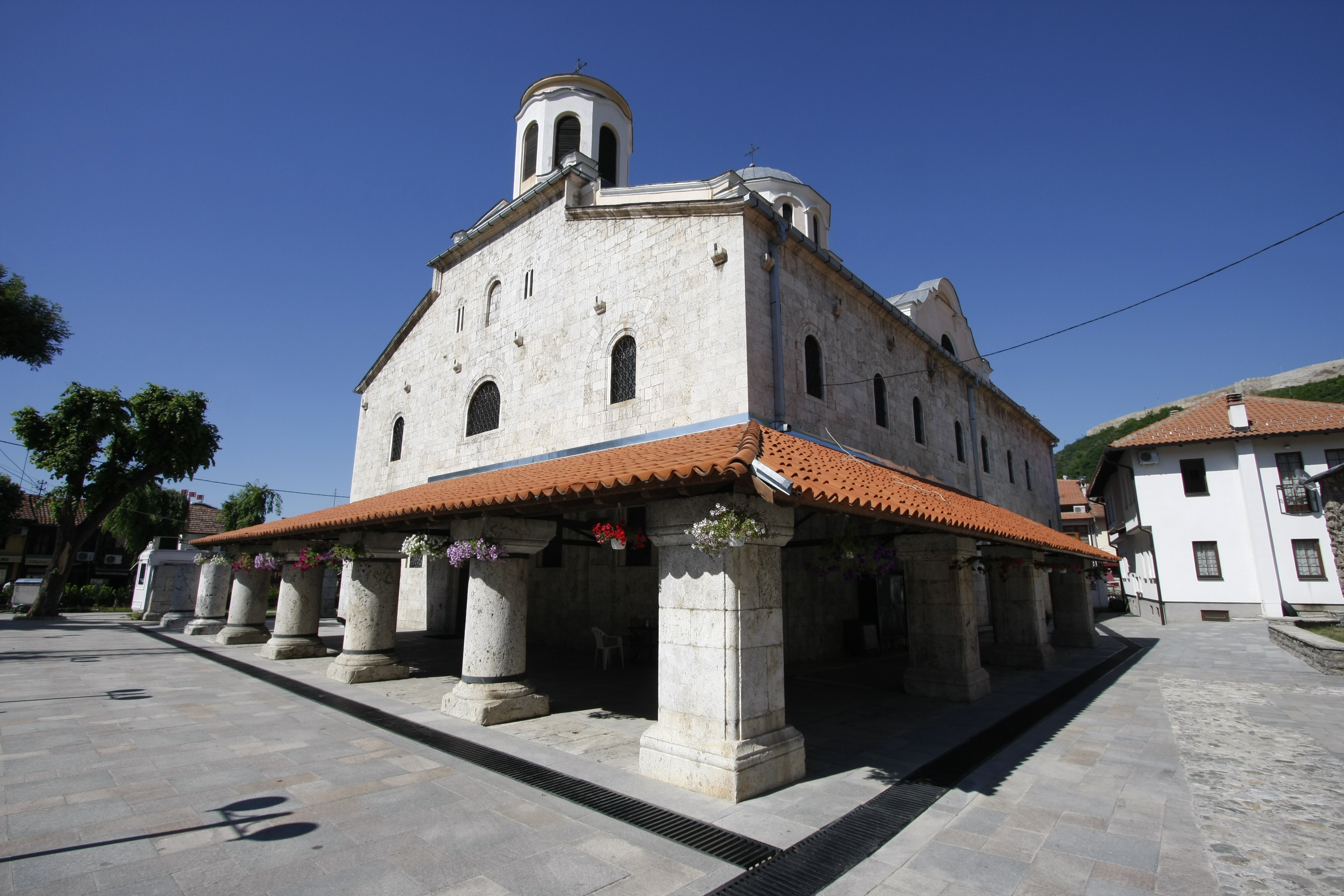
- Saint George Cathedral, pictured in 2012
- Saint George Cathedral
- 42.20820°N 20.74038°E
- Location: Prizren, Kosovo
- Denomination: Serbian Orthodox Church

History
- Status: Cathedral
- Founded: 1856-1887
- Dedication: Saint George

Architecture
- Functional status: Active

Administration
- Diocese: Eparchy of Raška and Prizren

Cultural Heritage of Serbia
- Type: Registered monument

Saint George Cathedral (Serbian: Саборна црква Светог Ђорђа, romanized: Saborna crkva Svetog Đorđa; Albanian: Katedrala e Shën Gjergjit) is an Eastern Orthodox church located in Prizren, Kosovo. It is under jurisdiction of the Eparchy of Raška and Prizren of the Serbian Orthodox Church and serves as its cathedral church.

== History ==
Modern Saint George Cathedral was built in the second half of the 19th century, during the Ottoman rule in the region. Initiative for the creation of a new cathedral church was launched during the first half of the 19th century, and only after long negotiations with Ottoman authorities final permission was obtained in 1855, and foundation was laid in 1856. Up to that point, minor Old Church of Saint George served as a temporary cathedral church of the Eparchy of Raška and Prizren, since Ottoman authorities previously took over the ancient medieval Our Lady of Ljeviš (Bogorodica Ljeviška) church in Prizren, and turned it into a mosque. Local leaders of Eastern Orthodox Christians knew that ancient cathedral will not be returned to them as long as Prizren is under Ottoman rule, and therefore decided to build a new cathedral. Foundations were laid in 1856, but construction was completed in 1887. Prolonged construction was caused by constant financial and administrative difficulties.

After the consecration of the new cathedral in 1887, additional efforts were undertaken in order to complete the internal inventory and decoration of the church. Significant acquisitions were made during the tenure of metropolitan Dionisije Petrović of Raška and Prizren (1896–1900), and his successor, metropolitan Nićifor Perić (1901–1911). Both of them were Serbian Orthodox hierarchs, appointed by the Ecumenical Patriarchate of Constantinople.

The interior of Chapel of Saint George Runovic in the same complex

Major turning point in the history of the Cathedral occurred at the beginning of the First Balkan War (1912–1913). In the autumn of 1912, Prizren was annexed by the Kingdom of Serbia. In the spring of 1913, rector of the Serbian Orthodox Seminary of Prizren, protopresbyter Stevan Dimitrijević was appointed as administrator of the Eparchy. Under the Treaty of London (1913), Albanian-majority Prizren was officially annexed to Serbia. During the First World War (1914–1918), the region was occupied by the armies of the Central Powers from the end of 1915 up to the autumn of 1918. After the liberation in 1918, new Kingdom of Serbs, Croats and Slovenes (Yugoslavia) was created, and included all territories of Serbia. After the Serbian Patriarchate was renewed in 1920, Eparchy of Raška and Prizren was returned to the jurisdiction of the Serbian Orthodox Church, and the Saint George Cathedral of Saint George in Prizren was confirmed as the official cathedral church of the Eparchy.

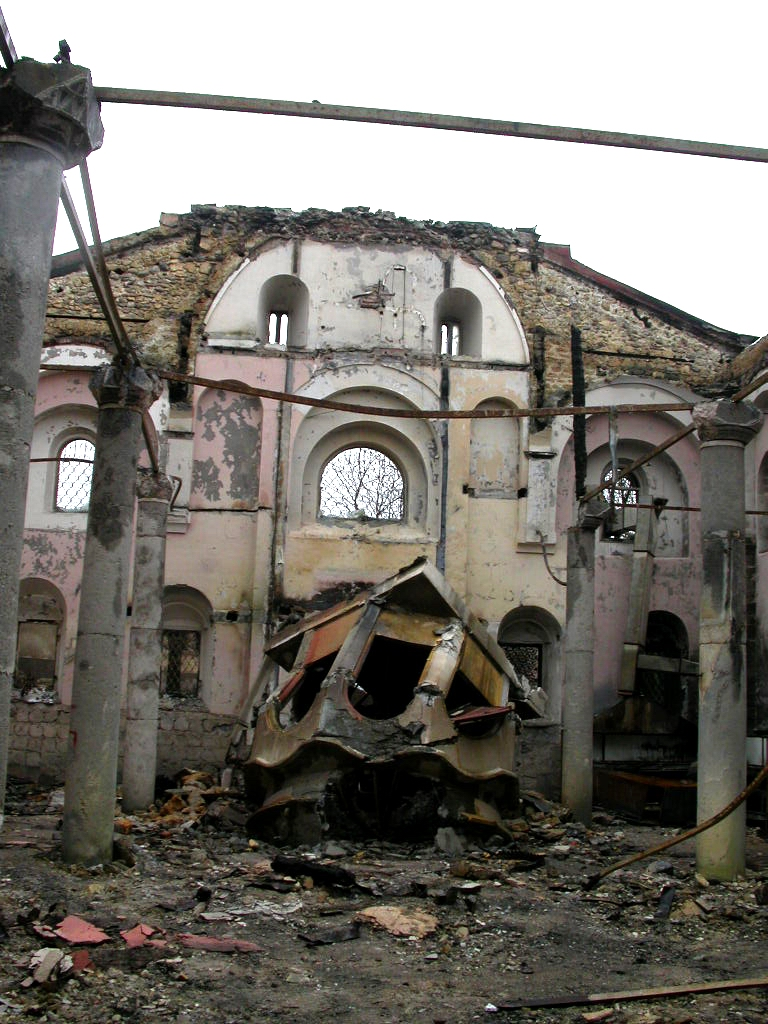
Saint George Cathedral, burned during the 2004 unrest

In 1941, Kingdom of Yugoslavia was attacked and occupied by Nazi Germany and its allies. The central parts of the Eparchy of Raška and Prizren, including the city of Prizren, were occupied by Italians. Formally, Italian occupation zone was annexed to Fascist Albania. That marked the beginning of mass persecution of some ethnic groups in Prizren, and other annexed regions of Metohija (Dukagjini) and central Kosovo. During that period, many Serbian churches of the Eparchy of Raška were looted and destroyed by the Italian Army.

After the Kosovo War (1999), the territory of Kosovo, including Prizren, was placed under the administration of the United Nations Interim Administration Mission in Kosovo. During the unrest of 2004, Saint George Cathedral was looted and set on fire by ethnic Albanian rioters. Only after many difficulties, the cathedral was gradually restored during the next few years. In 2010, newly elected Serbian Orthodox bishop Teodosije Šibalić was enthroned in the restored cathedral in Prizren, by the Serbian Patriarch Irinej. In July 2012, the cathedral was visited by Ban Ki-moon, the Secretary-General of the United Nations. In 2016, a British royal delegation, led by Charles, Prince of Wales, also visited the cathedral.

== See also ==
- Destruction of Serbian heritage in Kosovo

== Sources ==
- Јастребов, Иван С. (1879). Податци за историју Српске цркве. Државна штампарија.
- Новаковић, Стојан (1895). Цариградска Патријаршија и православље у Европској Турској: Разматрања у прилог расправи црквено-просветног питања у Европској Турској. Archived from the original on 31 July 2017.
- Дучић, Нићифор (1896). Рашко-призренска митрополија и национално-културна мисија Краљевине Србије у Старој Србији и Маћедонији.
- Иванић, Иван (1902). Из црквене историје Срба у Турској у XVIII и XIX веку. Друштво Рад.
- Костић, Петар (1928). Црквени живот православних Срба у Призрену и његовој околини у XIX веку. Народна мисао.
- Богдановић, Димитрије (1985). Књига о Косову. Српска академија наука и уметности.
- Вуковић, Сава (1996). Српски јерарси од деветог до двадесетог века. Евро.
- Јевтић, Атанасије (1990). Страдања Срба на Косову и Метохији од 1941. до 1990. Јединство. ISBN 9788670190658.
- Tomasevich, Jozo (2001). War and Revolution in Yugoslavia, 1941–1945: Occupation and Collaboration. Vol. 2. San Francisco: Stanford University Press. ISBN 9780804779241.
- Bouckaert, Peter (2004). Failure to Protect: Anti-minority Violence in Kosovo, March 2004. New York: Human Rights Watch.
- Ćirković, Sima (2004). The Serbs. Blackwell Publishing. ISBN 9781405142915.
- Антонијевић, Ненад (2005). "Албански злочини над Србима у италијанској зони на Косову и Метохији у Другом светском рату". Геноцид у 20. веку на просторима југословенских земаља. Музеј жртава геноцида, Институт за новију историју Србије. pp. 157–166. ISBN 9788690632916.
- Јовић, Саво Б. (2007). Етничко чишћење и културни геноцид на Косову и Метохији: Сведочанства о страдању Српске православне цркве и српског народа од 1945. до 2005. године. Свети архијерејски синод Српске православне цркве. ISBN 9788677580162.
- Henry, Iseult (2007). Hiding Genocide in Kosovo: A crime against God and Humanity. Washington: The American Council for Kosovo. ISBN 9781604027389.
- Радомировић, Славица, ed. (2008). Шиптарски геноцид над Србима у 20. веку: Документа Архиве Епархије рашко-призренске и косовско-метохијске. Епархија рашко-призренска. ISBN 9788682323204.
- Марковић-Новаков, Александра (2011). Православна српска богословија у Призрену (1871-1890). Епархија рашко-призренска: Епархија нишка. ISBN 9788682323303.
- Јагодић, Милош (2012). "Православна црква у новим крајевима Србије (1912-1915)" (PDF). Српске студије (3): 101–135. Archived from the original (PDF) on 23 November 2015.
- Стојчевић, Павле (2013). Извештаји са распетог Косова Светом архијерејском синоду за Свети архијерејски сабор Српске православне цркве 1957-1990. Издавачка фондација Српске православне цркве Архиепископије београдско-карловачке, Фондација патријарх Павле. ISBN 9788684799625.
- Антонијевић, Ненад (2014). "Страдање Срба и Српске православне цркве на Косову и Метохији у Другом светском рату". Српски народ од Сарајевског атентата до Хашког трибунала. Удружење Срба из Хрватске. pp. 138–144. ISBN 9788689877014.
- Радић, Радмила; Исић, Момчило (2015). Српска црква у Великом рату 1914-1918. Филип Вишњић, Просвјета.
- Ђокић, Небојша (2016). "Црква Светог Ђорђа у Призрену до ослобођенја од Турака" (PDF). Каленић (1): 26–31.
- Женарју-Рајовић, Ивана (2016). Црквена уметност XIX века у Рашко-призренској епархији (1839-1912). Институт за српску културу.
- Јагодић, Милош (2016). "Списак парохија у Рашко-призренској епархији за 1913. годину" (PDF). Српске студије (7): 368–411. Archived from the original (PDF) on 31 July 2017.
- Јагодић, Милош (2017). "Свештенство у Рашко-призренској епархији 1913. године" (PDF). Црквене студије (14): 325–348. Archived from the original (PDF) on 30 November 2018.
- Nenadović, Slobodan (1963). Bogorodica Ljevis̆ka: njen postanak i njeno mesto u arhitekturi Milutinovog vremena. Narodna knjiga.
