= Eparchy of Lipljan =

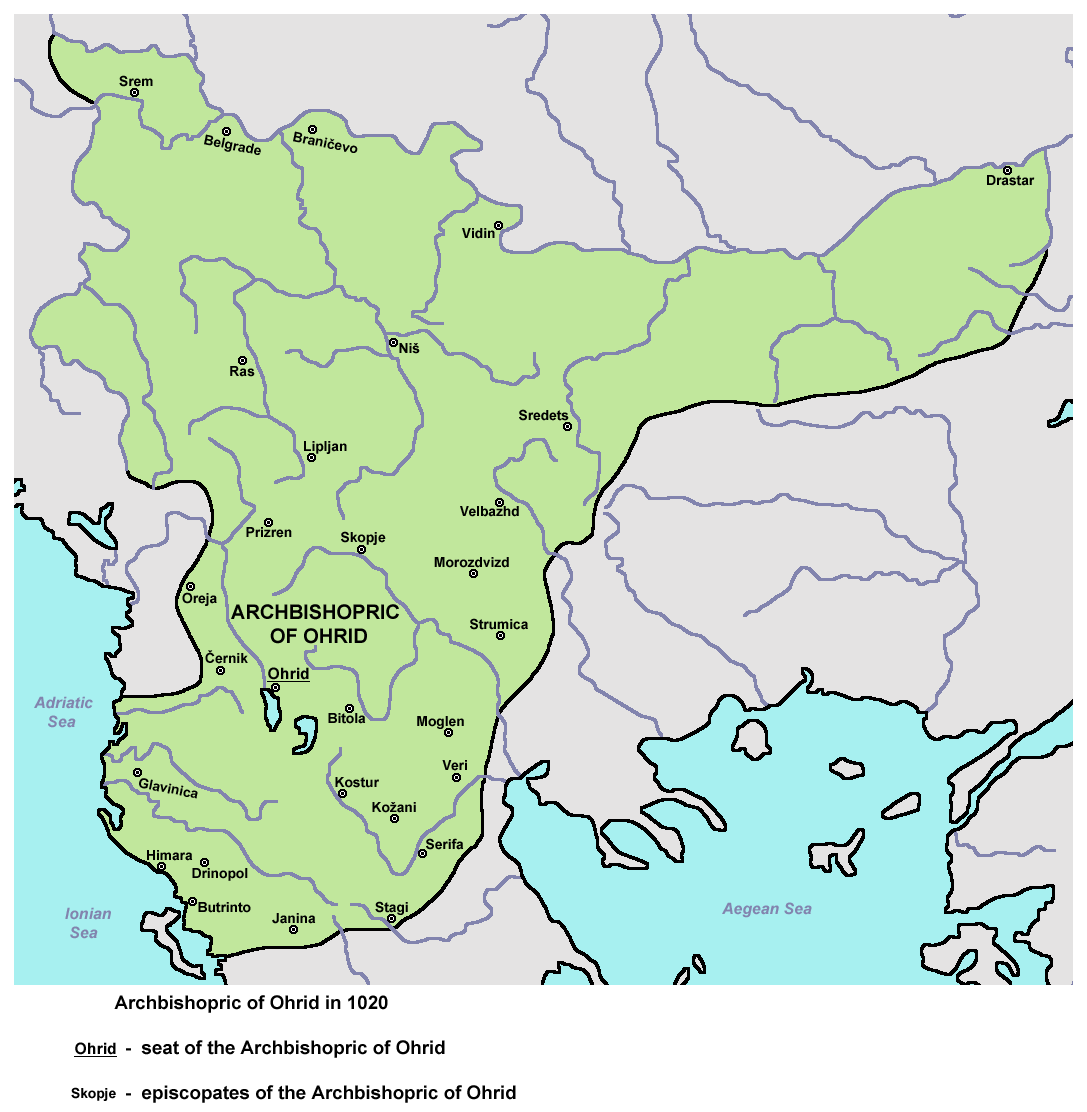
Archbishopric of Ohrid and its episcopal sees, 1019

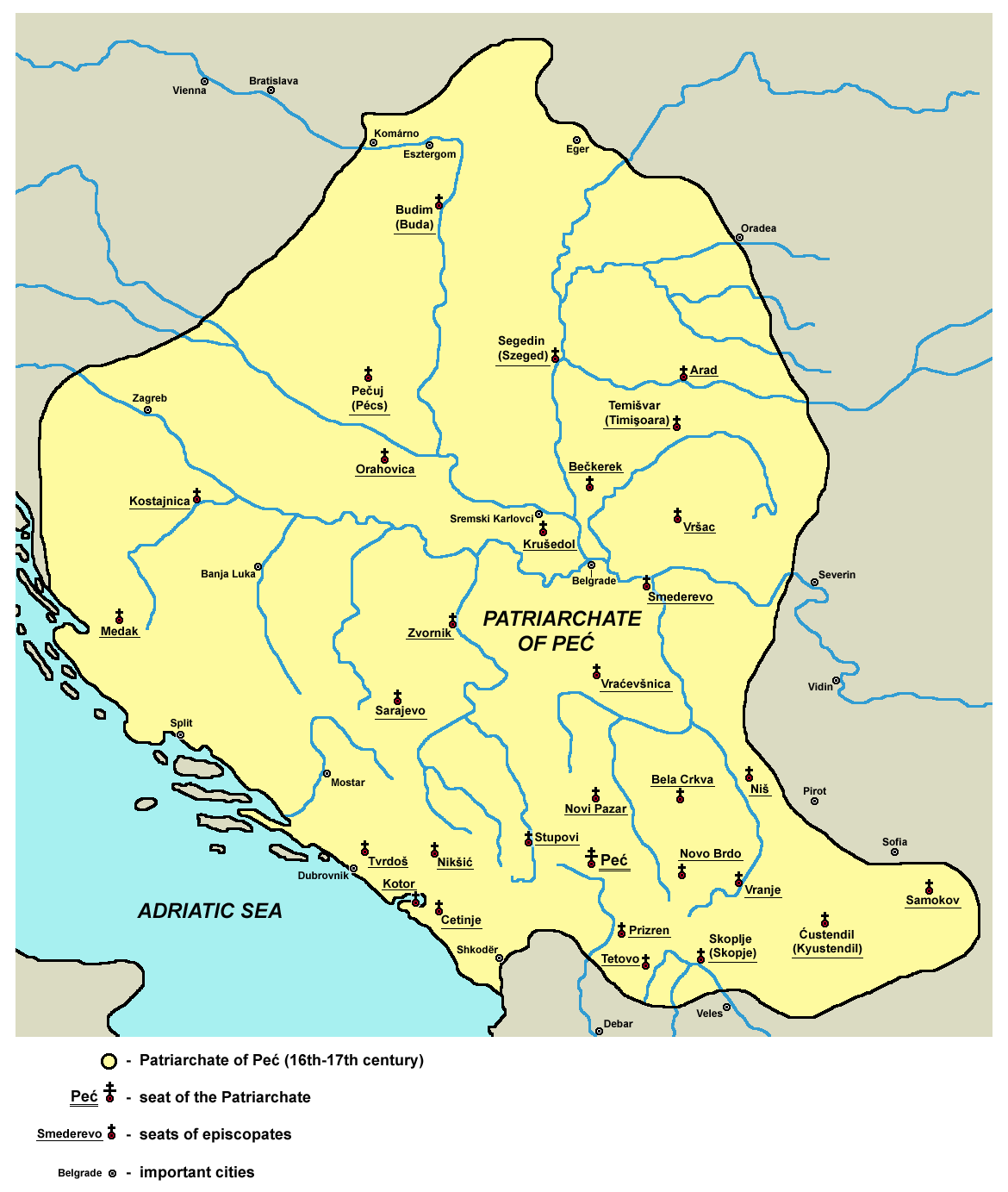
Jurisdiction of Serbian Patriarchate, 16th and 17th century

Eparchy of Raška and Prizren, which includes the territory of the former Eparchy of Lipljan

Eparchy of Lipljan (Serbian: Епархија липљанска, romanized: Eparhija lipljanska), later known as the Eparchy of Gračanica or the Eparchy of Novo Brdo, is a former historical Eastern Orthodox eparchy located in the central parts of Kosovo.

== History ==
In older research, the toponym of Lipjan was linked to Ulpiana, an important city of Roman antiquity. Archaeological and historiographical research in the recent decades has ruled out any links between the two sites.

After the successful Byzantine conquests of 1018 and the establishment of imperial rule in Bulgarian and Serbian lands, by the order of emperor Basil II a new and autonomous Archbishopric of Ohrid was created in 1019, under the supreme ecclesiastical jurisdiction the Patriarchate of Constantinople. Imperial charters of 1019 and 1020 mention the Bishopric of Lipjan among eparchies under the jurisdiction of the autonomous Archbishopric of Ohrid. Until the beginning of the 13th century, archbishops of Ochrid were titled as metropolitans of all Bulgaria and Serbia.

During 11th and 12th century Byzantines and Serbs fought several battles over the city of Lipjan. Sometime between 1185 and 1195, during the rule of Serbian Grand Prince Stefan Nemanja (1168–1196), Byzantine Empire finally ceded Lipljan to Serbia, but Eparchy of Lipljan still remained under the ecclesiastical jurisdiction of the Archbishopric of Ohrid.

The autocephaly of Orthodox Church in medieval Serbia was established in 1219 by Saint Sava who was consecrated as first Serbian archbishop by the Byzantine patriarch residing at that time in Nicaea. Since then, Eparchy of Lipljan was under the constant jurisdiction of Archbishop of Serbia. During the 13th century, bishops of Lipjan known by name were: Mavrojan, Varnava, Sava, and Jovan. Eparchy had jurisdiction over counties of Lipjan, Binačka Morava and Topolnica. At the beginning of the 14th century, bishops of Lipljan were Antonije and Ignjatije. In that time, during the final years of the reign of Serbian king Stefan Milutin (1282–1321), the grand complex of the Gračanica Monastery was built as the seat for bishops of Lipjan.

In 1346, Serbian Archbishopric was raised to the rank of Patriarchate with its see remaining in Peć. At the same time the Eparchy of Lipljan was raised by title to the rank of Metropolitanate. Bishops of Lipjan kept under their jurisdiction the region of central Kosovo with Gračanica and Novo Brdo. Period from the beginning of 13 century to the end of 14 century was the golden age for Orthodox Church in the region of central Kosovo with many monasteries and churches built by Serbian rulers and local Serbian nobility. In the middle of the 14th century, Bishop of Lipljan was Teodor, and second half of the 14th century, metropolitan of Lipjan was Simeon. In the first half of the 15th century, metropolitans of this eparchy were Dionisije and Dositej.

In the time of Ottoman conquests, in the middle of the 15th century, Serbian Orthodox Church suffered great devastation. Region of Kosovo finally fell under Ottoman rule around 1455. Metropolitan Venedikt of Lipljan had to flee from his eparchy, finding refuge at the Court of Serbian Despot Đurađ Branković in Smederevo. By the beginning of the 15th century, Eparchy of Lipljan was returned to the jurisdiction of Archbishopric of Ohrid. In the first half of 16. century, metropolitan of Lipjan was Nikanor (around 1530–1545).

Serbian Patriarchate was renewed in 1557 by patriarch Makarije Sokolović. In that time (16th–18th century), Eparchy of Lipljan remained under constant jurisdiction of Serbian Patriarchate. In the second half of the 16th century, metropolitans of Lipljan were Dionisije (around 1570) and Vasilije (around 1587–1598). In 1614, Metropolitan Pajsije of Lipljan became Serbian Patriarch. After him, Metropolitan of Lipljan was Longin (1616).

Two major events of that time tragically impacted Orthodox Church in the region of central Kosovo. During the Great Turkish War relations between local Muslims and Christians in European provinces of Ottoman Empire were radicalized. As a result of Ottoman oppression, destruction of churches and monasteries and violence against non-Muslim civilian population, Serbian Christians and their church leaders headed by Serbian Patriarch Arsenije III sided with Austrians in 1689 and again in 1737 under Serbian Patriarch Arsenije IV. In the following punitive campaigns, Turkish armies conducted systematic atrocities against local Christian population in Serbian regions, including central parts of Kosovo region, resulting in Great Migrations of the Serbs.

One of the consequences of devastation and depopulation in the regions of central Kosovo during austro-Turkish wars was the reorganization of local Serbian eparchies. At the beginning of the 18th century, the old Eparchy of Lipljan (with Gračanica and Novo Brdo) was merged with the Eparchy of Prizren and they remained united to the present day. In honor to the old Eparchy of Lipljan, auxiliary bishops in modern Eparchy of Raška and Prizren are bearing the title "Bishop of Lipjan"

== List of bishops and metropolitans ==
This is an incomplete list of bishops and metropolitans of Lipjan.

- Mavrojan (13th century)
- Varnava (13th century)
- Sava (13th century)
- Jovan (13th century)
- Antonije (beginning of 14th century)
- Ignjatije (first half of 14th century)
- Teodor (middle of 14th century)
- Simeon (around 1383–1388)
- Dionisije (first half of 15th century)
- Dositej (first half of 15th century)
- Venedikt (around 1455)
- Nikanor (around 1530–1545)
- Dionisije (around 1570)
- Vasilije (around 1587–1598)
- Pajsije (1612–1614)
- Longin (around 1616)

== See also ==
- List of eparchies of the Serbian Orthodox Church

== Sources ==
- Bulić, Dejan (2013). "The Fortifications of the Late Antiquity and the Early Byzantine Period on the Later Territory of the South-Slavic Principalities, and their re-occupation". The World of the Slavs: Studies of the East, West and South Slavs: Civitas, Oppidas, Villas and Archeological Evidence (7th to 11th Centuries AD). Belgrade: The Institute for History. pp. 137–234.
- Ćirković, Sima (2004). The Serbs. Malden: Blackwell Publishing.
- Ćurčić, Slobodan (1979). Gračanica: King Milutin's Church and Its Place in Late Byzantine Architecture. Pennsylvania State University Press.
- Curta, Florin (2001). The Making of the Slavs: History and Archaeology of the Lower Danube Region, c. 500–700. Cambridge: Cambridge University Press.
- Curta, Florin (2006). Southeastern Europe in the Middle Ages, 500–1250. Cambridge: Cambridge University Press.
- Грујић, Радослав (1993). Азбучник Српске православне цркве. Београд: БИГЗ, Музеј СПЦ.
- Harnack, Adolf (1905). The Expansion of Christianity in the First Three Centuries. Vol. 2. New York: Putnam's Sons.
- Ивановић, Радомир (1961). "Земљишни поседи грачаничког властелинства (Land Property of the Monastery Gračanica in Middle Ages)". Историјски часопис (11: 1960): 253–264.
- Јанковић, Марија (1983). "Липљанска епископија и Грачаничка митрополија (The Lipljan Bishopric and the Metropolitanate of Gračanica)". Историјски часопис (29-30: 1982-1983): 27–37.
- Јанковић, Марија (1985). Епископије и митрополије Српске цркве у средњем веку (Bishoprics and Metropolitanates of Serbian Church in Middle Ages). Београд: Историјски институт САНУ.
- Mócsy, András (2014) [1974]. Pannonia and Upper Moesia: A History of the Middle Danube Provinces of the Roman Empire. New York: Routledge.
- Papazoglu, Fanula (1978). The Central Balkan Tribes in pre-Roman Times: Triballi, Autariatae, Dardanians, Scordisci and Moesians. Amsterdam: Hakkert.
- Pavlovich, Paul (1989). The History of the Serbian Orthodox Church. Serbian Heritage Books.
- Pavlowitch, Stevan K. (2002). Serbia: The History behind the Name. London: Hurst & Company.
- Petrović, Vladimir P. (2007). "Pre-Roman and Roman Dardania: Historical and Geographical Considerations" (PDF). Balcanica. 37. Balkanološki institut SANU: 7–23.
- Popović, Svetlana (2002). "The Serbian Episcopal sees in the thirteenth century (Српска епископска седишта у XIII веку)". Старинар (51: 2001): 171–184.
- Stephenson, Paul (2000). Byzantium's Balkan Frontier: A Political Study of the Northern Balkans, 900–1204. Cambridge: Cambridge University Press.
- Subotić, Gojko (1998). Art of Kosovo: The Sacred Land. New York: Monacelli Press.
- Teichner, Felix (2015). "Ulpiana - Iustiniana secunda (Kosovo) : das urbane Zentrum des dardanischen Bergbaubezirks". Ephemeris Napocensis. 25.
- Вуковић, Сава (1996). Српски јерарси од деветог до двадесетог века (Serbian Hierarchs from the 9th to the 20th Century). Евро, Унирекс, Каленић.
- Whitby, Michael (1988). The Emperor Maurice and his Historian: Theophylact Simocatta on Persian and Balkan warfare. Oxford: Clarendon Press.
- Zeiller, Jacques (1918). Les origines chrétiennes dans les provinces danubiennes de l'Empire romain. Paris: E. De Boccard.
- Зиројевић, Олга (1984). Цркве и манастири на подручју Пећке патријаршије до 1683. године. Београд: Историјски институт, Народна књига.
- Živković, Tibor; Bojanin, Stanoje; Petrović, Vladeta, eds. (2000). Selected Charters of Serbian Rulers (XII-XV Century): Relating to the Territory of Kosovo and Metohia. Athens: Center for Studies of Byzantine Civilisation.
- Живковић, Тибор (2000). Словени и Ромеји: Славизација на простору Србије од VII до XI века (The Slavs and the Romans). Београд: Историјски институт САНУ, Службени гласник.
- Живковић, Тибор (2002). Јужни Словени под византијском влашћу 600-1025 (South Slavs under the Byzantine Rule 600-1025). Београд: Историјски институт САНУ, Службени гласник.
- Живковић, Тибор (2004). Црквена организација у српским земљама: Рани средњи век (Organization of the Church in Serbian Lands: Early Middle Ages). Београд: Историјски институт САНУ, Службени гласник.
- Živković, Tibor (2008). Forging unity: The South Slavs between East and West 550-1150. Belgrade: The Institute of History, Čigoja štampa.
