= Eparchy of Raška and Prizren =

Diocese of the Serbian Orthodox Church

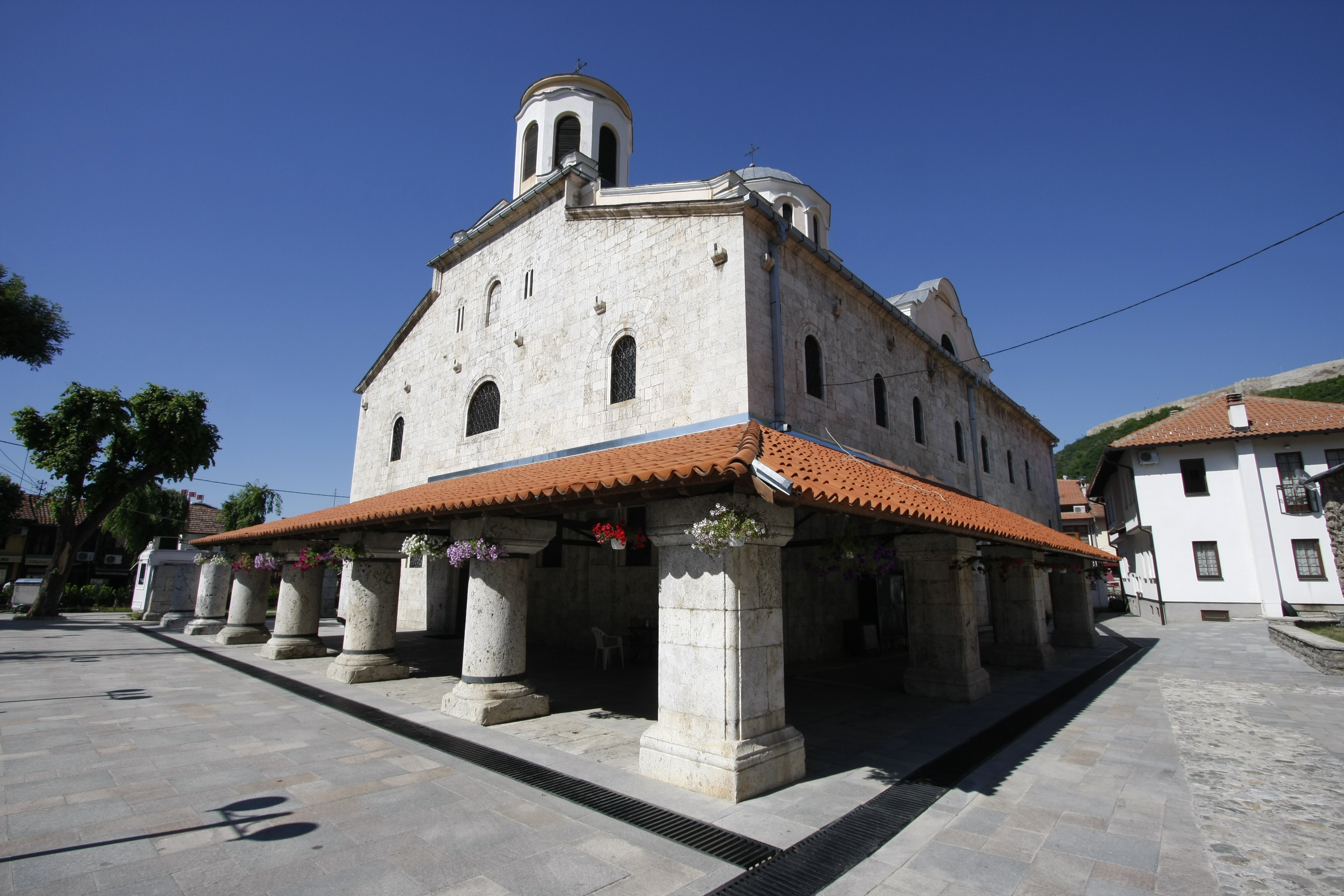
- Saint George Cathedral, Prizren

Location
- Territory: Kosovo, Raška (Serbia)
- Headquarters: Gračanica Monastery, Gračanica, Kosovo

Information
- Denomination: Eastern Orthodox
- Sui iuris church: Serbian Orthodox Church
- Established: 1808
- Cathedral: Saint George Cathedral, Prizren
- Language: Church Slavonic, Serbian

Current leadership
- Bishop: Teodosije Šibalić

Map

Website
- Eparchy of Raška and Prizren

Eparchy of Raška and Prizren (Note: Also known as the Eparchy of Raška-Prizren and Kosovo-Metohija.) (Serbian: Епархија рашко-призренска, romanized: Eparhija raško-prizrenska, Albanian: Eparkia Rashkë - Prizren) is a diocese (eparchy) of the Serbian Orthodox Church, covering Kosovo and historical region of Raška (Serbia).

The episcopal see is located at the Saint George Cathedral in Prizren, Kosovo. Its headquarters and bishop's residence are located at Gračanica Monastery in Gračanica, Kosovo.

== History ==
=== Archbishopric of Justiniana Prima ===
Within the territory of the present-day Eparchy of Raška and Prizren several older eparchies existed throughout history. One of them was the ancient Bishopric of Ulpiana also known as Iustiniana Secunda situated near the modern town of Lipjan, where the remains of episcopal Basilica dating from the first half of 6th century have been found and excavated. Originally, the episcopal see of Ulpiana was under the supreme jurisdiction of the Archbishopric of Thessaloniki, and in 535 it was transferred to newly created Archbishopric of Justiniana Prima. The existence of several ancient churches in Ras and area of Ras could indicate existence of an ancient episcopy, possibly connected to the ancient Diocese of Ulpiana.

Byzantine rule in that region collapsed at the beginning of the 7th century, but the church life was renewed in the same century in Illyricum and Dalmatia after a more pronounced Christianization of the Serbs and other Slavs by the Roman Church. In the 7th and mid-8th century the area was not under jurisdiction of the Patriarchate of Constantinople.

=== Bishopric of Ras ===
Old ecclesiastical organization was partly preserved in the region, but the initial ecclesiastical affiliation with a specific diocese is uncertain. In early medieval Serbia, its ecclesiastical center and capital was probably at Destinikon. By the late 9th century during the rule of Mutimir, the Church in Serbia seemingly did not have its bishop, and Mutimir decided to accept Byzantine emperor Basil I's expansion and moved the Church in Serbia away from the Roman Church in favor of the Ecumenical Patriarchate of Constantinople.

The Bishopric of Ras was named after the old-Bulgarian-Serbian fortress of Ras, previously named in Latin as Arsa (mid-6th century). The name of the entire region of Raška (lat. Rascia) is derived since the 11th century. The fort was abandoned in the late 6th or early 7th century. According to De Administrando Imperio, in the late 9th century it was located on the border between Serbia and the First Bulgarian Empire, and was not listed among the inhabited cities of Serbia. There is no consensus in academia as to whether Ras was located on the Serbian or Bulgarian side of the border, although newer research indicates that Ras was renovated, inhabited and controlled by the Bulgarians since the mid-9th century, hence being "a frontier district of Bulgaria".

Alexis P. Vlasto argued that the Bishopric of Ras was founded during Mutimir's rule, as a bishopric of Serbia, at Ras with the Church of the Holy Apostles Peter and Paul. In the period of major ecclesiastical events that took place around the Fourth Council of Constantinople in 879–880, the decision was made by the Patriarchate of Constantinople to create an autonomous Archbishopric of Bulgaria after the Conversion of Bulgarians to Christianity and secondly, the decision of 870 confirmed the attachment of the Bulgarian Church to Eastern Orthodoxy. The Byzantines supported the formation of many metropolises and when the Archbishopric of Bulgaria received autocephalous status in 880, all the metropolises became part of it. However, Tibor Živković concluded, based on primary sources of the Church of Constantinople, that there was no information regarding the establishment of any new ecclesiastical center and organization in Serbia, and that Ras was only a border fort in the mid-9th century which became the ecclesiastical center of the bishopric by 1019-1020. The imperial charter of Basil II from 1020 to the Archbishopric of Ohrid, in which the rights and jurisdictions were established, has the earliest mention, stating that the Bishopric of Ras belonged to the autocephalous Archbishopric of Bulgaria during the time of Peter I (927–969) and Samuel (977–1014). It was of a small size. It is considered that it was possibly founded by the Bulgarian emperor, or it is the latest date when it could have been integrated to the Bulgarian Church. If it previously existed, it probably was part of the Bulgarian metropolis of Morava, but certainly not of Durrës. If it was on Serbian territory, it seems that the Church in Serbia or part of the territory of Serbia became linked and influenced by the Bulgarian Church between 870 and 924.

In the time of emperor John I Tzimiskes (969–976), after a successful campaign in 971, Byzantine rule was shortly restored in the region on both the Serbian and Bulgarian part of border, with protospatharios John appointed as governor (catepan) of Ras.

=== Archbishopric of Ohrid ===
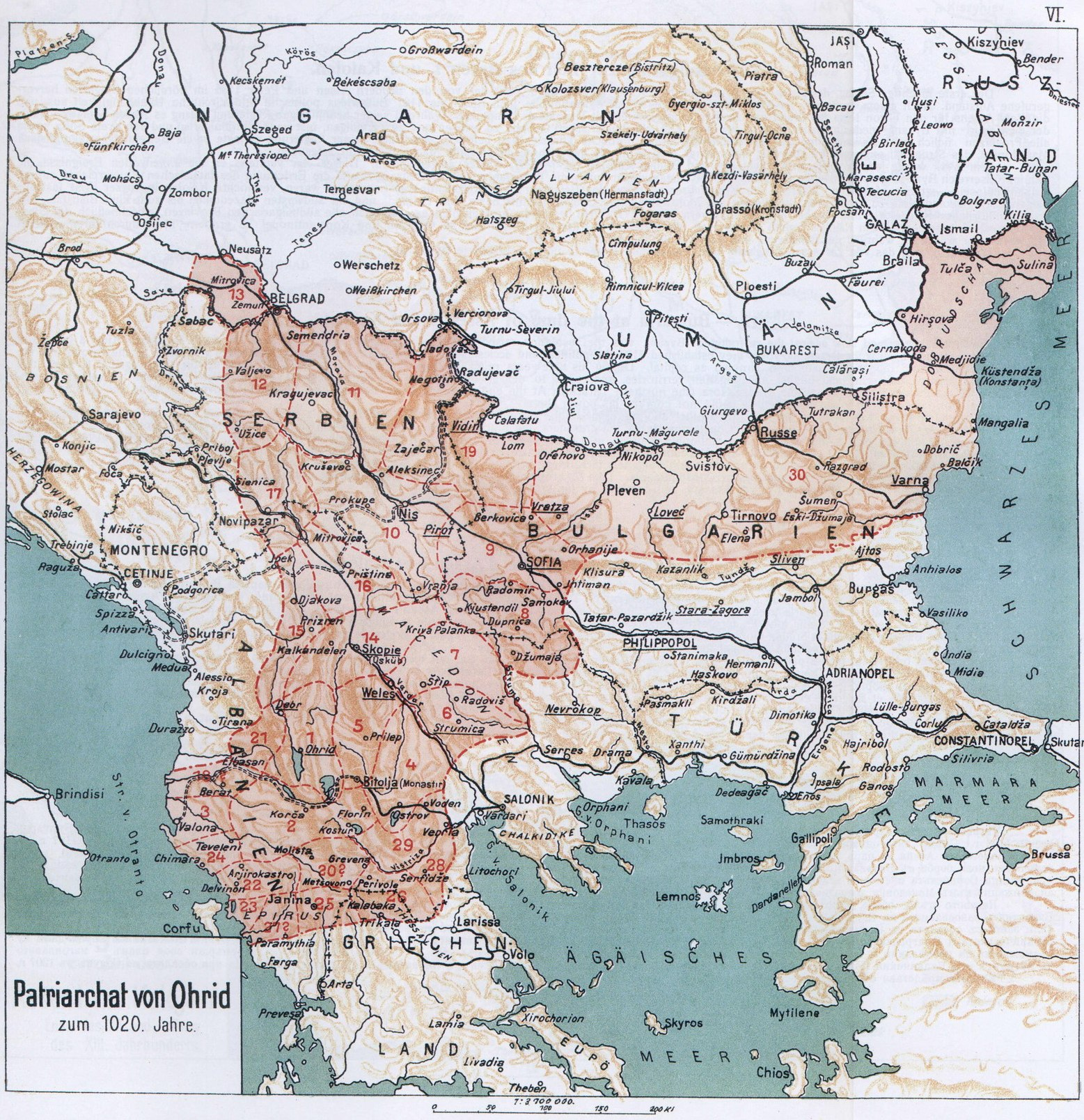
Jurisdiction of the Archbishopric of Ohrid

After the victorious Byzantine conquest of First Bulgarian Empire in 1018, by order of emperor Basil II an autonomous Archbishopric of Ohrid was established in 1019, by lowering the rank of the autocephalous Bulgarian Patriarchate due to its subjugation to Constantinople, placing it under the supreme ecclesiastical jurisdiction the Patriarchate of Constantinople. Imperial charters of 1019 and 1020 mention three bishoprics on the territory of present-day Eparchy of Raška and Prizren with episcopal sees in the towns of Ras, Prizren, and Lipljan. All three were designated as distinct dioceses of the autonomous Archbishopric of Ohrid.

=== Serbian Archbishopric ===
The autocephaly of Serbian Archbishopric was achieved in 1219 by Saint Sava, who was consecrated as first Serbian archbishop by the Byzantine patriarch residing at that time in Nicaea. All of the three old eparchies of Raška, Prizren and Lipljan were, with some interruptions, under the jurisdiction of Serbian Archbishopric and Serbian Orthodox Church ever since. New eparchy of Hvosno was also created in northern parts of the region of Metohija. The see of Serbian archbishop was soon transferred from Žiča Monastery to Patriarchate of Peć Monastery in Metohija.

=== Serbian Patriarchate of Peć ===
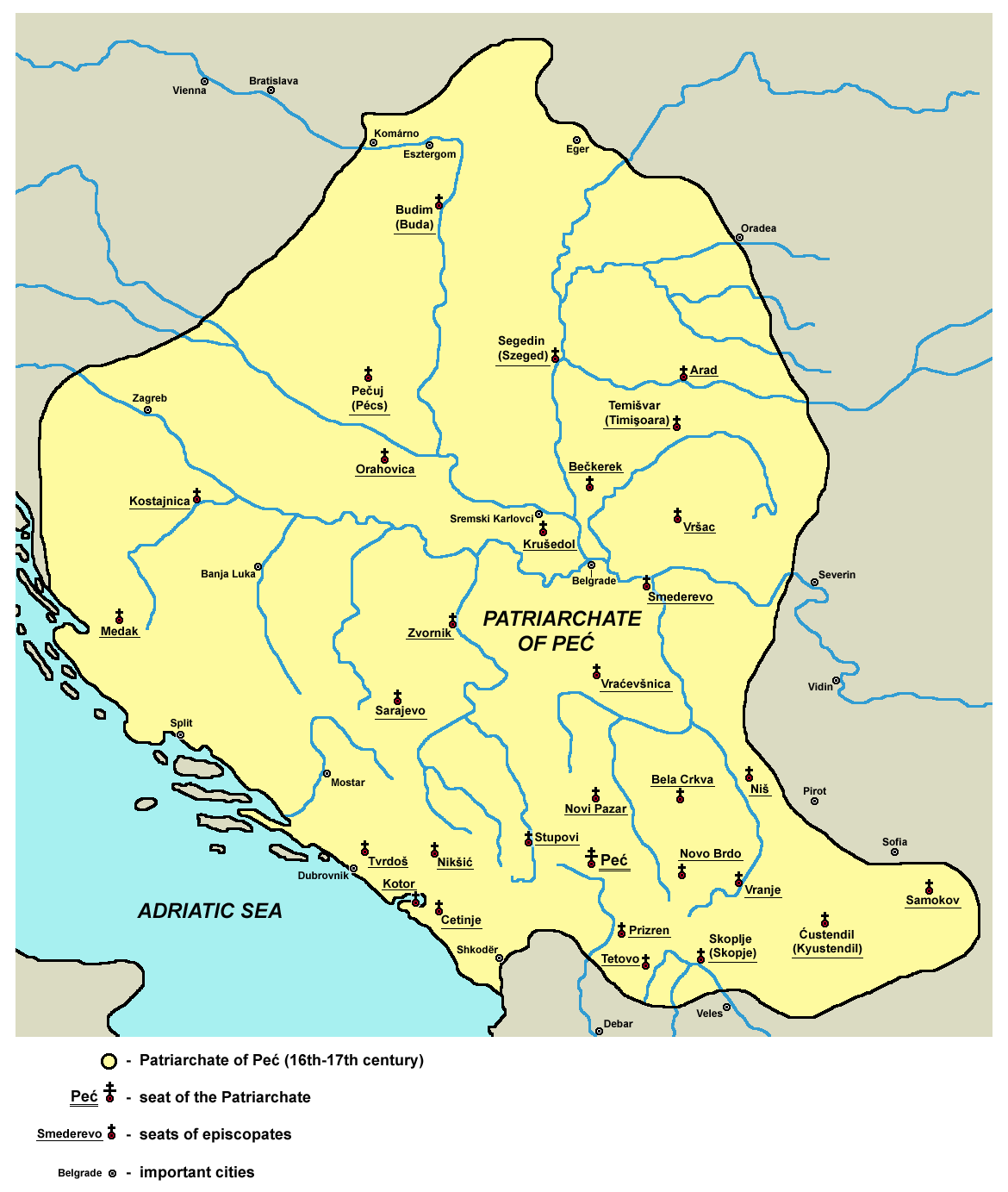
Jurisdiction of the Serbian Patriarchate of Peć

In 1346, Serbian Archbishopric was raised to the rank of patriarchate with its see remaining at Patriarchate of Peć Monastery. At the same time the eparchies of Prizren and Lipljan were raised by title to the rank of metropolitanates. Bishops of Lipljan kept under their jurisdiction the region of central Kosovo with Gračanica and Novo Brdo. Period from the beginning of 13th century to the end of 14th century was the golden age for the Serbian Orthodoxy in the regions of Raška, Kosovo, and Metohija with many monasteries and churches built by Serbian rulers and local Serbian nobility.

In the time of Ottoman conquests, in mid-15th century, Serbian Patriarchate suffered great devastation. Regions of Raška, Kosovo, and Metohija finally fell under Ottoman rule around 1455. Serbian Patriarchate was renewed in 1557 by patriarch Makarije Sokolović. In that time (16th–17th century) on the territory of modern-day eparchy there were patriarchal see at the Patriarchate of Peć Monastery and five eparchies: Raška, Prizren, Lipljan, Vučitrn, and Hvosno. During that time, two major events tragically impacted Serbian Patriarchate in the region. In the time of Great Turkish War relations between Muslims and Christians in European provinces of Ottoman Empire were radicalized. As a result of Turkish oppression, destruction of churches and monasteries and violence against non-Muslim civilian population, Serbs and their religious leaders headed by Serbian Patriarch Arsenije III sided with Habsburgs in 1689 and again in 1737 under Serbian Patriarch Arsenije IV. In the following punitive campaigns, Ottoman forces conducted systematic atrocities against Christian population, mainly in Metohija, Kosovo, and Raška, resulting in Great Migrations of the Serbs. One of the consequences of devastation and depopulation during Austro-Turkish wars was the reorganization of local Serbian eparchies. The old Eparchy of Lipljan (with Gračanica and Novo Brdo) was merged with the Eparchy of Prizren, remaining united to this day.

=== Ecumenical Patriarchate of Constantinople ===
In 1766, the Serbian Patriarchate of Peć and all of its eparchies that were on territories under Ottoman rule were placed under the jurisdiction of the Ecumenical Patriarchate of Constantinople. During the transfer of jurisdictions, Serbian patriarchal archdiocese of Peć was abolished, and its territory was added to the Eparchy of Prizren. In 1789, that eparchy was placed under administration of metropolitan Joanikije of Raška. In 1808, the eparchies of Raška and Prizren were officially merged into the current Eparchy of Raška and Prizren. In 1894, the region of Pljevlja was also added to this eparchy.

=== Serbian Orthodox Church ===
The Ottoman rule ended in 1912, and territory of eparchy was divided between Kingdom of Serbia and Kingdom of Montenegro. Prizren became part of the Kingdom of Serbia, and Peć became part of the Kingdom of Montenegro. Political division was followed by reorganization of church administration. In the Montenegrin part, a separated Eparchy of Peć was created. During the World War I territories of both eparchies were occupied by the army of Austria-Hungary. After World War I and the creation of the Kingdom of Yugoslavia, its territory was united with other Serbian ecclesiastical provinces to form the unified Serbian Orthodox Church, a process completed in 1920. In 1931, Eparchy of Peć was reincorporated into the Eparchy of Raška and Prizren. In 1941, Yugoslavia was attacked and occupied by Nazi Germany and its allies.

The territory of the Eparchy of Raška and Prizren was occupied by Germans (northern part), Italians (central part), and Bulgarians (eastern part). The Italian occupation zone was annexed to the Italian protectorate of Albania. That marked the beginning of mass persecution of ethnic Serbs in the annexed regions of Metohija and central Kosovo. Many churches and monasteries of the Eparchy of Raška and Prizren were looted and destroyed. Reign of terror was enforced by Albanian fascist organization Balli Kombëtar and by Albanian SS Division "Skanderbeg", created by Heinrich Himmler. By the time of the re-annexation in 1944, the Serb population were expelled from Kosovo.

More than a hundred of the Eparchy's churches and monasteries were targeted for vandalism and destruction by Albanian nationalists after the Kosovo War and during the 2004 unrest in Kosovo.

The 2023 Ohrid Agreement, proposed by the European Union and agreed by reprezentatives of Serbia and Kosovo, stpulates that parties shall formalise the status of the Serbian Orthodox Church in Kosovo and afford strong level of protection to the Serbian religious and cultural heritage sites, in line with existing European models.

== List of bishops ==
=== Bishops of Ras ===
- Leontius (1123–1126)
- Cyril (1141–1143)
- Euthemius (1170)
- Callinicus (1196)

=== Bishops of Prizren ===
- Ioannis (12th century)
- Avramios (1204)
- Nicephoros (1216)

=== Metropolitans of Prizren ===
- Gavrilo (1766–1774)
- Sofronije (around 1780)
- Jevsevije (died 1789)
- Joanikije (administrator) (1789–1808)

=== Metropolitans of Raška and Prizren ===
- Joanikije (1789–1818)
- Zaharija (1819–1830)
- Ananije (1830–1836)
- German (1836–1838)
- Sinesije (1838–1840)
- Ignjatije (1840–1849)
- Partenije (1849–1854)
- Melentije Spandonidis (1854–1895)
- Dionisije Petrović (1896–1900)
- Nićifor Perić (1901–1911)
- Gavrilo Dožić (1912–1920)

=== Bishops of Raška and Prizren ===
- Mihajlo Šiljak (1920–1928)
- Serafim Jovanović (1928–1945)
- Vladimir Rajić (administrator) (1945–1947)
- Vladimir Rajić (1947–1956)
- Pavle Stojčević (1957–1990)
- Artemije Radosavljević (1991–2010)
- Atanasije Jevtić (administrator) (2010)
- Amfilohije Radović (administrator) (2010)
- Teodosije Šibalić (2010–present)

== Notable monasteries and churches ==
=== Monasteries ===
- Đurđevi Stupovi (1170) (World Heritage Site)
- Patriarchate of Peć (early 13th c.) (World Heritage Site)
- Sopoćani (1259) (World Heritage Site)
- Gračanica (1310) (World Heritage Site)
- Banjska (1312)
- Visoki Dečani (1327) (World Heritage Site)
- Holy Archangels (1343)
- Zočište (early 14th c.)
- Gorioč (early 14th c.)
- Sokolica (14th c.)
- Budisavci (14th c.)
- Binač (14th c.)
- Devič (1434)
- Saint Mark of Koriša (1467)

=== Churches ===
- Church of the Holy Apostles Peter and Paul (c. 820) (World Heritage Site)
- Our Lady of Ljeviš (1306) (World Heritage Site)

== Gallery ==
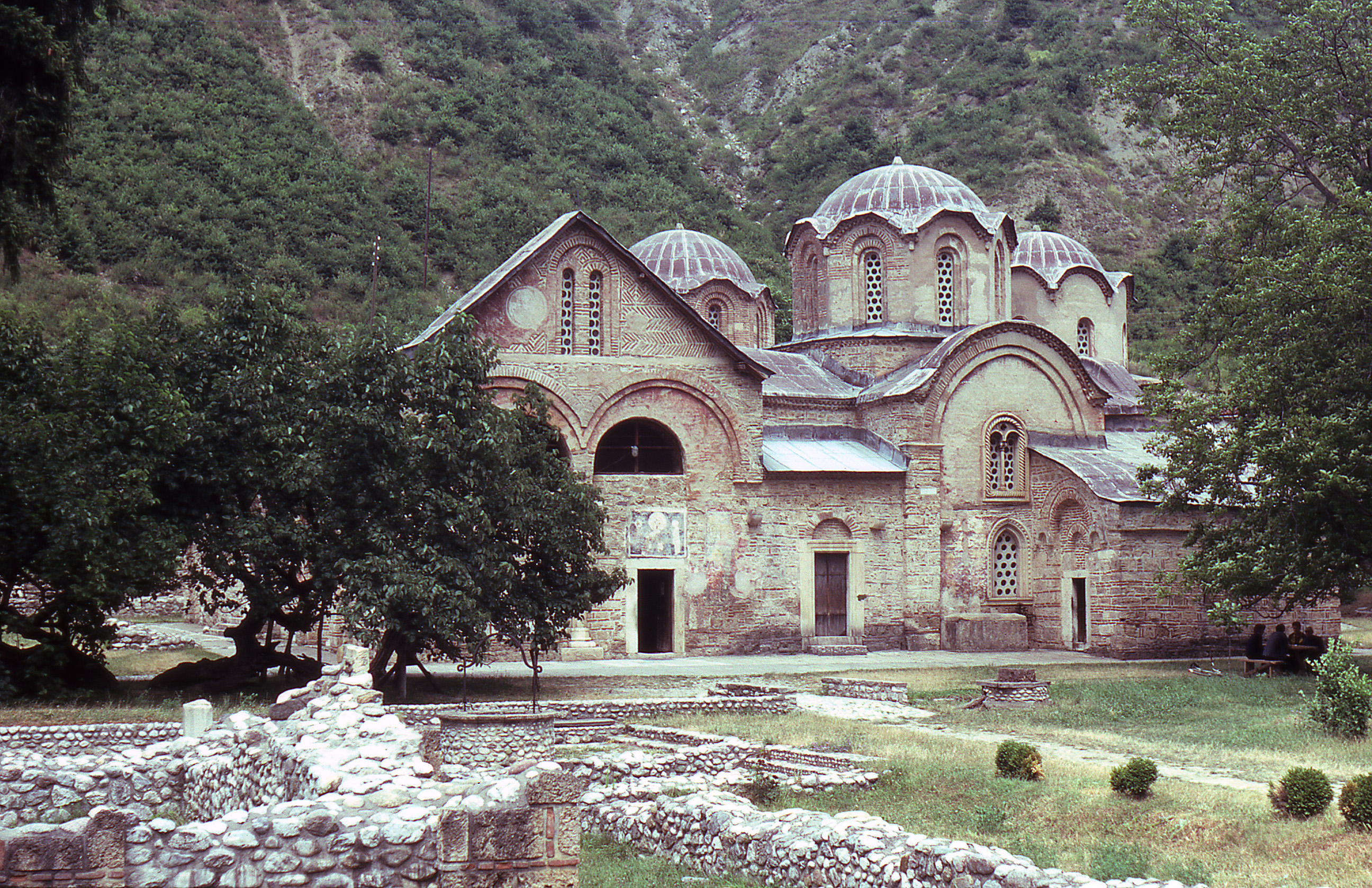
Patriarchate of Peć Monastery

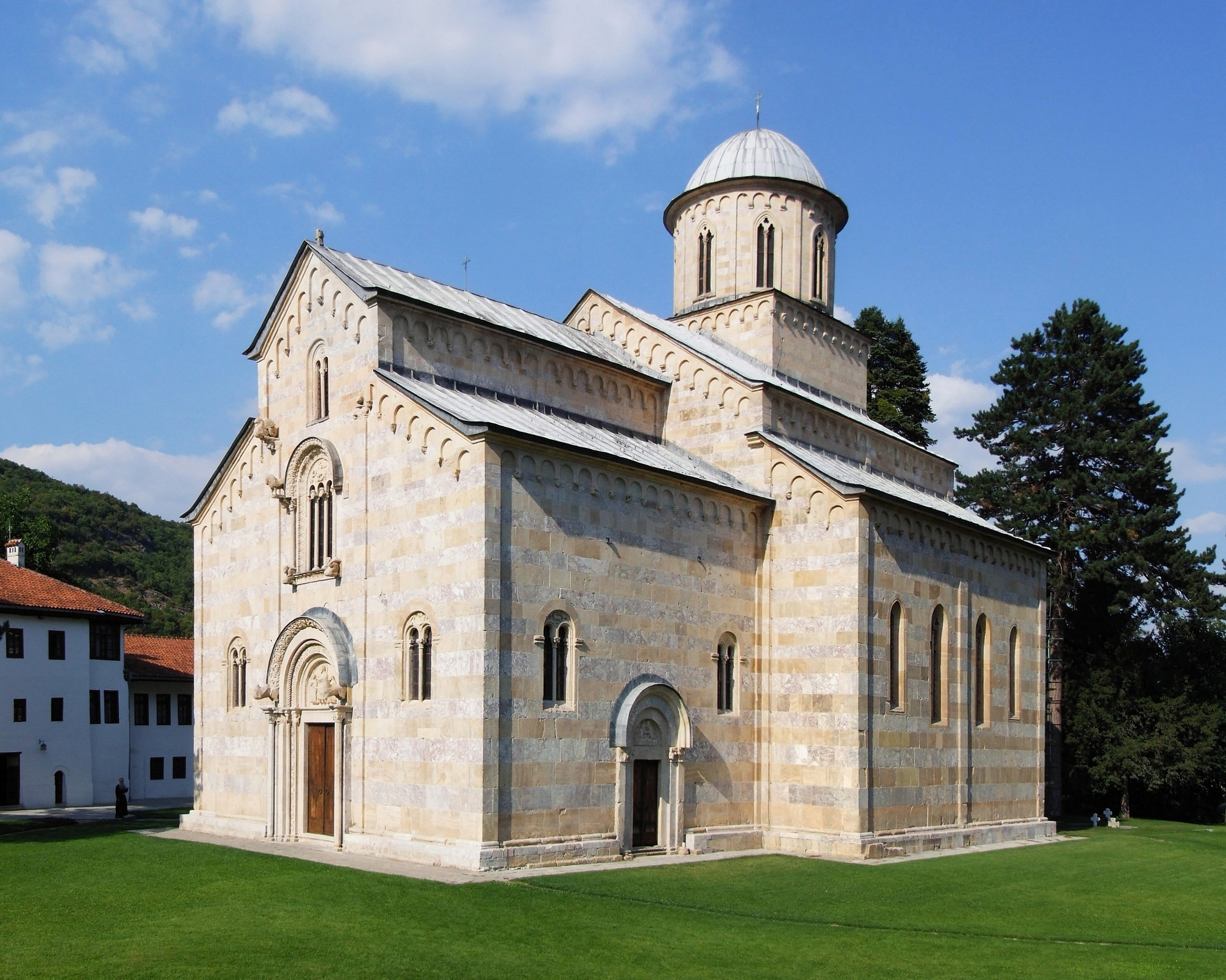
Visoki Dečani Monastery

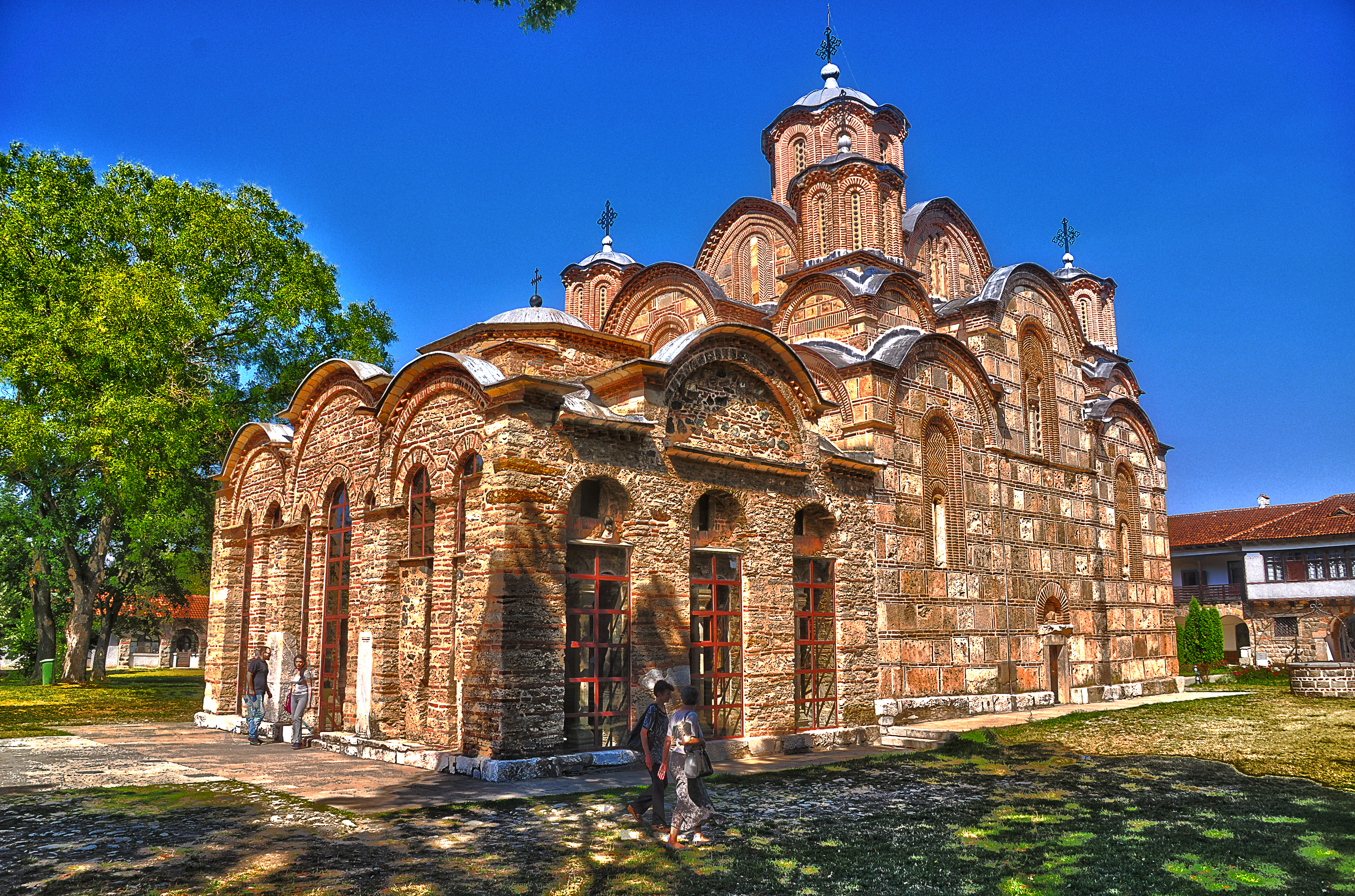
Gračanica Monastery

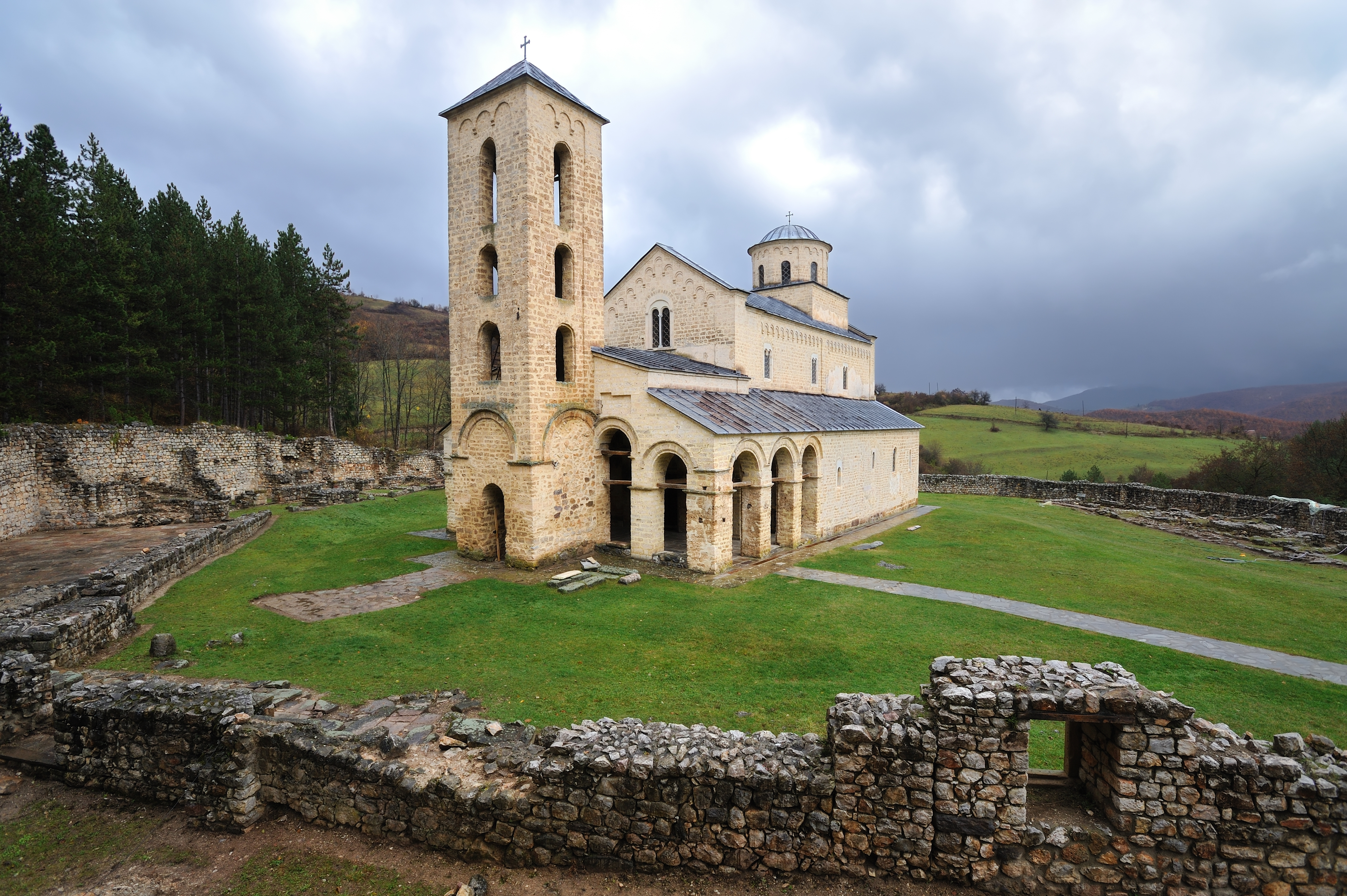
Sopoćani Monastery
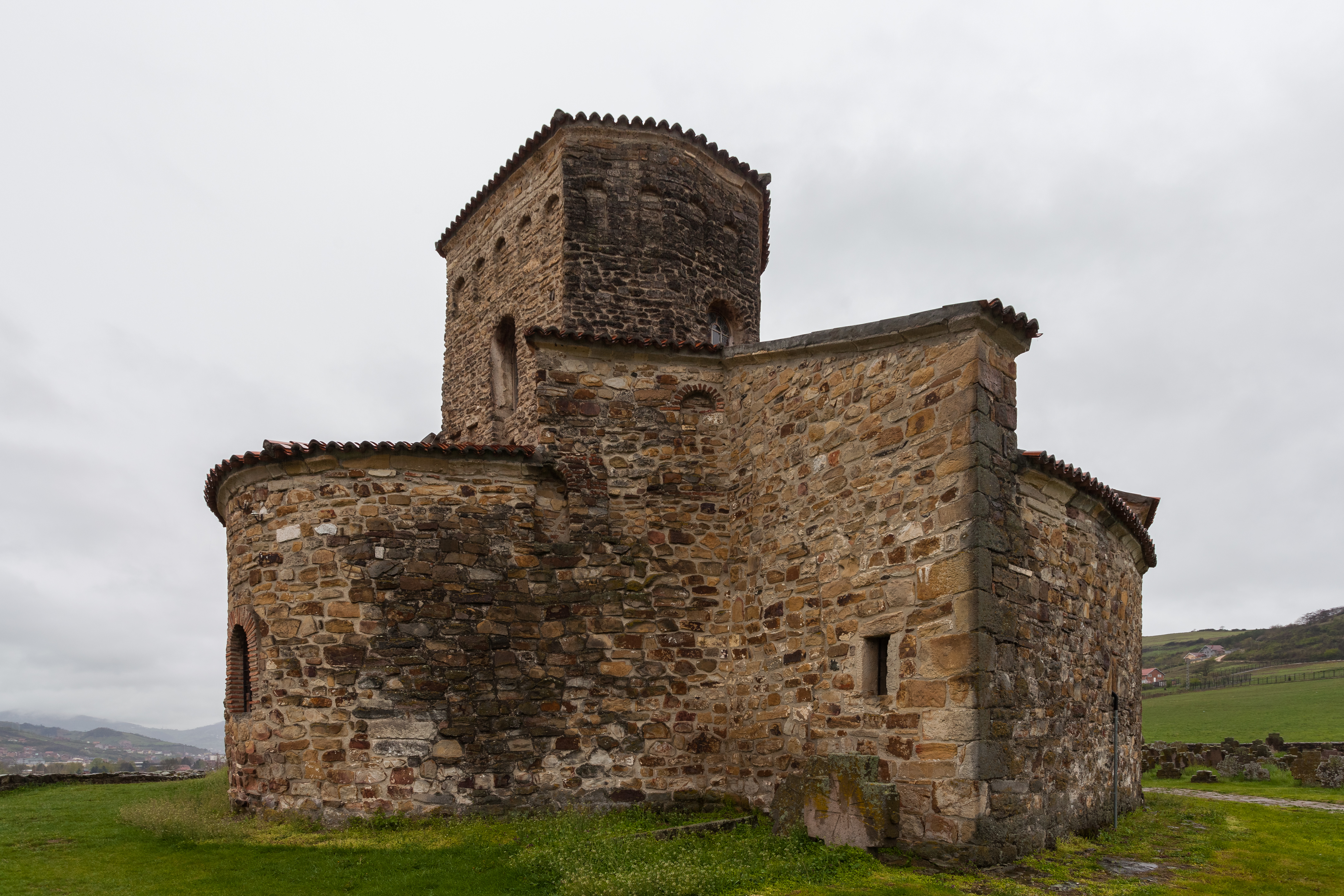
Church of the Holy Apostles Peter and Paul

Our Lady of Ljeviš Church

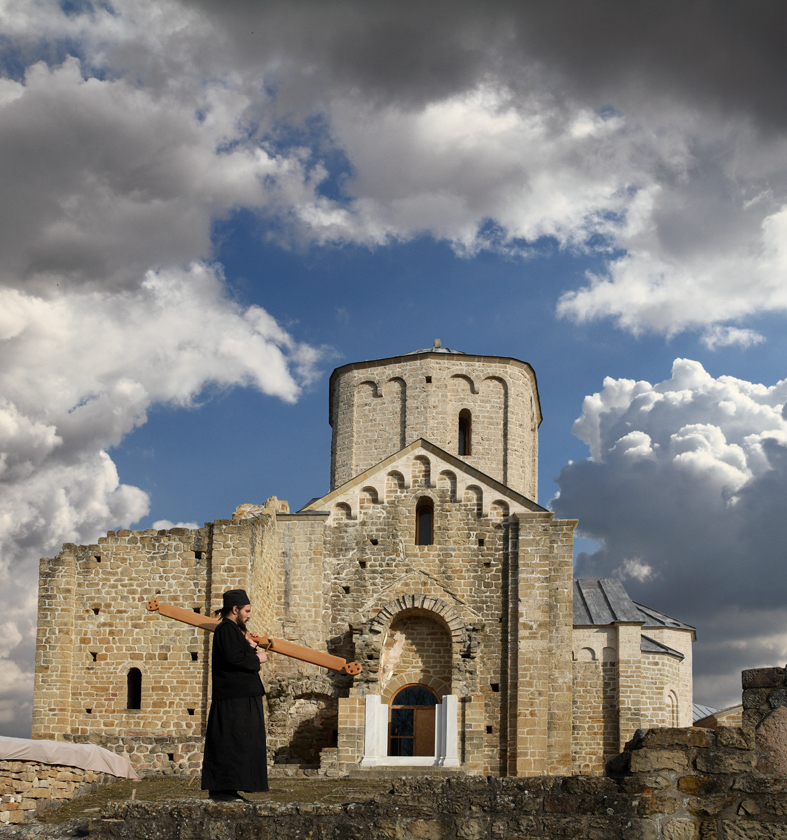
Đurđevi Stupovi Monastery

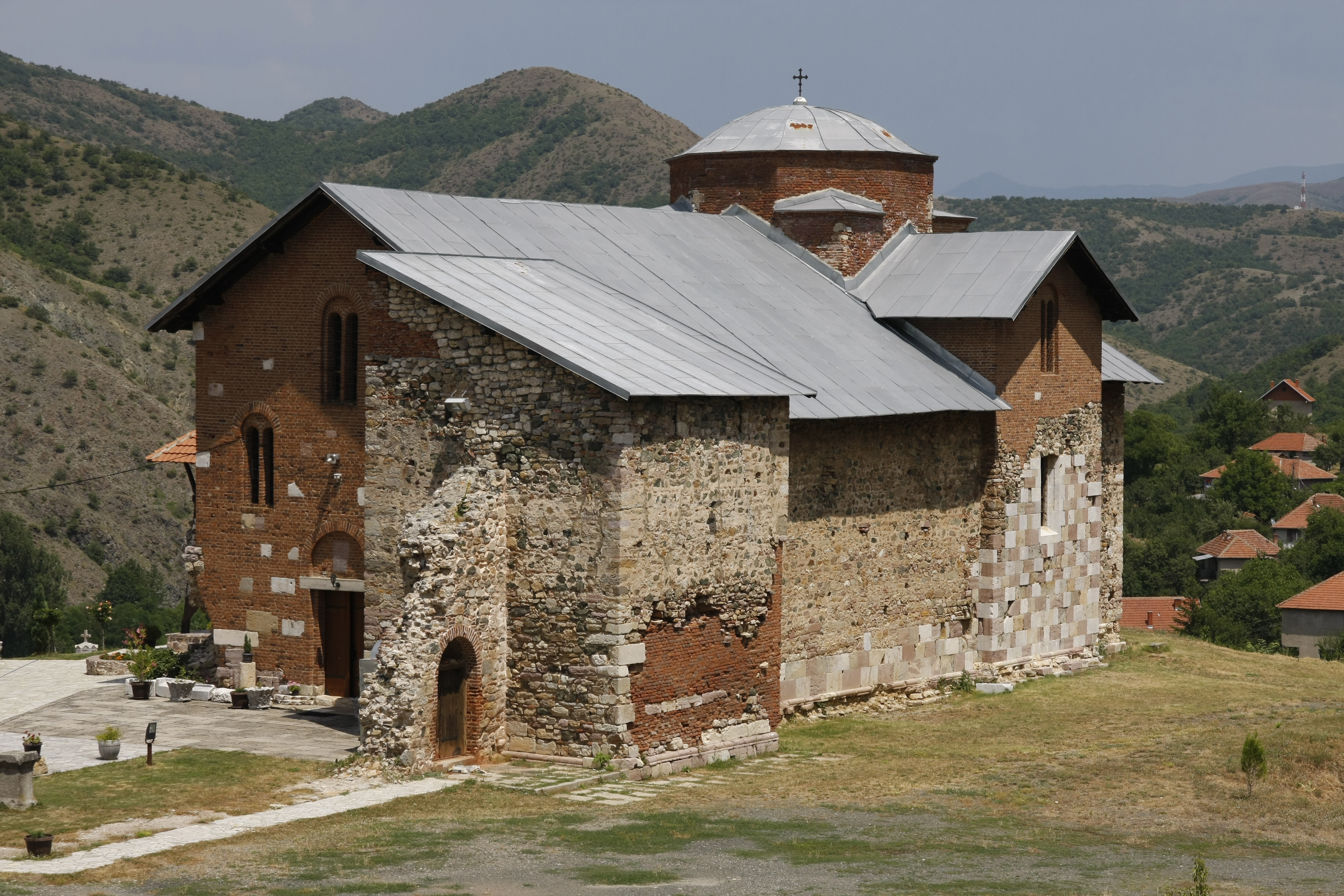
Banjska Monastery

== See also ==
- Serbian Orthodox Church in Kosovo
- Eparchies and metropolitanates of the Serbian Orthodox Church
- Saints Cyril and Methodius Serbian Orthodox Seminary
- Kosovo Serbs

== Sources ==
- Antić, Ivana, ed. (2008). Das Kloster Visoki Dečani. Dečani: Manastir Visoki Dečani.
- Bataković, Dušan T. (1992). The Kosovo Chronicles. Belgrade: Plato.
- Bataković, Dušan T. (1993). Kosovo, la spirale de la haine: Les faits, les acteurs, l'histoire (1. ed.). Lausanne: L'Age d'Homme.
- Bataković, Dušan T., ed. (2005). Histoire du peuple serbe [History of the Serbian People] (in French). Lausanne: L’Age d’Homme.
- Bataković, Dušan T., ed. (2007). Kosovo and Metohija: Living in the Enclave (PDF). Belgrade: Institute for Balkan Studies.
- Bataković, Dušan T. (2014). A Turbulent Decade: The Serbs in Post-1999 Kosovo: Destruction of Cultural Heritage, Ethnic Cleansing, and Marginalization (1999—2009). Paris: Dialogue.
- Bataković, Dušan T. (2015a). "Kosovo and Metohija: History, Memory and Identity". The Christian Heritage of Kosovo and Metohija: the Historical and Spiritual Heartland of the Serbian People. Los Angeles: Sebastian Press. pp. 569–608.
- Bataković, Dušan T. (2015b). "The Serbs of Kosovo and Metohija 1999-2007: Surviving in Ghetto-like Enclaves". The Christian Heritage of Kosovo and Metohija: the Historical and Spiritual Heartland of the Serbian People. Los Angeles: Sebastian Press. pp. 935–945.
- Bulić, Dejan (2013). "The Fortifications of the Late Antiquity and the Early Byzantine Period on the Later Territory of the South-Slavic Principalities, and their re-occupation". The World of the Slavs: Studies of the East, West and South Slavs: Civitas, Oppidas, Villas and Archeological Evidence (7th to 11th Centuries AD). Istorijski institut SANU. pp. 137–234. ISBN 9788677431044.
- Ćirković, Sima (2004). The Serbs. Malden: Blackwell Publishing.
- Curta, Florin (2001). The Making of the Slavs: History and Archaeology of the Lower Danube Region, c. 500–700. Cambridge: Cambridge University Press. ISBN 9781139428880.
- Curta, Florin (2006). Southeastern Europe in the Middle Ages, 500–1250. Cambridge: Cambridge University Press.
- Ćurčić, Slobodan (1979). Gračanica: King Milutin's Church and Its Place in Late Byzantine Architecture. Pennsylvania State University Press.
- Đorđević, Života; Pejić, Svetlana, eds. (1999). Cultural Heritage of Kosovo and Metohija. Belgrade: Institute for the Protection of Cultural Monuments of the Republic of Serbia. ISBN 9788680879161.
- Ferrari, Silvio; Benzo, Andrea (2014). Between Cultural Diversity and Common Heritage: Legal and Religious Perspectives on the Sacred Places of the Mediterranean. London & New York: Routledge. ISBN 9781317175032.
- Fine, John Van Antwerp Jr. (1994) [1987]. The Late Medieval Balkans: A Critical Survey from the Late Twelfth Century to the Ottoman Conquest. Ann Arbor, MI: University of Michigan Press.
- Fotić, Aleksandar (2008). "Serbian Orthodox Church". Encyclopedia of the Ottoman Empire. New York: Infobase Publishing. pp. 519–520. ISBN 9781438110257.
- Ivanišević, Vujadin; Krsmanović, Bojana (2013). "Byzantine seals from the Ras fortress" (PDF). Recueil des travaux de l'Institut d'études byzantines. 50 (1): 450. doi:10.2298/ZRVI1350449I.
- Ivić, Pavle, ed. (1995). The History of Serbian Culture. Edgware: Porthill Publishers. ISBN 9781870732314.
- Kalić, Jovanka (1995). "Rascia - The Nucleus of the Medieval Serbian State". The Serbian Question in the Balkans. Belgrade: Faculty of Geography. pp. 147–155.
- Katić, Tatjana (2017). "Administrative Division, Settlements and Demographics in the First Centuries of Ottoman Rule" (PDF). Artistic Heritage of the Serbian People in Kosovo and Metohija: History, Identity, Vulnerability, Protection. Belgrade: Serbian Academy of Sciences and Arts. pp. 41–48.
- Katić, Tatjana; Vučetić, Biljana (2017). "In the time of the Ottoman Empire (1455-1912)" (PDF). Artistic Heritage of the Serbian People in Kosovo and Metohija: History, Identity, Vulnerability, Protection. Belgrade: Serbian Academy of Sciences and Arts. pp. 365–377. Archived from the original on 25 January 2025.
- Kia, Mehrdad (2011). Daily Life in the Ottoman Empire. Santa Barbara, California: Greenwood Press. ISBN 9780313064029.
- Komatina, Ivana (2016). Црква и држава у српским земљама од XI до XIII века [Church and State in the Serbian Lands from the XIth to the XIIIth Century]. Београд: Institute of History. ISBN 9788677431136.
- Komatina, Predrag (2015). "The Church in Serbia at the Time of Cyrilo-Methodian Mission in Moravia". Cyril and Methodius: Byzantium and the World of the Slavs. Thessaloniki: Dimos. pp. 711–718.
- Krstić, Branislav (2003). Saving the Cultural Heritage of Serbia and Europe in Kosovo and Metohia. Belgrade: Coordination Center of the Federal Government and the Government of the Republic of Serbia for Kosovo and Metohia. ISBN 9788675560173.
- Ljubinković, Radivoje (1975). The Church of the Apostles in the Patriarchate of Peć. Belgrade: Jugoslavija.
- Marković, Miodrag; Vojvodić, Dragan, eds. (2017). Serbian Artistic Heritage in Kosovo and Metohija: Identity, Significance, Vulnerability. Belgrade: Serbian Academy of Sciences and Arts.
- McAllester, Matthew (2001). Beyond the Mountains of the Damned: The War Inside Kosovo. New York-London: New York University Press. ISBN 9780814756614.
- Mileusnić, Slobodan (1998) [1995]. Medieval Monasteries of Serbia (4th ed.). Novi Sad: Pravoslavna reč; Prometej.
- Pantelić, Bratislav (2002). The Architecture of Dečani and the Role of Archbishop Danilo II. Wiesbaden: Reichert. ISBN 9783895002397.
- Pavlovich, Paul (1989). The History of the Serbian Orthodox Church. Serbian Heritage Books. ISBN 9780969133124.
- Pavlowitch, Stevan K. (2002). Serbia: The History behind the Name. London: Hurst & Company. ISBN 9781850654773.
- Peić, Sava (1994). Medieval Serbian Culture. London: Alpine Fine Arts Collection.
- Petković, Sreten (1982). The Patriarchate of Peć. Belgrade: Serbian Patriarchate.
- Petković, Vesna; Peić, Sava (2013). Serbian Medieval Cultural Heritage. Belgrade: Dereta.
- Popović, Marko (1999). Tvrđava Ras [The Fortress of Ras] (in Serbian). Belgrade: Archaeological Institute. ISBN 9788680093147.
- Popović, Svetlana (2002). "The Serbian Episcopal sees in the thirteenth century". Starinar. 51 (2001): 171–184.
- Ракочевић, Новица (1983). "Политичке и друштвене прилике". Историја српског народа. Vol. књ. 6, св. 1. Београд: Српска књижевна задруга. pp. 263–290.
- Samardžić, Radovan; Duškov, Milan, eds. (1993). Serbs in European Civilization. Belgrade: Nova, Serbian Academy of Sciences and Arts, Institute for Balkan Studies. ISBN 9788675830153.
- Sotirović, Vladislav B. (2011). "The Serbian Patriarchate of Peć in the Ottoman Empire: The First Phase (1557–94)" (PDF). Serbian Studies. 25 (2): 143–169. Archived from the original (PDF) on 10 August 2016.
- Stephenson, Paul (2000). Byzantium's Balkan Frontier: A Political Study of the Northern Balkans, 900–1204. Cambridge: Cambridge University Press. ISBN 9780521770170.
- Stephenson, Paul (2003). The Legend of Basil the Bulgar-slayer. Cambridge University Press. ISBN 9780521815307.
- Stephenson, Paul (2003a). "The Balkan Frontier in the Year 1000". Byzantium in the year 1000. BRILL. pp. 109–134. ISBN 9004120971.
- Subotić, Gojko (1998). Art of Kosovo: The Sacred Land. New York: The Monacelli Press. ISBN 9781580930062.
- Šuletić, Nebojša (2017). "Under Ottoman Rule: Until the End of the 18th Century". Artistic Heritage of the Serbian People in Kosovo and Metohija: History, Identity, Vulnerability, Protection. Belgrade: Serbian Academy of Sciences and Arts. pp. 31–39.
- Šakota, Mirjana (2017). Ottoman Chronicles: Dečani Monastery Archives. Prizren: Diocese of Raška-Prizren.
- Špehar, Perica N. (2010). "By Their Fruit you will recognize them - Christianization of Serbia in Middle Ages". Tak więc po owocach poznacie ich. Poznań: Stowarzyszenie naukowe archeologów Polskich. pp. 203–220.
- Špehar, Perica N. (2019). "Reocupation of the Late Antique Fortifications on the central Balkans during the Early Middle Ages". Fortifications, Defence Systems, Structures, and Features in the Past. Zagreb: Institute of Archaeology.
- Točanac-Radović, Isidora (2022). "The Great Migration of Serbs and the Question of the Serbian Ethnic and Religious Community in the Habsburg Monarchy". Migrations in the Slavic Cultural Space: From the Middle Ages to the Present Day. Łódź: Łódź University Press. pp. 15–27.
- Todić, Branislav (1999). Serbian Medieval Painting: The Age of King Milutin. Belgrade: Draganić. ISBN 9788644102717.
- Todić, Branislav; Čanak-Medić, Milka (2013). The Dečani Monastery. Belgrade: Museum in Priština. ISBN 9788651916536.
- Tomasevich, Jozo (2001). War and Revolution in Yugoslavia, 1941–1945: Occupation and Collaboration. Vol. 2. San Francisco: Stanford University Press. ISBN 9780804779241.
- Vlasto, Alexis P. (1970). The entry of the Slavs into Christendom. Cambridge University Press. ISBN 9780521074599.
- Živković, Tibor; Bojanin, Stanoje; Petrović, Vladeta, eds. (2000). Selected Charters of Serbian Rulers (XII-XV Century): Relating to the Territory of Kosovo and Metohia. Athens: Center for Studies of Byzantine Civilisation.
- Živković, Tibor (2008). Forging unity: The South Slavs between East and West 550-1150. Belgrade: The Institute of History, Čigoja štampa. ISBN 9788675585732.
- Živković, Tibor (2013a). "On the Baptism of the Serbs and Croats in the Time of Basil I (867–886)" (PDF). Studia Slavica et Balcanica Petropolitana (1): 33–53.
- Živković, Tibor (2013b). "The Urban landscape of Early Medieval Slavic Principalities in the Territories of the Former Praefectura Illyricum and in the Province of Dalmatia (ca. 610-950)". The World of the Slavs: Studies of the East, West and South Slavs: Civitas, Oppidas, Villas and Archeological Evidence (7th to 11th Centuries AD). pp. 15–36.
