= Gruža =

Gruža may refer to:

- Gruža, region in Serbia.
- Gruža, village in Serbia.
- Gruža, river in Serbia.
- Gruža Lake, lake in Serbia.
