= Crna Reka Monastery =

Serbian Orthodox monastery in Serbia

- Манастир Црна река
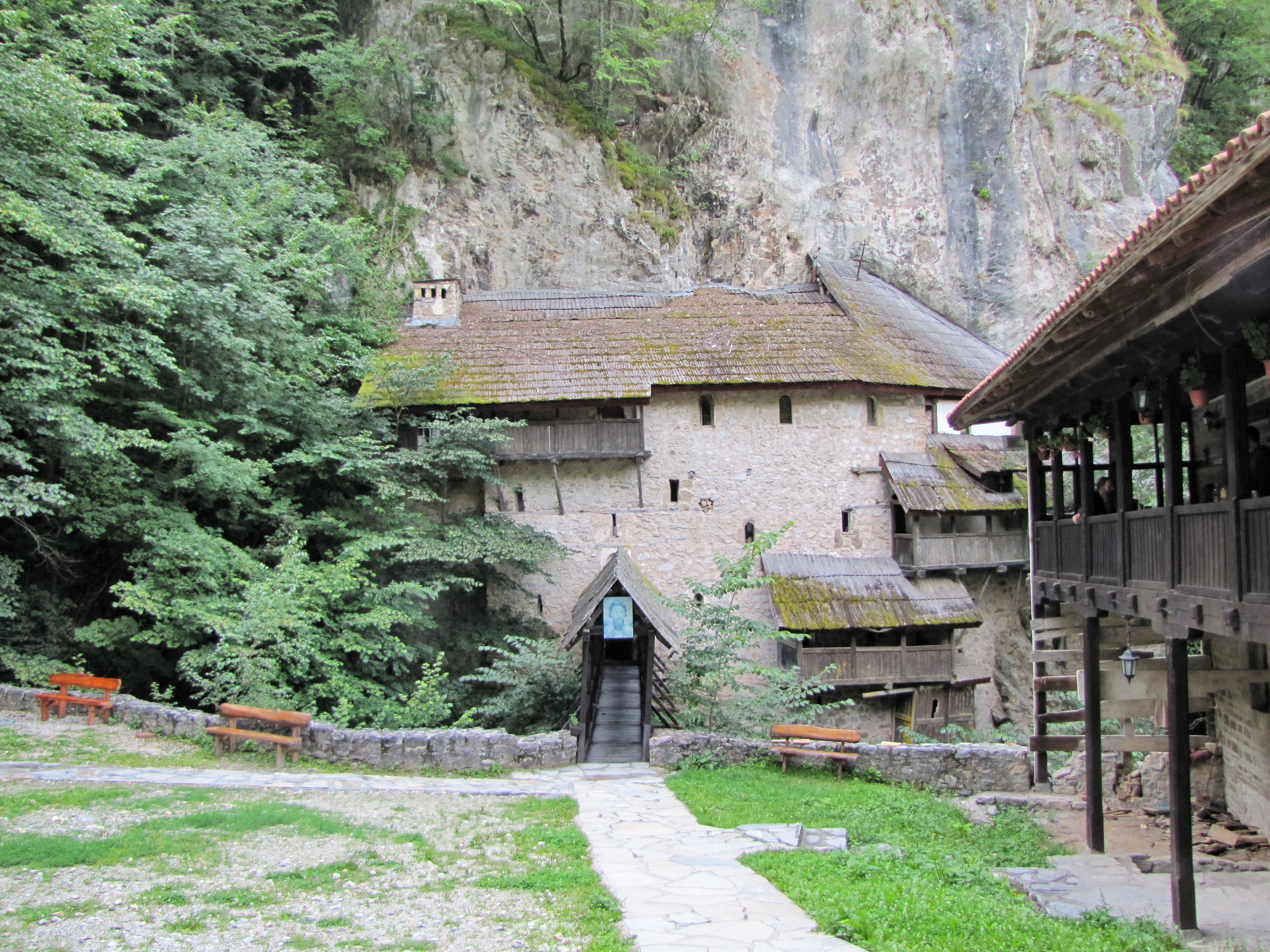
- View of the Crna Reka Monastery
- Interactive map of Crna Reka Monastery

Monastery information
- Order: Serbian Orthodox
- Denomination: Eastern Orthodox
- Established: 13th century
- Diocese: Eparchy of Raška and Prizren

People
- Founder: Princess Milica of Serbia
- Abbot: Sava Janjić

Architecture
- Style: Serbo-Byzantine

Site
- Location: Ribariće, Tutin
- Country: Serbia
- Coordinates: 42.946944°N 20.468333°E

Cultural Heritage of Serbia
- Official name: Манастир Црна река
- Type: Monument of Culture of Great Importance

The Crna Reka Monastery (Serbian: Манастир Црна река, romanized: Manastir Crna reka) is a monastic hermitage located in the mountains of southern Central Serbia, in Ribariće, situated in the gorge of the Crna Reka (Black River). The monastery is located in the village of Ribariće and belongs to the Eparchy of Raška and Prizren of the Serbian Orthodox Church. As a whole, it represents an immovable cultural property as a Monument of Culture of Great Importance. Despite its exceptional beauty and significance, the Crna Reka Monastery was long almost unknown outside its immediate surroundings. Only recently, with the construction of a bridge on Gazivoda Lake near Ribariće and the repair of the approach road, the Crna Reka Monastery, as a rare jewel of Serbian medieval culture, is emerging from the relative anonymity in which it has existed for a full 700 years. The monastery is active, male, and cared for by monks.

In the monastery are the relics of Saint Peter of Koriša, one of the well-known Serbian ascetics from the 13th century. There is a cave in the monastery where the church is situated; in that cave, there is a stone depression where water collects drop by drop. The water is, as believers say, healing, and especially helps with eye diseases, which is why the people call it the "water of the Holy Archangel Michael".

There is another holy relic in the monastery that attracts great attention from believers, and that is the grave of the venerable martyr Hariton Lukić, a former brother of Crna Reka. The venerable martyr Hariton Lukić, a brother of the Monastery of the Holy Archangels near Prizren, was martyred by Kosovo Liberation Army terrorists in the vicinity of Prizren on June 15, 1999.

== Location ==
The Crna Reka Monastery is located near the village of Ribariće, between Novi Pazar and Tutin. The M-22 main road (Ibar Highway) leads to Ribariće, and buses from larger cities in Serbia also pass through the village. The monastery is situated in Ibar Kolašin, in the gorge of the Crna Reka, in the most remote area of southwestern Serbia, on the border with Montenegro. It is surrounded by high rocks and lush century-old forests. It dates back to the thirteenth century, when a small church dedicated to Saint Archangel Michael was built in a large cave above the bed of the Crna Reka. Soon, ascetic monks built their cells around the church, walled up the cave, and erected a small wooden drawbridge over the dry riverbed. The river sinks just above the monastery and emerges from the ground again after a few hundred meters of its underwater course. In the 15th century, the famous ascetic Saint Joanikije of Devič lived in the monastery with his monks. The saint later moved to the Drenica region, where his relics are still kept today in the Devič monastery. The venerable Peter of Koriša stayed in the monastery for a short time.

== History ==
The church of the Crna Reka monastery is dedicated to Saint Archangel Michael, although it can be found in manuscript records that it is dedicated to the Holy Archangels.

It is mentioned in the prologue hagiography of Saint Joanikije of Devič, written probably shortly after the death of this ascetic and his canonization as a saint, and preserved in copies dating from the 18th century.

Since the relics of Saint Peter of Koriša were transferred there, the monastery celebrates Petrovdan (June 29, or July 12 according to the new calendar), which became the monastery's patron saint day and a large folk gathering, assembling numerous believers and admirers. Even today, unfortunately, the exact time of the monastery's creation is unknown. Some scholars believe that the cave church could have originated as early as the era of the Nemanjić dynasty. Dating it furthest into the past is Stojan Novaković, who, speaking of the transfer of the relics of Simeon Nemanja from Hilandar to Serbia, says that the path led "certainly via the Crna Reka monastery in Ibar". This means that the monastery existed at the very beginning of the 13th century. Speaking of the Serbian churches of Saint Archangel, Mirjana Ćorović-Ljubinković asserts that the church in Crna Reka was built by Archbishop Danilo II. Such an opinion implies that the monastery originated sometime in the first half of the 14th century. Folk tradition ties the construction of the monastery to the period after the Battle of Kosovo. Ljubomir Stojanović believes it originated in the 14th century or 15th century. Mila Vulović places the creation of the monastery at the end of the 15th or the beginning of the 16th century, while Hilferding states that the monastery was built by Saint Joanikije of Devič, who asceticized in Crna Reka. His hagiography says that he built the church, formed the monastery, and gathered enough disciples. It is assumed that he had to learn from someone that a suitable place for hermitage existed there, which he could only have found out from those who had already attempted such asceticism. Radomir Stanić states that the similarities of this and other Serbian cave monasteries of the Middle Ages indicate that it dates from an earlier time than what certain data suggest. The lack of such data still leaves the exact origin of this extremely important monastery an open question for scholars. There is almost no data about its history until the second half of the 17th century. What happened in it from the arrival of Saint Joanikije in Devič (which could have happened sometime at the end of the 14th century), until this time, can only be guessed. The oldest record is linked to the year of the creation of the iconostasis, which was completed in 1601 during the time of abbot hieromonk Đenadije. The founders and the brotherhood were engaged in this work. After that, there is no mention of the monastery until 1666, when the Crna Reka hieromonk Gervasije passed away. In 1687, the relics of Stefan the First-Crowned were transferred to Crna Reka, certainly because it was safer for them there. They were there for nine years, after which, as noted by the very sinful hieromonk Misail, they were transferred to the Studenica Monastery.

In 1709, a menaion was copied in the monastery, and in 1714, a panegyric. During the time of abbot Maksim Dobrojević, sometime in the second decade of the 18th century, there was a school in the monastery. The names of two attendees are preserved: priest Sava, from Vitanovac near Kraljevo, and Mijat, from Herceg Novi. The mentioned hieromonk Misail, as the ecclesiarch of Crna Reka, renewed the shroud of Stefan the First-Crowned in 1705. By arriving in Crna Reka, abbot Maksim exhibited great activity on the economic front as well. In 1714, with his own effort and expense, he built a watermill and a fulling mill, which he donated "to the holy archistrategos Michael to serve this church for his soul." In the same year, Maksim's former brother, Georgije Dobrilovac, visited the monastery, and in 1727, hieromonk Georgije Bakovič, who two years earlier had been in Gračanica, where he signed as a "sinful priest". The Islamized Vučetićs from the nearby village of Crniš, of Hoti origin, carried out an attack on the monastery and its property in 1731: "they did not pay, they took some on God's justice, and with great zulm (oppression)." Turkish oppression was also recorded in 1763. Around Christmas that year, two Turks were killed, while abbot Maksim fled wounded to Mount Athos. (Note: The nearby monastery of Promeće is also mentioned in the record.) For the first time, it was recorded that the monastery was deserted. Priest Jeremija Arsenijević Belopoljac built the monastery fountain in 1793. Three years later, a certain hieromonk Nikodim donated a hagiography to the church, and a certain Jablan bound a candelabrum in the same year. In 1798, the icon of the Mother of God was painted. The monastery was burned by the Turks in the 18th century. It is assumed that this could have been around 1763, when massive Turkish oppression ruled and when sources record that it was abandoned.

The 18th century does not abound with data about life in the monastery either. It was only recorded in 1870 that Savo Gačanin from Kotor donated a reliquary for Saint Peter, which was built by Josif Savin. Four years later, hieromonk Ananije Milovanović renewed the church, the lodgings, the bridge on Suvovar (the dry part of the Crna Reka bed, which sinks above and emerges below the monastery), and made a basket for books. When Alexander Hilferding visited the monastery in 1867, he noted that these books had suffered considerably from moisture. At the end of the century, a school began to operate in Crna Reka. There are testimonies that the monastery in this century was, among other things, the seat of the Russian deputy, the consul from Kosovska Mitrovica, the consul of the Kingdom of Serbia, and the Kingdom of Montenegro. The Sopoćani Memorial contains a large number of undated records mentioning benefactors from surrounding places, among whom are members of the Muslim population from the nearby village of Crniš. (Note: Some of these records were published by Branislav Todić.)

== Monasticism and clergy ==
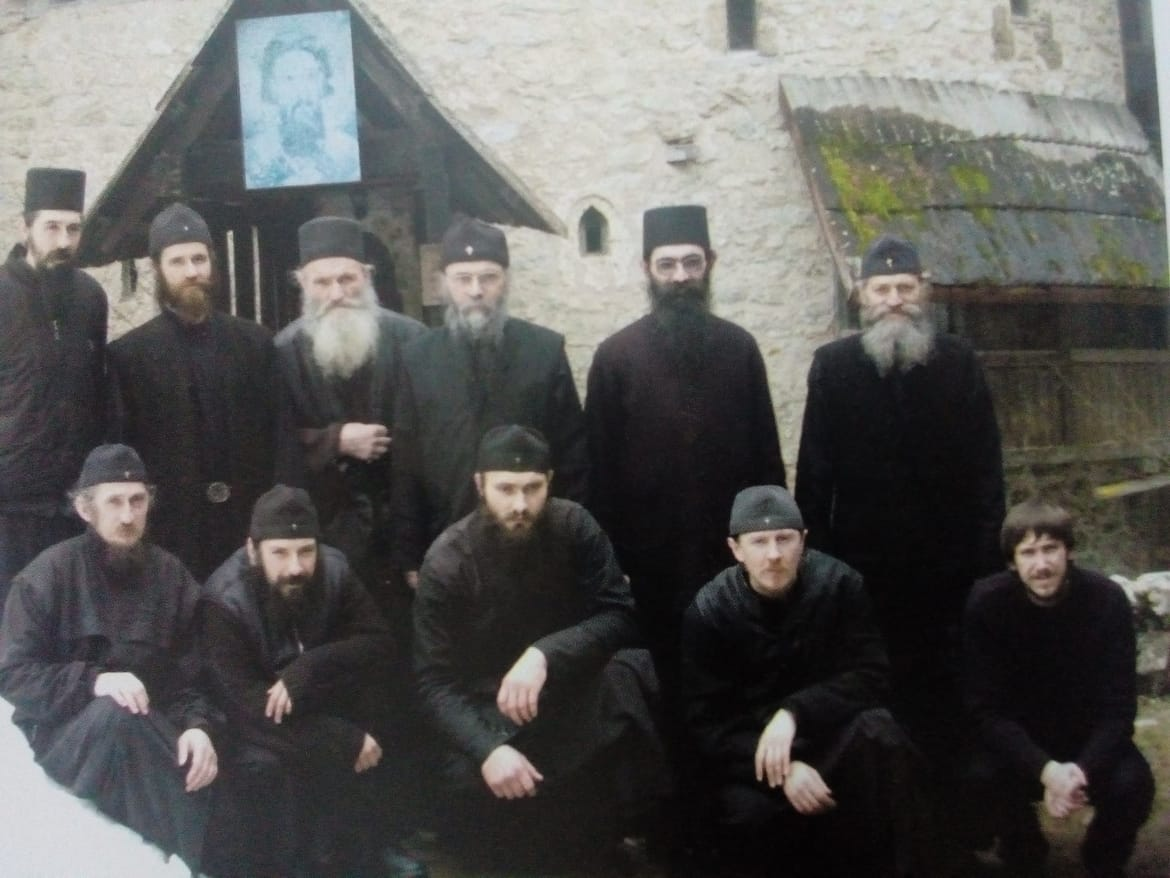
The Crna Reka brotherhood during the time of abbot Nikolaj

The monastery and its surroundings are far from roads and travelers, making it exceptionally suitable for monastic life and hesychasm. The first Crna Reka ascetic, who is reliably known, is Saint Joanikije, later called Devički (of Devič). (Note: As far as is known, St. Joanikije is called Crnorečki in only one place. Nikanor Ružić in his History of the Serbian Church II states that "in the menologium of a manuscript gospel, written in 1329, stands in the row of other saints also: Joanikije Črnorecki under April 26". Đorđe Sp. Radojičić believes that this is Archbishop Joanikije I, and not Janićije of Devič.) He, most likely, came to Crna Reka sometime at the end of the 14th century, where he devoted himself to strict monastic life. He spent some time there, becoming a teacher to young monks who came to him. Regarding the cave where Saint Joanikije practiced asceticism, Petar Kostić writes at the beginning of the 20th century: "From the place where this is seen, and further on, there is a small space and within it a place in the stone, where Saint Janićije of Devič sat and prayed to God. It is well known where he held his right and left shoulder, because the stone is carved out, from which a little clear water flows. This place is considered holy, and a vigil lamp burns there constantly. To the left of that place, an underground corridor is also seen, which is — according to stories — very long and leads to the top of the hill. They say, through this corridor Saint Janićije went out to the hill, looked for food and hid in dangerous moments. To verify if this underground corridor really leads to the top of the hill, they let a rooster inside, and it came out through this corridor and crowed at the top of the hill". In the vicinity, there are also many other caves where ascetics lived. When monks and common people started coming to Saint Joanikije, he, for the sake of monastic silence, left Crna Reka and returned to Devič. It is certain that in the 15th and 16th centuries, in the times of Turkish invasions, the monastery, as a hidden place, had its abbots and monks. One of the first abbots known is hieromonk Đenadije, during whose time the iconostasis was finished in 1601. The recorder who noted the completion of the work on the iconostasis also notes the help of the brethren on that job. It was probably during the time of this abbot that the fresco painting of the church and the last works on it were finished. At that time, painter monks stayed in the monastery, working on the church's frescoes, among them certainly Zograf Longin and his assistants Petronije and Roman. (Note: Longin's name and the names of his assistants were discovered on the Crna Reka frescoes by Radomir Petrović.)

Long after this, there are no preserved records of monastic life. Only in 1666 is it recorded that hieromonk Gervasije passed away. The Crna Reka monks guarded the relics of Stefan the First-Crowned for nine years, from 1687 to 1696, among them hieromonk Misail, who also signed as the ecclesiarch of Crna Reka. One of the abbots, about whom slightly more data is preserved, is hieromonk Maksim Dobrojević. This "humble monk" was a brother of the Dobrilovina Monastery, located on the Tara river, about fifteen kilometers from Mojkovac. Born in Bistrica, a village in the immediate vicinity of the monastery, he is one of those Dobrilovina monks who "had certain activities and reputation in other areas as well". The time of Maksim's abbotship in Crna Reka can freely be called a great spiritual and material restoration of the monastery. His arrival here was certainly not accidental. It was counted on that this learned and enterprising spiritual father would initiate many activities in hidden Crna Reka that could not be organized where the Turkish presence was significant and frequent. Therefore, he also founded a school for monks and priests, which gathered attendees from distant regions, such as Herceg Novi, Vitanovac near Kraljevo, and the Jagodina area. Of course, there were also students from surrounding places and monasteries. Along with the school, a copying workshop operated. It has already been mentioned that he built a fulling mill and a watermill. Even today, near the monastery, there are foundations of several old watermills. Perhaps one of them is Maksim's. Besides that, in 1763, he worked on the restoration of the monastery, cells, dining room, and what is particularly interesting, the semantron. All this bothered the Turks of Novi Pazar, who committed a great atrocity around Christmas. The clash in the monastery must have been serious, because two Turks were killed, and abbot Maksim received five wounds. Because of this, he had to flee to Mount Athos, and Crna Reka, perhaps for the first time, became deserted.

In 1731, abbot Vasilije and ecclesiarch Teofil stayed in Crna Reka. They witnessed the attack on the monastery carried out by the Vučetićs from Crniš. It is not believed that Vasilije was the abbot of Crna Reka. It is assumed that he was only a guest in this monastery, as such visits were not rare. Hieromonk Maksim Dobrojević was most likely the abbot until 1763, when he had to flee the monastery. In a record from this year, it says, as precisely read by Vatroslav Jagić: "there was the chief (superior) Maksim". He was certainly so well-known that the recorder did not find it necessary to mention his surname. In any case, abbot Maksim Dobrojević remains one of the most significant Crna Reka spiritual leaders, who even in the hardest times, besides agility, showed exceptional courage. It is not known how long the monastery was empty. Its next known abbot is hieromonk kir Sofronije, who could be Maksim's successor. He is first mentioned in 1793, when a fountain was built during his time. Through his effort, the icon of the Most Holy Mother of God was painted in 1796, which is still an integral part of the Crna Reka iconostasis today. Besides icons being painted and the fountain built, during his time a gospel was bound (by the effort of priest Aleksije) and a candelabrum, and books were donated. There is no data on until when kir Sofronije was abbot. He surely died or left the monastery before 1857, when only priest Stevan was in it. After him, the superior was hieromonk Ananije Milovanović, born in the village of Dmitrova Reka, in the Pazar nahiya, who was tonsured at the Devič monastery. He is first mentioned in Crna Reka in 1870, and in 1874 he carried out a major restoration in the monastery.

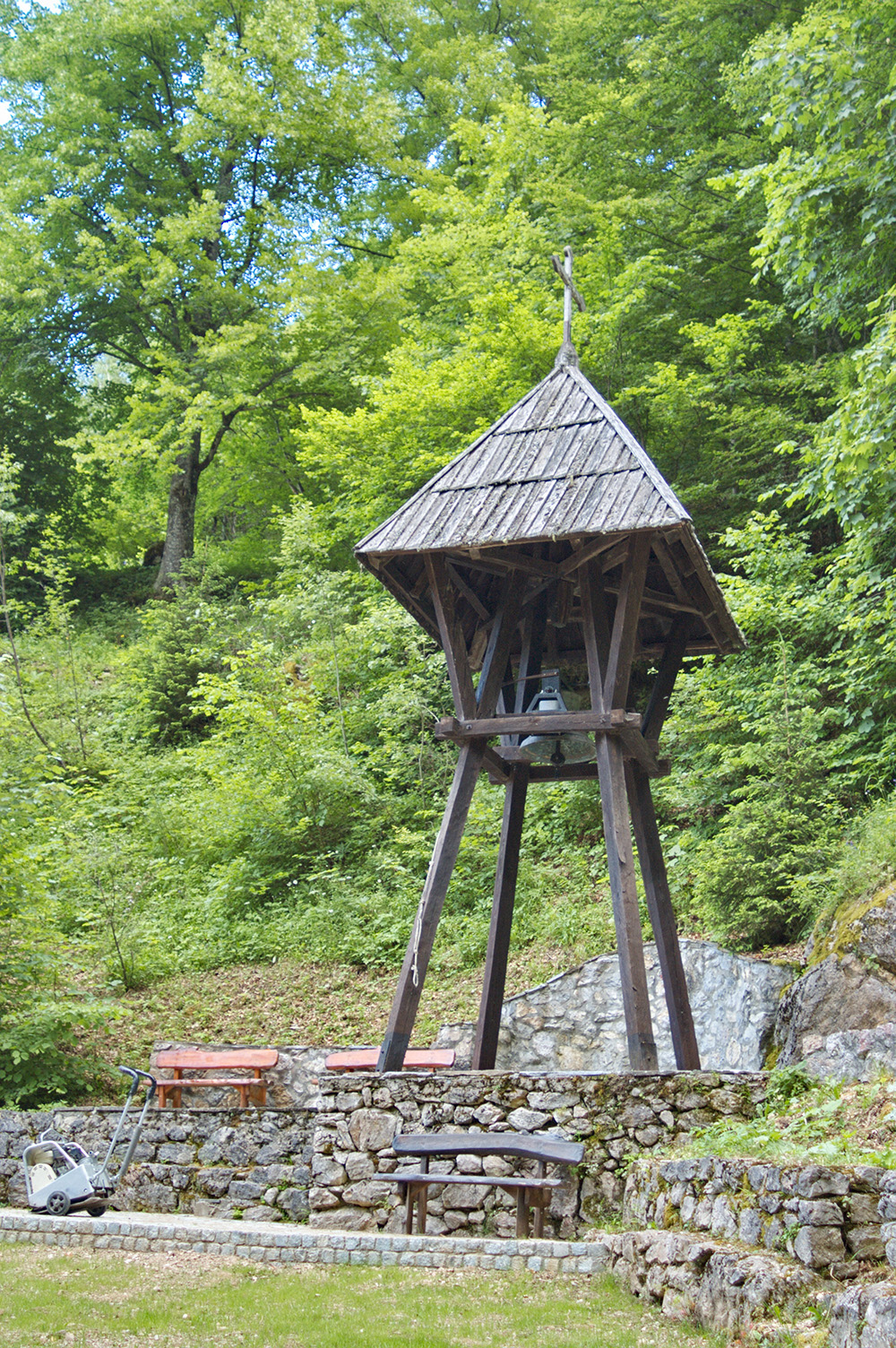
Bell in the monastery courtyard

The names of some other Crna Reka monks are known. In the Sopoćani Memorial, among the Crna Reka hieromonks, Grigorije, Simeon, Joanikije, and Nikanor are mentioned (fol. 16). On the wall of the church in Crkolez, there is an engraved record from 1860 by the Crna Reka monk Porfirije. Radomir Petrović believes that this Porfirije could be the superior of the monastery after kir Sofronije. The superiors of the monastery were sometimes priests as well. One of them is priest Jerotije Stanić, born in nearby Brnjak. This respected and enterprising priest obtained permission from the Turkish authorities in 1891 for schools to operate in Brnjak and Crna Reka. Seven years later, he built a lodging (konak), which served as a school and a boarding house for students. At the time when Petar Kostić visited the monastery, he was also the superior and was 78 years old. He died in 1899, and was succeeded by his son, priest Pavle Stanić, who had lived in Novi Pazar before that. Having become the superior of the Crna Reka monastery and the parish priest of the Oklace parish, he settled in Oklace with the famous host Gligorije Stanić. Since he had no children, he educated and employed Gligorije's son Zarija. He died under strange circumstances on September 27, 1913. He was succeeded by Zarija Stanić, who was supposed to move to Kuršumlija the next day. Apart from him, the following priests also performed parish duties in Crna Reka: Arsenije Popović, Ratko Đurić, Vukajlo Božović, Jerotije Krsmanović, Milan Popović (Velji Breg parish priest), Vlado Popović (Istok parish priest), Dimitrije Šekularac (Oklace parish priest), Uroš Popović (Dobrinje parish priest), Ilija Parlić (Vojkovce parish priest), Radule Božović (Pridvorica parish priest), Nikola Veselinović (Rudnik parish priest), and Blagoje Božović (Velji Breg parish priest). Monasticism in Crna Reka appeared again in the thirties of the last century. Hieromonk Damaskin Bošković stayed in the monastery in 1933. Before the war, the superior of the monastery was hieromonk Atanasije Mitić, who left Crna Reka in 1941 and went to Smederevo. The monastery became deserted again.

Immediately after the war, novices from Sopoćani and father Dositej, former spiritual father of the Žiča monastery (died in 1993), came to the monastery. These novices stayed for a few years, after which they returned to Sopoćani and became nuns Teodora and Serafima there. After them came father Miron, whose death is described by hieromonk Miron Kosać: "By his death, he seemed to confirm the words of that prayer, 'Grant me, Lord, to know my end'. Neighbors found him in bed, wearing clean socks, his face turned towards the east with a candle in his hands and an icon above his head". After that, father Savo Krivokuća (subsequently in Gorioč near Istok) was there briefly with two nuns. From 1960 to 1978, the monastery housed hieromonk Sava Čančarević, its superior, who also signed as the parish priest of Dobrinje. Father Artemije Radosavljević, the defrocked bishop of Raška-Prizren, came in 1978 with father Andrej, who soon left. The arrival of father Artemije marked the beginning of a renewed spiritual blossoming of Crna Reka. Like his glorious predecessors, he worked devotedly on the spiritual level and on the restoration of monastery facilities. The first novice who came to him was the current bishop of Žiča, Justin Stefanović, and then father Nikolaj Nikolić. By the election of father Artemije as the Bishop of Raška-Prizren in 1991, it numbered 15 monks. During those and subsequent years, a larger number of monks were assigned to other monasteries, and some of them became abbots of large monasteries. The Crna Reka monastery became a symbol of the renewal of the entire diocese, and above it, in the hills, the first hermitages sprang up.

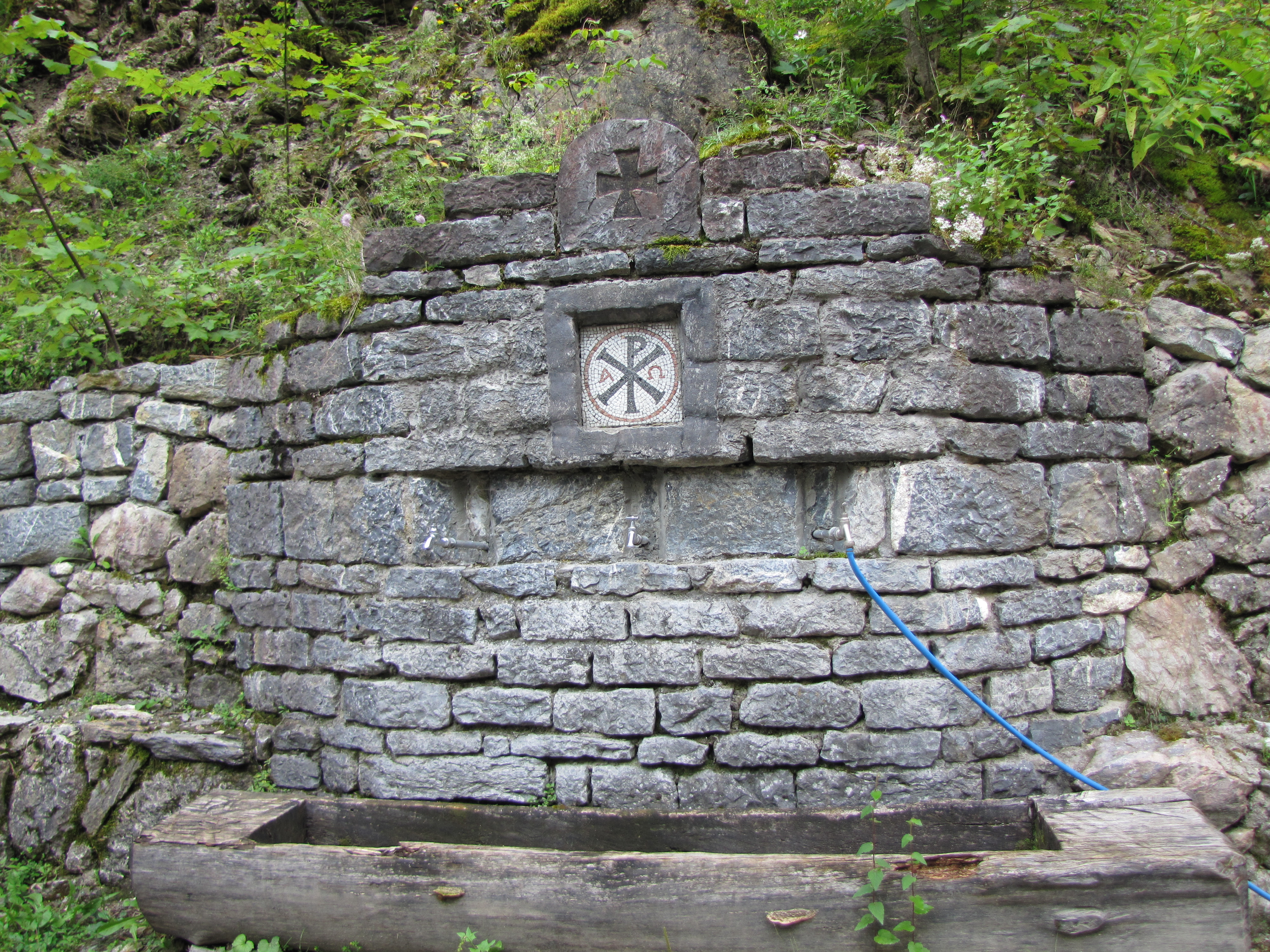
Fountain built during the time of hieromonk kir Sofronije

== Transfer of the relics of Saint Peter of Koriša ==
Venerable Peter of Koriša

The most significant holy relic of the Crna Reka monastery is, certainly, the relics of Saint Peter of Koriša. That is why today it is most often called the Monastery of Saint Peter. In science, the question of when the relics were transferred from Koriša to the Crna Reka monastery remains open. The year 1840 was most frequently cited. However, there are an increasing number of those who believe that it happened much earlier. Petar Kostić thinks that if the relics of Saint Peter could have stayed in Koriša until that year, they would have remained there. "That year (1840) would be exactly known in Koriša, in the monastery of Saint Mark, and in Prizren, or it would have been exactly recorded by Hilferding, who also visited Crna Reka in 1857. It could not have been in 1740 either, but earlier, before Isaija Tucak appointed abbot Serafim as the superior of the monastery of Saint Mark, in 1731". Kostić believes that this could have happened towards the end of the 17th century, or perhaps even earlier. It is certain that the relics were in Crna Reka in 1763. Namely, in a record in the manuscript of the Petrograd library, no. 59 (Sopoćani Memorial), which once belonged to the monastery, it says that in that year the relics of Saint Peter without hands and feet were in Crna Reka. Milan Bojčević believes that the body was transferred exactly in that year. Joining this opinion is archpriest Milan Popović, who in this work also used the memories of the people of Ibar Kolašin. According to the testimony of Trajko Dobrić, the long-time tutor of the monastery, the relics of Saint Peter were brought to Crna Reka intact. This, however, conflicts with the authentic testimony of the writer Teodosije, who noted that some parts of the saint's body were taken away immediately after his passing. When Petar Kostić visited the monastery (perhaps at the end of the 20th century), there were only a torso and legs in the coffin. "The other parts of the body were taken away by individual monks, who were superiors of this monastery during the time of the late metropolitan Melentije". Not even this could be taken as completely accurate if the mentioned statement by Teodosije is taken as authentic testimony. Another record, which supports Kostić's dating, and to which no one paid attention, confirms that the transfer of the relics took place before 1709. The record that testifies that there was already a strong cult of Saint Peter in the monastery reads: "Wrote the servant of God Radojica, and Stanka wrote this menaion to Dragić for the soul, and whoever takes it away from the holy church, let the holy archangel and saint Peter be his opponent". The recorder mentions both the Holy Archangel, to whom the church is dedicated, and Saint Peter, whose body was evidently already in Crna Reka. It is difficult to determine, without more reliable data, how long before this year the saint's relics had been in the monastery. The thesis according to which these relics were transferred here even before 1572 is quite unreliable, which is concluded based on an unreliably read and lost record. It can only be asserted with certainty that the body of Saint Peter was transferred to this monastery before 1709. There are several variants of how the saint's relics were transferred to Crna Reka. Everything confirms that they were transferred by peasants from the Kolašin village of Brnjak. According to the testimony of one of them, they were mowing meadows in the village of Koriša, where they accidentally found the relics. When it got dark, they took them to Kolašin, bringing them to a hill above Zubin Potok, where one of them, Ilija, died from extreme exhaustion. The hill was named Ilinica after him. From there, Saint Peter was taken to Crna Reka. Petar Kostić believes that it happened like this: "When the monks planned to beat up their oppressors, they prepared for it earlier and, knowing what consequences would ensue for the monastery, they hid the relics of Saint Peter in some suitable place until a better opportunity. Having executed what they planned, they fled to such an inaccessible place as Crna Reka, and from there directed the people of Kolašin to transfer the relics of Saint Peter. And then the notion that the people of Kolašin 'accidentally' found them falls away". Vulović presents a somewhat different tradition: "There were some mowers from the Kolašin nahiya in the Prizren nahiya, mowing meadows in the village of Koriša, which is 3–4 hours northwest of Prizren. There Saint Peter appeared to them at night, and they found his reliquary with relics and carried it to their place. Traveling with the relics to their area, they spent the night in the Crna Reka gorge, leaving the reliquary in a cave overnight. When morning came, the saint would not let himself be lifted; and then they left him there and built him a church there". According to the testimony of the mentioned Trajko Dobrić, the people of Brnjak easily brought the saint's body to Krnje, and afterwards they carried it to the church "at Račići", (Note: This small church is in ruins today. Next to it are old tombstones. One of them is made of Radočelo marble, with a human head drawn on it. Such tombstones date from before the 18th century.) a refuge above the monastery, with the help of the monks' prayers. According to another version, the difficulty of carrying the relics arose from the spring "at Brestovi" in the Starčani meadows. And for the well-known Serbian writer, Grigorije Božović, a good connoisseur of the modern history of the monastery, there is no doubt that it was precisely the people of Kolašin who transferred the relics of Saint Peter of Koriša: "One hundred and fifty years ago, Kolašin people from Brnjak were mowing around Prizren for hire, and in the village of Koriša they noticed the deserted church of Saint Peter of Koriša and his relics in the reliquary. Albanians and goats had started to be locked up there. Therefore, these pious people agreed and one night stole the relics and carried them over the mountain to Crna Reka. Since then, the monastery began to be called by the saint's name and to become increasingly famous for this surrounding, both Orthodox and Muslim".

Based on everything, a few more dilemmas arise. If the body of Saint Peter was brought to Crna Reka at the end of the 17th or beginning of the 18th century, which is almost certain, then it could not have been transferred by today's Komatovićs from Brnjak, who settled here much later. There is a possibility that Saint Peter was transferred to Crna Reka twice. Perhaps his body was hidden somewhere in 1763, when the monastery was deserted, and the people of Brnjak really transferred it again in 1840. The solution to this question is yet to be sought. In any case, the cult of Saint Peter is great in Kolašin. A sign of that cult is that the saint is increasingly called Crnorečki, and the monastery of Saint Archangel by his name.

== Library and scriptorium ==
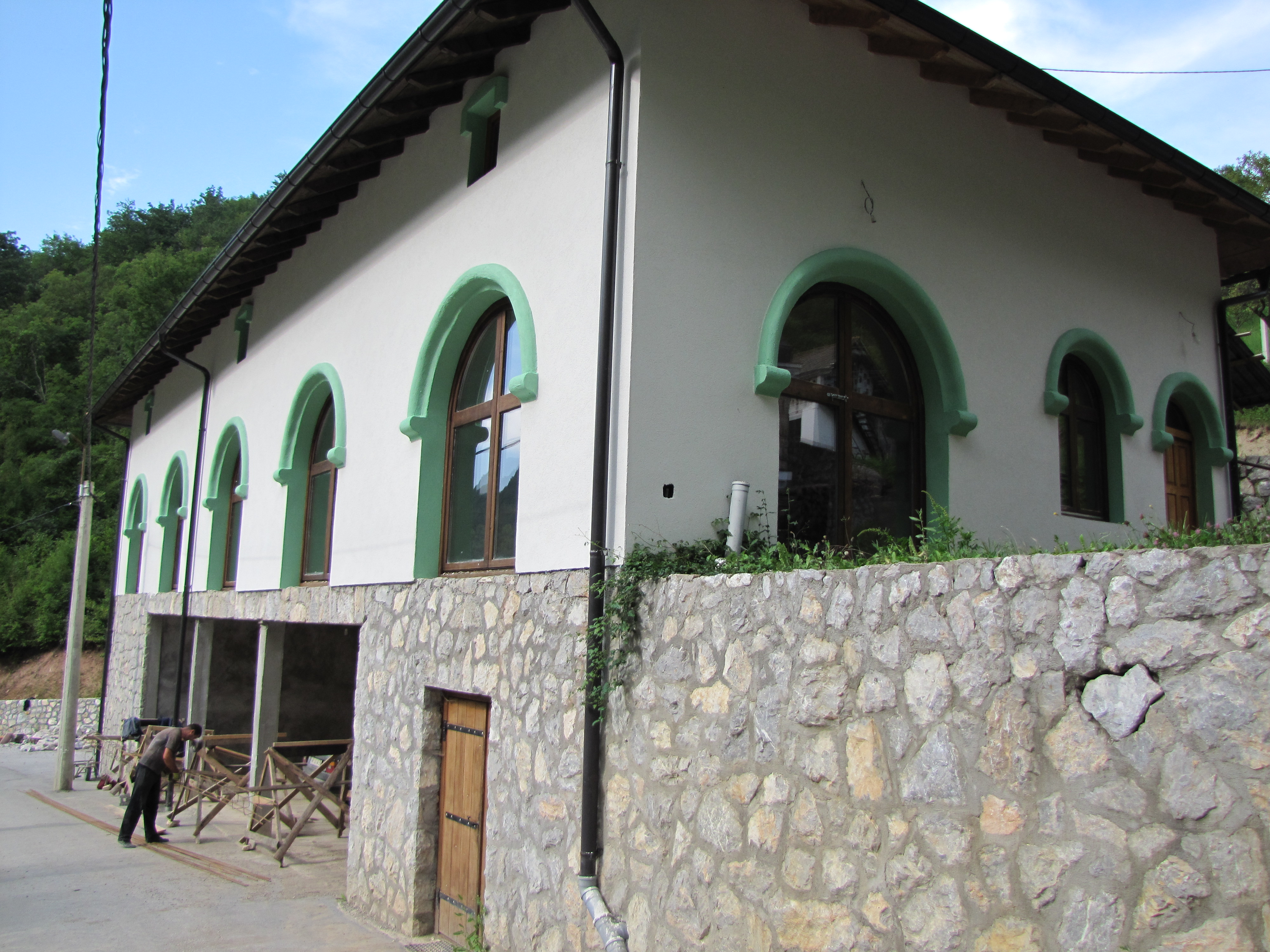
Monastery lodgings

Over the centuries, the monastery possessed a rich library of manuscript and printed liturgical books. When Hilferding was in it, the library had about thirty manuscripts and, most likely, at least as many printed books. According to his testimony, the most numerous were menaions, sluzhebniks (service books), and octoechos. The Memorial of the Sopoćani monastery and two books of Bulgarian redaction were also located there. Until 1856, the book that he "always carried" was kept in the reliquary of Saint Peter of Koriša. Hilferding did not find it. According to testimonies from the end of the 19th century, there were many books written on leather in the church — "over two hundred okas". A library with many old books, written on parchment, was also found by Petar Kostić. Among them was one large gospel. He says "that they are not all preserved in their entirety, because many leaves have been taken away". Records from one of such torn leaves were published by Gligorije Elezović, and one of them belonged to the Ljubostinja monastery. Almost nothing is known about the fate of the others, as well as the fate of most books. Some probably perished during fires and lootings, while others were taken away. Today, the Sopoćani Memorial, which was probably brought to Crna Reka with the relics of Stefan the First-Crowned, is located in the Petrograd library, where Hilferding took it. This manuscript is significant not only for the history of the monastery, but for the entire Ibar Kolašin. In Hilferding's collection, there is also a Crna Reka miscellany, which contains 7 leaves from the Dečani Paraenesis of Saint Ephrem the Syrian, no. 77. One of the Crna Reka manuscripts was located in Dečani, as well as Božidar's menaion. A miscellany (panegyric) of sermons for holidays from September to November was in the church in Duboki Potok. This miscellany is from the second half of the 16th century, had 433 leaves, and contained the Lives of venerable Petka, John of Rila, Ilarion of Meglen, a Sermon by Bishop Clement of Ohrid on the archangels Michael and Gabriel, and a Sermon by Theophylact of Bulgaria on the Presentation of the Mother of God. It was in Crna Reka during the time of abbot Maksim Dobrojević.

Monks and priests cared for the Crna Reka library for centuries. Priest Stojan Dobrinjac (probably from the surrounding village of Dobrinje) bought an Apostolos from the Novi Pazar Turks for ten groschen and donated it to the monastery. One octoechos was also his. At the end of the 18th century, one gospel was bound by priest Aleksije, and hieromonk Nikodim donated a book of hagiographies to the monastery. For liturgical needs, Russian printed menaions, prologues, and psalters were also acquired. The hagiography of Živan Crnogorac, the famous Karlovci presbyter, writer, and bookbinder, was once in Crna Reka, and is now kept in Studenica. Books from other monasteries and churches also arrived in this monastery: Sopoćani, Studenica, Ravanica, Karlovac, Knjaževac, etc. The famous abbot Ananije Milovanović in the great restoration of the monastery in 1874 did not forget to make a "basket" (a kind of shelf made of woven wicker) for keeping books. In difficult times, the Crna Reka books suffered a lot, but they were, as much as possible, carefully guarded. Books were not only kept and acquired, but also copied in the monastery itself. Crna Reka was a center of copying activity at the beginning of the 18th century, during the time of the enterprising abbot Maksim Dobrojević. Among others, a monk from Dobrilovina stayed and copied a book here at that time, which means that the monastery was a broader center of copying work.

== Center of education and literacy ==
Priest Jerotije Stanić, the superior and benefactor of the Crna Reka monastery, born in nearby Oklace, received permission from the Turkish authorities in 1891 to open a school in Crna Reka as well. According to some data, that school began operating in 1898. Its first manager was priest Pavle Stanić, Jerotije's son. The school was a boarding type, and children studied and lived in the lodging built exactly by Jerotije in 1898. The teacher in the Crna Reka school was Milan Kragović from Kobilja Glava. Besides operating as a school, it had an expanded curriculum featuring agricultural lessons, similar to the program of the school in Mileševa for a time. Since the monastery had an estate, the aim was to develop backward agriculture. The Government of Serbia also sent textbooks of the lower agricultural school to Crna Reka. The school ceased operating in 1905. There are testimonies that in Crna Reka many people became literate even before the official opening of this school. Monks and priests worked devotedly on this task, under the constant surveillance of Turkish oppressors. Pavlimir Gligović calls the Crna Reka monastery "the holy seat of our literacy, a national focal point in the most fateful hours of the 19th century". The monastery gave "the bulk of Serbian teachers in sacred persons, priests, and monks. Those great spirits resolved to renew Dušan's empire looked disdainfully at the furious orgies of the Sultan's gendarmes and went to their deaths with a song about their kin and language".

== Architecture ==
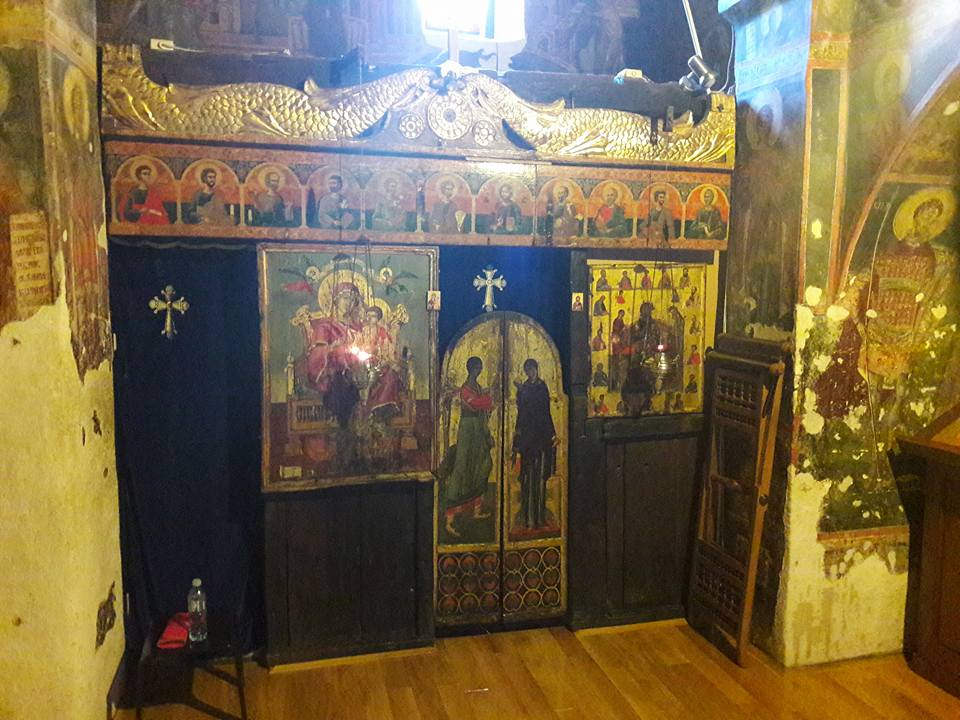
The Church

The architectural complex of the Crna Reka monastery represents a work of exceptional building and creative abilities. A creative approach was manifested in the use of the natural space of the cave and its architectural extension, so that one of the most beautiful Serbian cave churches was created. Leaning against the left bank — the gorge of the sinking river, separated from the right by a wooden bridge, the monastery, with its inaccessibility, resisted enemy attacks for centuries. It is assumed that the bridge was once a drawbridge, so that in case of danger it was almost impossible to approach the monastery. The monastery has four levels, and the bridge leads to the second, up to the entrance door. From there, stairs descend leading to a room on the first level. It once served for accommodating the sick who came for healing to Saint Peter, which is why it was called a hospital or "madhouse". In one corner of that room, there is a niche into which an earthen pot is built, currently broken. It probably once served as a hiding place. On the second level, there are three rooms and a corridor. Two represent cells, one is smaller and has a trapezoidal shape, and the other is larger and has a more regular shape. All three rooms have windows.

On the third level is the church, an antechamber, and one cell, which was most likely the abbot's. The church is "single-nave with a semicircular apse both outside and inside. The nave is vaulted with a semi-barrel vault made of tufa. Between the altar space and the nave, there are protruding pilasters that carry a reinforcing arch. The base is not symmetrical and is quite irregular with a length of 7.00 m and a width of 3.20 m. On the southern wall, two wide arches were constructed that shorten the span of the vault above the nave. The southern wall is extended in the eastern direction for the length of the apse projection." The floor of the church is lower than the level of the narthex, which is adapted to the cave narrowing into a gorge. The fourth level is reached by wooden stairs. The dining room, kitchen, and bakery are located there. This level has an exit to a balcony. Certainly, there are more beautiful and monumental churches in Serbian architecture. The architectonics of Crna Reka, however, possess a richness that gives it an exceptional charm. That is a unique kind of mysticism. The combination of architectural beauty and that mysticism ranks this monastery as one of the most attractive.

== Frescoes ==
The monastery church is located in a cave. It is a single-nave building with a rectangular base and an altar apse. It was painted with frescoes between 1591–1602 by the famous zograf and fresco painter Longin, and it is also the most precious Serbian wall painting of the 16th century. The frescoes of the Crna Reka monastery captivate with rich colors and exceptional artistic value, testifying to the continuity of Serbian wall painting and its quality and richness even during the period of Turkish rule. They were created at the very end of the 16th century, most likely in 1599/1600. This is concluded based on a damaged inscription about the painting of the church (the last letter designating the year is illegible) and a record of the completion of work on the iconostasis, which fortunately is preserved. Radomir Stanić, the author of an extensive study on the frescoes, believes that the last letter could be 'i'. This gives the year zri — 7108, or 1599—1600 from Christ's birth. Considering that the iconostasis, made by the same hand, was painted by March 20, 1601, it is assumed that the frescoes were done before that. They were done by the famous zograf and painter Longin. In Stanić's opinion, the Crna Reka painter was one of the most gifted students who came out of the workshop of Peć masters. Longin's talent is also shown in the painting of other churches. He also had an assistant who worked only on painting the background of figures and scenes and in processing decorative ornamentation.

The donor of the frescoes and benefactor of the Crna Reka painters is the servant of God Nikola, a rich nobleman, painted in almost life size on the western wall of the niche in an unusual donor composition. It is customary for the patron of the church to lead the donor to Christ or the Mother of God, which is not the case here. Nikola points to a segment of the sky where the hand of God is represented, and to a prayerful donor text, which is also atypical. He does not specify his donor role in any closer way, which would be natural. The written prokeimenon indicates the exceptional theological education of either the donor or the painter, which is more likely. The wall painting of the Crna Reka church has narrowed themes due to its small dimensions. That did not prevent the Crna Reka zograf from expressing undeniable talent and exceptional knowledge of the iconographic program and technique. Two cycles prevail in the painting of Crna Reka: Christ's Passion and the Great Feasts. The rest of the temple is occupied by other few scenes and figures of individual saints. The cycle of Christ's Passion includes: the Last Supper, Washing of the Feet, Prayer in Gethsemane, Judas' Betrayal, Bringing before Pilate, Peter's Denial, Mocking of Christ, Carrying the Cross, Entombment, etc. The Great Feasts cycle is represented by: Annunciation, Christmas, Candlemas, Baptism, Lazarus' Resurrection, Transfiguration, Ascension, Christ's Crucifixion and Dormition of the Mother of God (the largest composition in the temple, located on the western wall of the nave). Archangel Michael is painted in two places: on the southern side of the southern pilaster and above the inscription about the painting of the temple. The scene of the Miracle in Chonae (in the vault of the niche), as a miracle performed by Archangel Michael, which is not often painted, stands out in value. The Crna Reka painter painted several types of Jesus Christ, and scenes also stand out: Adoration of the Lamb, Communion of the Apostles, Vision of Saint Peter of Alexandria and others. In several places, the Mother of God, John the Baptist, Saint Stephen, Archangel Gabriel, and then holy warriors were painted. Serbian saints, Saint Sava and Saint Simeon, are painted on the southern wall of the niche's vault. Some, most likely, were also painted above the inscription about the painting of the temple (besides the two mentioned, also Saint Stefan of Dečani).

== Monastery slavas (Patron saint days) ==
The temple slava of the Crna Reka monastery is the Synaxis of the Holy Archistrategos Michael (November 8 / November 21). The temple slava is solemnly celebrated with the presence of the competent Hierarch Mr. Artemije (abbot of Crna Reka in the period 1978−1991) and a considerable number of Crna Reka pilgrims. On the eve of the holiday, at the vigil, the Holy Archangel gives his community new, mostly young, monks. It is not rare that at the temple slava there are up to three monastic tonsures. At the liturgy that day, the Crna Reka community also receives new hierodeacons and hieromonks.

The most visited slava of the monastery is the Holy Apostles Peter and Paul (Petrovdan) (July 12 / June 29). As older residents testify, thousands of people used to come to Crna Reka for Petrovdan in the past. Each family had its "sofra" in an exactly designated spot, and there every year on Petrovdan they would prepare a small snack for family members and for those who would visit them in that place. It was an opportunity for people to bow, pray, or give thanks to Saint Peter of Koriša, whose name became the "oath and curse" of this region. Even today, on Petrovdan, up to two thousand people gather in Crna Reka. Just as on the temple slava, monastic tonsures and ordinations take place on Petrovdan.

In the monastery, the day of the passing of Peter of Koriša, also called small Petrovdan (June 18 / June 5), and the feast day of the chapel dedicated to Saint Great Martyr King Jovan Vladimir (May 4 / May 22) are observed with visitors present. On those days, the reliquary containing the relics is opened to believers.

== Gallery ==
Crna Reka Monastery

Entrance to the monastery courtyard

Monastery bell

Bridge leading to the entrance of the monastery

Icons

Monastery terrace

Monastery entrance

Corridor

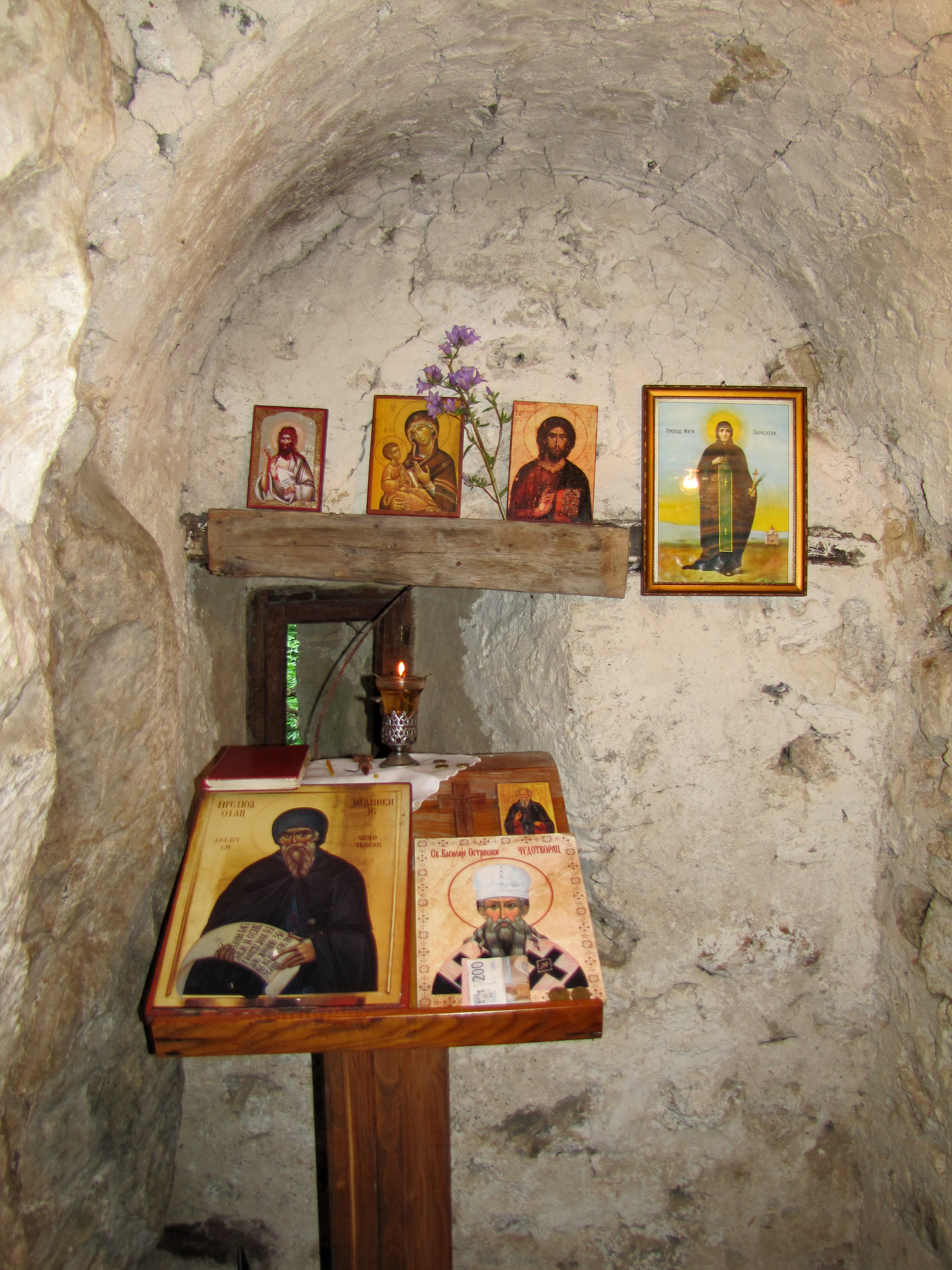
Prayer room

Monastery

Monastery

Bridge

Bridge

Terrace

Terrace

Belltower

Terraces

Monastery

== See also ==
- List of Serbian Orthodox monasteries

== Sources ==
- Bojčević, Milan (1940). Manastir Crna reka.
- Bojović, Dragiša (2003). Sveti Jefrem Sirin u srpskoj književnosti. p. 110.
- Božović, Grigorije (1996). Manastir Crna reka.
- Ćorović, Vladimir (1934). Manastir Dobrilovina, Godišnjica NČ, XVIII. p. 171.
- Ćorović-Ljubinković, Mirjana (1949). Ikona iz XIV veka „Čudo u Honi”. Belgrade: Muzeji. p. 110.
- Elezović, Gliša (1936). Zapisi i natpisi, Zbornik za istoriju Južne Srbije i susednih oblasti, I. p. 270.
- Gligović, Pavlimir (1939). Po našim slavnim starinama. p. 24.
- Hilferding, Alexander (1972). Putovanje po Bosni, Hercegovini i Staroj Srbiji. p. 150.
- Jagić, Vatroslav (1891). Kritischer Anzeiger – Stari srpski hrisovulji, akti. Vol. XIII. Berlin: Archiv für slavische Philologie. p. 128.
- Kosać, Jeromonah Miron (1993). Monaški život u manastiru Crna reka. p. 106.
- Kostić, Petar (1911). Manastir sv. Marka s dodacima o manastiru Crnoj reci i o Petru Koriškom. p. 230.
- Ljubinković, Radivoje (1958). Manastir Crna reka.
- Mićović, Drago (1986). Rodoslov – da se ne zaboravi. p. 204.
- Mošin, Vladimir (1968–1971). Rukopisi iz crkve u Dubokom Potoku i iz crkve sv. Nikole u Đurakovcu, Starine Kosova i Metohije, IV–V.
- Novaković, Stojan (1911). Nemanjićske prestonice Ras-Pauni-Nerodimlja. Vol. LXXXVIII. Belgrade: Glas SKA. p. 9.
- Petković, Vladimir (1923). Starine, zapisi, natpisi, listine. p. 14.
- Petrović, Radomir (1998). Istraživanja i otkrića u Manastiru Crna reka. pp. 43–87.
- Petrović, Radomir (2005). Pomen ktitora iz Ibarskog Kolašina i zapisi iz XVII veka u Crkvi sv. Jovana u selu Crkolezu. p. 158.
- Popović, Milan (1973). Manastir Crna reka.
- Šakota, Mirjana (1988). Studenička riznica. p. 66.
- Šalipurović, Vukoman (1970). Srpske škole i prosveta u zapadnim krajevima Stare Srbije, u XIV veku. p. 25.
- Šalipurović, Vukoman (1972). Kulturno-prosvetne i političke organizacije u Polimlju i Raškoj 1903–1912. Nova Varoš: Opštinska zajednica obrazovanja.
- Stanić, Radomir (1975). Zidno slikarstvo crkve manastira Crne reke. Kraljevo: Raška baština. p. 97.
- Stojanović, Ljubomir (1890). Stari srpski hrisovulji, akti, biografije, letopisi, pomenici, zapisi i dr., Spomenik SKA, III. p. 177.
- Stojanović, Ljubomir (1923). Stari srpski zapisi i natpisi. Vol. VI. p. 56.
- Vulović, Mila (1894). Manastir Crna reka.
- Vulović, Mila (1965). Srednjovekovni duborez u istočnim oblastima Jugoslavije. p. 99.
- Vulović, Mila (1972). Manastir sv. Arhanđela u Crnoj reci. Novi Sad: Zbornik za likovne umetnosti. p. 251.
- Zapisi i natpisi (n.d.). Zapisi i natpisi manastira Crna Reka.
