= Monastery of Saint Mark of Koriša =

Serbian Orthodox monastery in Korishë, Kosovo

Saint Mark Koriški Monastery

Religion
- Affiliation: Serbian Orthodox
- District: Prizren
- Ecclesiastical or organizational status: Damaged in summer 1999
- Leadership: Serbian Orthodox Church

Location
- Location: Kosovo
- Interactive map of Saint Mark Koriški Monastery
- Coordinates: 42.25455°N 20.79822°E

Architecture
- Completed: around 1467
- Materials: Stone
- Cultural Heritage of Serbia
- Official name: Manastir sa Crkvom Sv. Marka
- Type: Monument of Culture
- Designated: 9 August 1965

The Monastery of Saint Mark of Koriša (Serbian: Манастир Свети Марко Коришки, romanized: Manastir Sveti Marko Koriški; Albanian: Manastiri i Markut të Shenjtë, Korishë) was a Serbian Orthodox monastery built in 1467, located in Korishë, Prizren, Kosovo. The entire complex was declared a Protected Monument of Culture in 1959, and it is de jure protected by Serbia. It was a single-nave church, built on a rectangular foundation. It was severely damaged after the end of the Kosovo War in 1999.

== History ==
The ruins of the monastery of Saint Mark of Koriša stands on a rocky outpost above the Koriša river near the village of Korishë, near Prizren. According to preserved documents, the monastery was built by Jovan and Branko Vlahić in 1467, and it was a metochion (granted church land) to the Hermitage of St. Peter of Koriša, built in the 13th century. The monastery is mentioned in the Ottoman defter of 1520. It was abandoned in the 16th century, and reactivated in the 17th century. In 1765, monk Neofit brought "many books from Visoki Dečani".

In 1779, Partenije Popović was a monk at the monastery, whither he brought several important medieval books and manuscripts. In 1859, a schoolteacher in Prizren, Nikola Musulin, found Dušan's Code, the constitution of the Serbian Empire. The following year the charter of the Monastery of the Holy Archangels also issued by Stefan Dušan was found in St. Nicholas Church of Koriša. On the western side, above the rock, a belfry with two bells was added in 1861 as a foundation of Sima Andrejević.

After that, monastery was almost abandoned up until 1995, when monastery life restarted. In 1999, the monastery was vandalized and set on fire, when the preserved fragment of the original fresco was destroyed. The monastery had a valuable library.

== Gallery ==
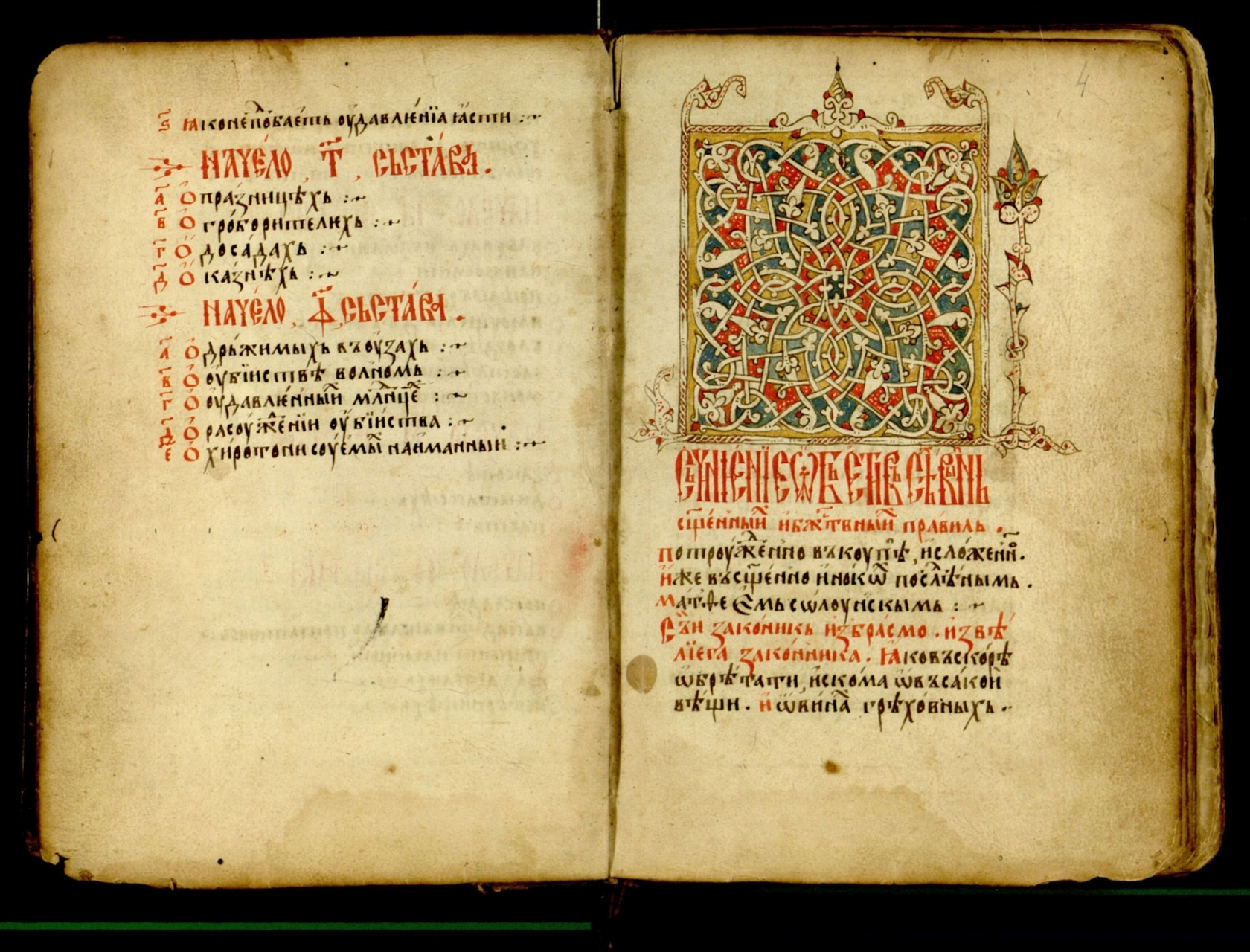
One of the oldest manuscripts of Dušan's Code, "Prizren Manuscript" was kept in Saint Mark Koriški Monastery

== See also ==
- List of Serbian Orthodox monasteries

== Sources ==
- "Manastir sa Crkvom Sv. Marka". Serbian Academy of Sciences and Arts. 2006.
- Radovanović, Milovan (2008). "Kosovo i Metohija: antropogeografske, istorijskogeografske, demografske i geopolitičke osnove". Službeni glasnik.
