= Sava Janjić =

Serbian Orthodox archimandrite

- Сава Јањић
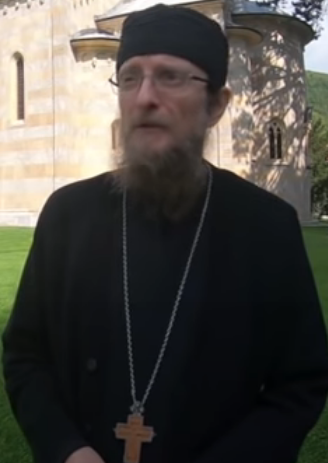
- Born: 6 December 1965 (age 60); Dubrovnik, SR Croatia, SFR Yugoslavia
- Education: University of Belgrade
- Occupation: Serbian Orthodox priest
- Known for: being the Hegumen of the Visoki Dečani monastery

Sava Janjić (Serbian Cyrillic: Сава Јањић; born 6 December 1965), born as Dragutin Janjić (Драгутин Јањић) is a Serbian Orthodox archimandrite and a hegumen of the Visoki Dečani monastery.

== Biography ==
He was born in 1965 in Dubrovnik. He has a Serb father and Croat mother. He grew up with his family in Trebinje, where he spent his youth and schooling and finished middle and high school. He studied English language and Literature at the University of Belgrade.

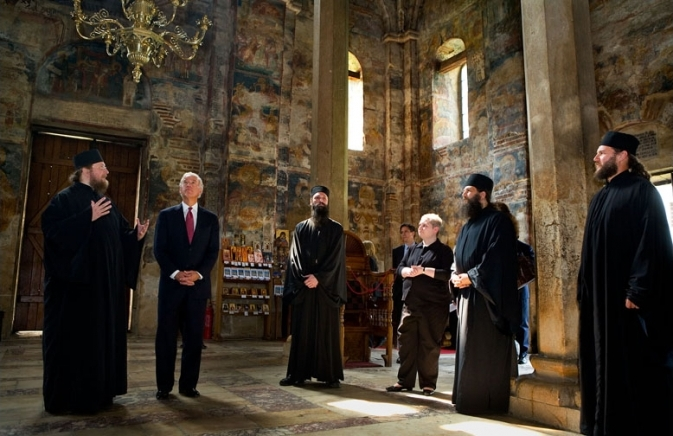
Janjić (first from the left) and Joe Biden during the tour of the Visoki Dečani monastery.

He came to the Crna Reka monastery in 1989. He spent three years there and received monastic tonsure in 1991. Together with the rest of the brotherhood, he moved to the Visoki Dečani monastery with the desire to restore the spiritual reputation of this endowment of King Stefan Dečanski. He has been dealing with information technologies since 1994. He managed to bring the Church closer to the new technologies. Thanks to him, during the entire NATO bombing of Yugoslavia and the Kosovo War, the world had information that could not be found anywhere else.

He was ordained to the rank of hierodeacon on June 4, 1992, and on January 8, 1993, to the rank of hieromonk.

After that, he was the secretary of the late Bishop of Raška and Prizren, Artemije (Radosavljević). Together with him and Momčilo Trajković, he travelled the world during 1998 and 1999, trying to explain the truth about the situation in Kosovo and Metohija to world statesmen. In 2011, at the suggestion of the Bishop of Raška and Prizren, Teodosije (Šibalić), he was elected hegumen - abbot of the monastery Visoki Dečani.

Father Sava Janjić publicly advocated peace and reconciliation as the only way to resolve problems in Kosovo and opposed equally to any form of aggressive nationalism. He continues to pursue peace and reconciliation. Fr. Sava reestablished his presence in the peace and reconciliation process and community by utilizing technology, engaging in frequent Facebook updates and Tweets, and commenting on cultural and religious issues in Kosovo and worldwide.

Father Sava Janjić has continuously opposed ethnic discrimination and advocated a peaceful life among all Kosovo communities. He publicly opposed the idea of a land swap in Kosovo as a possible solution to the crisis. He has raised his voice many times also after the Kosovo war advocating protection of human and religious rights of Kosovo Serbs as well as the protection of Serbian Orthodox heritage in Kosovo.

During the Kosovo war in 1999, Father Sava, the then Dečani hegumen and now Bishop Teodosije and Dečani monks organized humanitarian aid for all vulnerable communities. The Monastery also gave refuge to approximately 200 Kosovo Albanians from the Dečani area to save their lives from paramilitaries. In his many contacts with international politicians and leaders Father Sava Janjić has been particularly highlighting the need of long-term protection of Kosovo Serbs as well as strong mechanisms of protection of Serbian Orthodox holy sites in Kosovo primarily due to post-1999 Destruction of Serbian heritage in Kosovo.

== See also ==
- Dečani Monastery Official Twitter Account managed by Sava Janjić
- Sava Janjić's Official Facebook Account
- Dečani Monastery Official Web Site
