= Istočni Mojstir =

- Village (Selo)
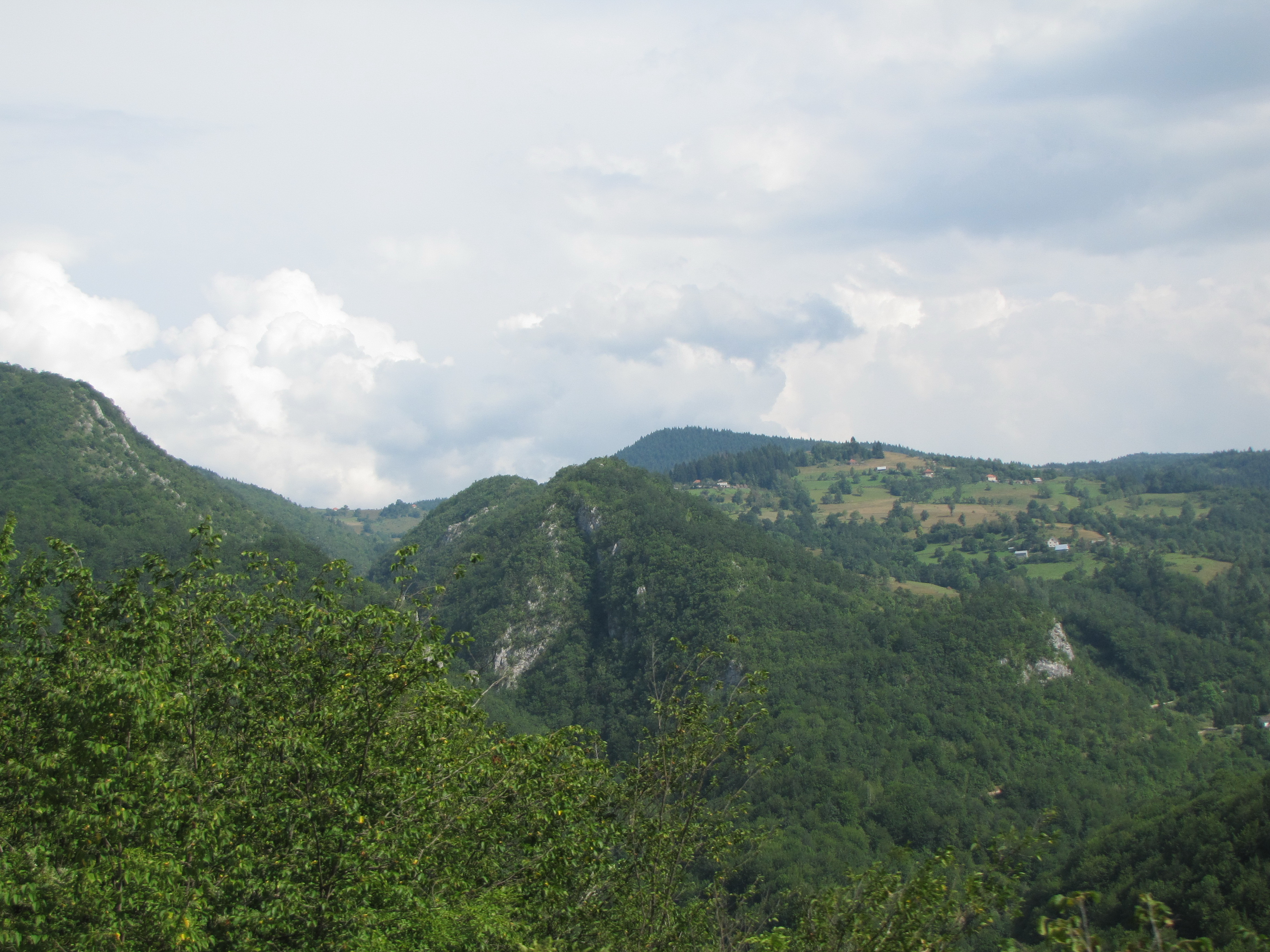

- Location within Serbia
- Coordinates: 42°54′N 20°26′E
- Country: Serbia
- District: Raška District
- Municipality: Tutin

Population (2002)
  - Total: 138
- Time zone: UTC+1 (CET)
  - Summer (DST): UTC+2 (CEST)

Istočni Mojstir is a village in the municipality of Tutin, Serbia. According to the 2002 census, the village has a population of 138 people.

East Mojstir is one of the ethnic Serb villages of Tutin. It is close to the Crna Reka Monastery.
