= Hariton Lukić =

Serbian Orthodox monk

Hariton of Kosovo

Holy martyr
- Born: Radoslav Lukić; 21 November 1960; Seoce, Kuršumlija, Federal People's Republic of Yugoslavia
- Died: 15 June 1999 (aged 38); Prizren, Federal Republic of Yugoslavia
- Venerated in: Eparchy of Raška and Prizren in exile
- Canonized: 16 May 2016, Ljuljaci by the Eparchy of Raška and Prizren in exile
- Feast: 11 October (O.S. 28 September)

Hariton Lukić (born Radoslav Lukić; 21 November 1960 — 15 June 1999) was a Serbian Orthodox monk who was kidnapped, murdered and beheaded by suspected Albanian Kosovo Liberation Army (KLA) members shortly after the end of the Kosovo War.

== Biography ==
He was born on 21 November 1960, in a village near Kuršumlija in Serbia, into a working-peasant family and baptized as Radoslav. He took his monastic vows in the Crna Reka Monastery, near Ribarić, in 1995. Two years later, he was transferred by the Bishop of Raska-Prizren Artemije to the Monastery of the Holy Archangels near Prizren in Kosovo and in 1998 he was ordained as a monk.

On 15 June 1999, Hariton's car was stopped at a checkpoint and he was abducted by several uniformed men. A German news reporter witnessed and photographed the abduction and informed Bishop Artemije but did not contact the Eparchy of Raška-Prizren again. In September 2000, Organization for Security and Co-operation in Europe (OSCE) representatives recovered the remains of Father Hariton in the Tusus neighborhood of Prizren. He had been stabbed to death and decapitated. Photographs of his remains, identification, along with his robe and rosary were handed to the Gračanica monastery by OSCE representatives.

His relics were initially transferred to the Gračanica monastery. A funeral service was held on 11 November 2000 and his remains were thereby transferred to the Crna Reka Monastery.

He was canonized by the unrecognized uncanonical Church, Eparchy of Raška and Prizren in exile on 16 May 2016 in the monastery of Saint John the Baptist in the village Ljuljaci although he is venerated by the laity of the canonical Serbian Orthodox Church. The date of his commemoration was set for September 28 (according to the old calendar), i.e. October 11 (according to the new calendar).
