= Peter of Koriša =

First hermit saint of Medieval Serbia

Saint Peter of Koriša
- Honored in: Eastern Orthodox Church

Petar Koriški (in Serbian: Петар Коришки; lived in the 13th century) was the first hermit saint of Medieval Kingdom of Serbia, who lived in a cave on Rusenica mountain, part of the Šar Mountains range, where he gained fame as an ascetic wonderworker among his people.

== Biography ==
He was born in Ujmir, a village south-west of Peja and died in the town of Korishë, which is located in Prizren, Kosovo. Petar and his sister, after the death of their parents, joined a monastic community and later both became hermits. It is said that Petar healed those who sought his help and his fame spread with the ensuing years, transforming into the "Cult of Petar of Koriša."

His rock-cut monastery is also known as the Hermitage of St. Peter of Koriša.

== Veneration ==
The Serbian Orthodox Church venerates him on 5 June (Julian Calendar).

Petar Koriški was the only saint that was neither a state ruler nor head of the Church, though an exception was made in his case by the Serbian Orthodox Church.

In the next century, Teodosije the Hilandarian popularized Petar in his 1310 realistic work titled "The Life of Petar of Koriša." Teodosije's narrative demonstrated the characteristics of a novel.

== See also ==
- List of Serbian saints
