= Ribariće =

Ribariće Рибариће
- Village (Selo)
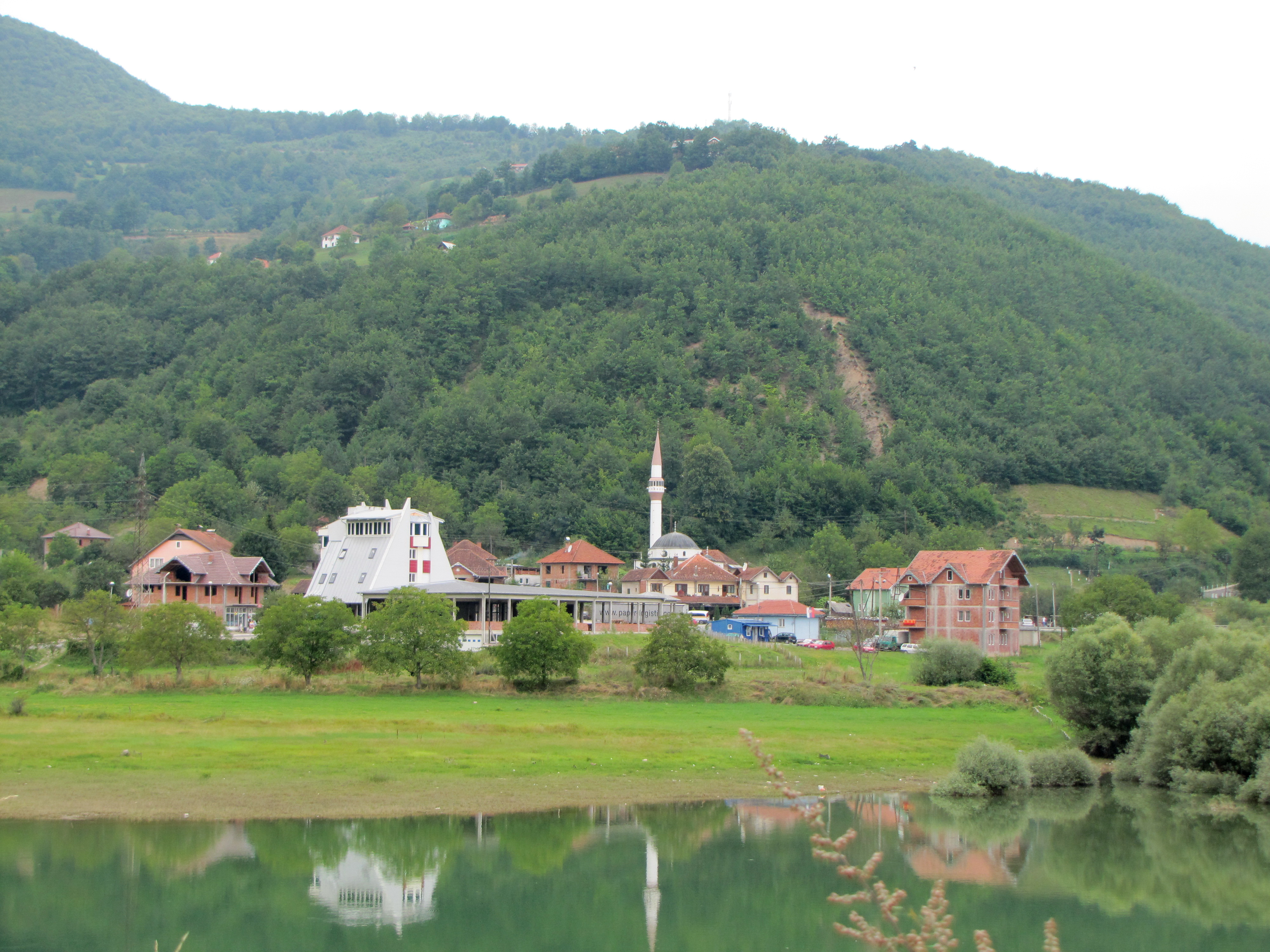

- Location within Serbia
- Coordinates: 42°58′20″N 20°27′23″E
- Country: Serbia
- District: Raška District
- Municipality: Tutin

Area
  - Total: 14.70 km^{2} (5.68 sq mi)
- Elevation: 726 m (2,382 ft)

Population (2011)
  - Total: 947
  - Density: 64.4/km^{2} (167/sq mi)
- Time zone: UTC+1 (CET)
  - Summer (DST): UTC+2 (CEST)

Ribariće (Serbian Cyrillic: Рибариће; Albanian: Ribariqi) is a village in the municipality of Tutin, Serbia. According to the 2011 census, the village has a population of 947 inhabitants. The Crna Reka Monastery is located near the village.

== Notable people ==
- Mirza Golubica, footballer
