= Gruža Lake =

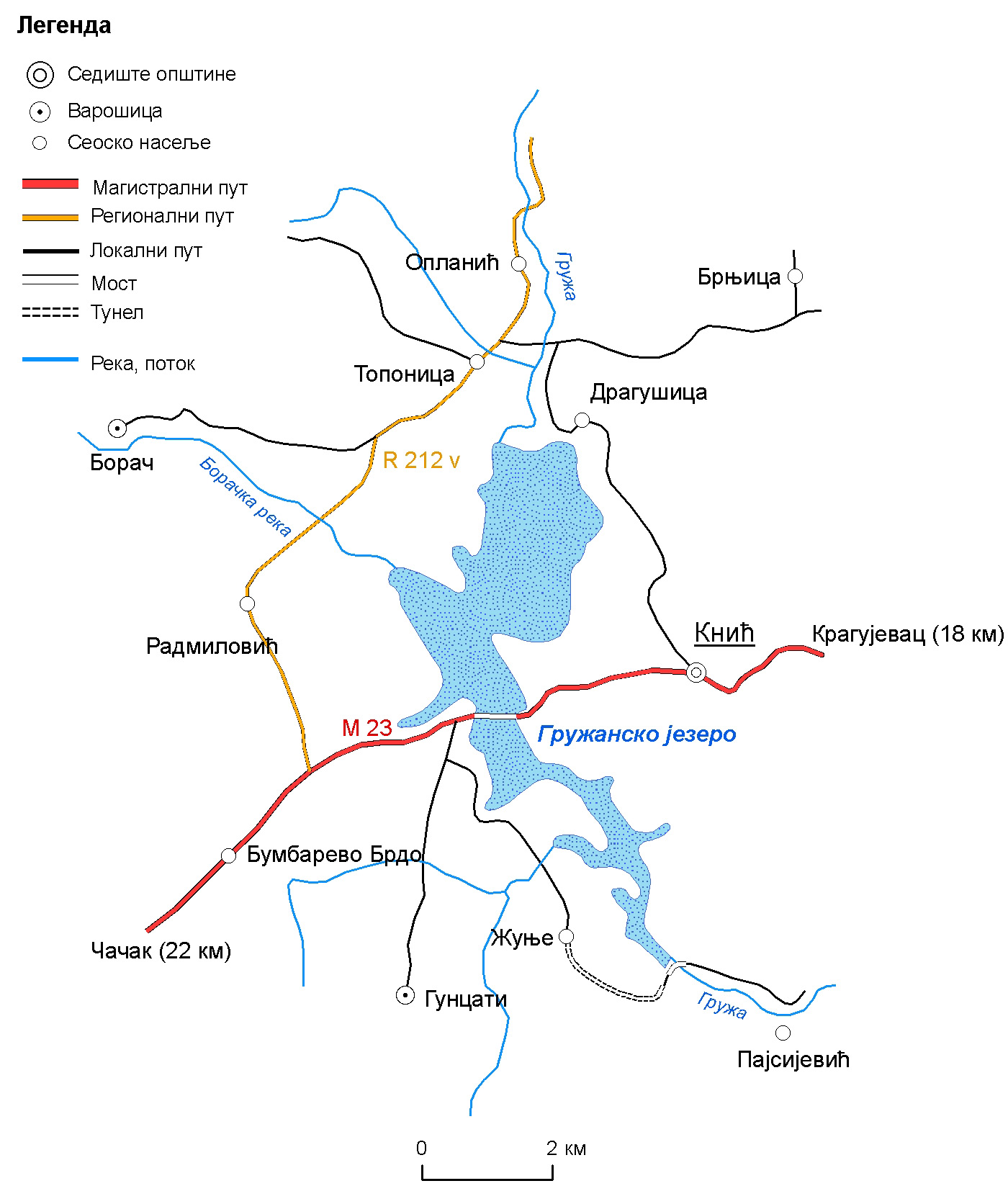

- Location within Serbia
- Location: Central Serbia
- Coordinates: 43.9261°N 20.6783°E
- Lake type: Reservoir
- Primary inflows: Gruža river, Boračka river
- Primary outflows: Gruža
- Catchment area: West Morava
- Basin countries: Serbia
- Max. length: 10 km (6.2 mi)
- Max. width: 2.8 km (1.7 mi)
- Surface area: 9.19 km^{2} (3.55 sq mi)
- Average depth: 6.5 m (21 ft)
- Max. depth: 35 m (115 ft)
- Water volume: 64,500,000 m^{3} (2.28×10^{9} cu ft)
- Shore length^{1}: 42 km (26 mi)
- Surface elevation: 273 m (896 ft)
- Settlements: Gruža, Knić, Kragujevac
- ^{1} Shore length is not a well-defined measure.

Gruža Lake (Serbian: Гружанско језеро, Gružansko jezero), is an artificial lake located to the southwest of Knić, Serbia. The lake was created in 1983 as a water reservoir for the city of Kragujevac and the surrounding settlements. The lake covers an area of approximately 9.19 km2, making it the largest body of water in Central Serbia.

== History ==
The special spatial plan for the future lake and the surrounding area was drafted in 1976. It took almost a decade of scientific and expertly deliberations on the viability of a reservoir on the bad configuration terrain, but the politicians decided to go with it. After various technical setbacks, the water treatment facility in the village of Pajsijević became operational in 1984. The lake is used for providing tap water to 250,000 inhabitants in Kragujevac and surrounding territories.

Technical problems with the reservoir persisted. Shallow average depth of the lake and relatively large flooding area are ideal for the overgrowth of plants, which rot and complicate the treatment processes. The process is further endangered by the boom of illegal construction on the banks of the lake, despite strict ban. Some 200 illegal permanent structures were built along the lake, polluting it. The water is further polluted by pesticides, as arable lots of local farmers reach the lake's bank, even though the law forbids use of chemicals on the shoreline of the lake since the water is used for drinking.

New spatial plan was proposed in 2011, but was never adopted. It included elevation of the water level and enlargement of the lake, but the residents of the bank villages protested, fearing they will end up being flooded. In March 2022, the government decided to make a new spatial plan for the area, which includes 44 villages with 30,000 denizens, on the territory of the cities of Kragujevac and Čačak, and municipalities of Knić and Gornji Milanovac. The plan includes construction of the Gruža Highway next to the lake.

== Biodiversity ==
Thanks to its proximity to Knić and Kragujevac, as well as its spaciousness, fishing is very popular and fishing competitions are frequent. Carp, pike, catfish, Prussian carp, bleak, perch, trout, bream, zander, etc. are present in the lake.

On 21 June 2018, a gigantic wels catfish was caught in the shallow section of the lake known as the "Turkish wells". It was 2.4 m (7 ft 10 in) long and weighed 117 kg (258 lb). It took 4 fishermen and 3 hours to get it out of the water.

The lake plays a very important role during the migration of foreign and native bird populations. The lake is also a wintering ground for some species of ducks and geese, because it is located on the presumed Moravian-Vardar migration route. 78 species of birds were recorded, of which 25 were found to nest in the lake area. The largest number of species was recorded in the zone of strong anthropogenic influence.
