= Hermitage of St. Peter of Koriša =

Serbian Orthodox monastery in Korishë, Kosovo

Hermitage of St. Peter Koriški
- Испосница Светог Петра Коришког; Vetmia e Shën Petrit Korishës
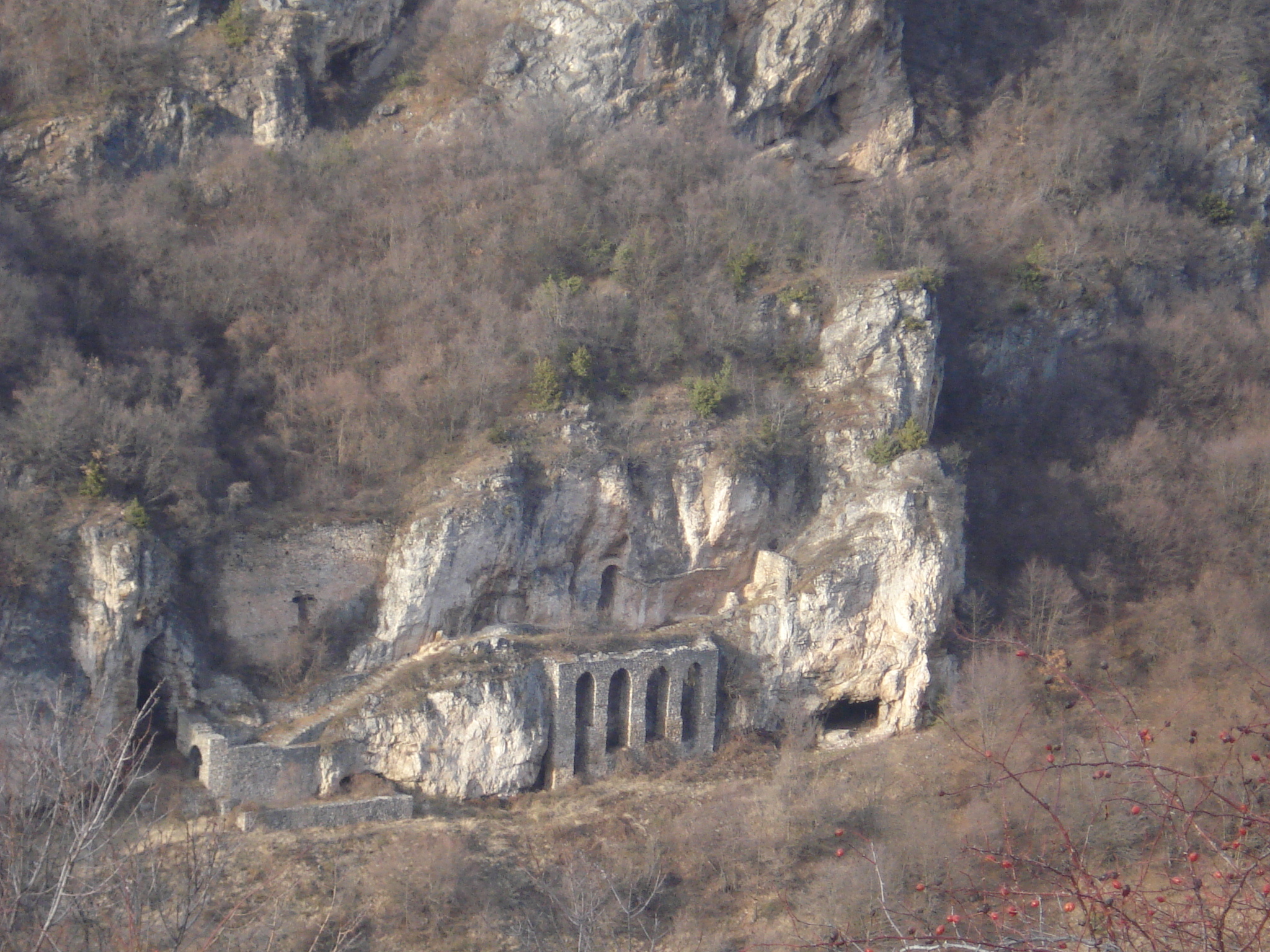
- Hermitage of St. Peter Koriški overview

Religion
- Affiliation: Serbian Orthodoxy
- District: Prizren
- Ecclesiastical or organizational status: Ruins, abandoned in 1453
- Leadership: Serbian Orthodox Church

Location
- Location: Kosovo
- Interactive map of Hermitage of St. Peter Koriški
- Coordinates: 42.2504057°N 20.8041107°E

Architecture
- Type: Hermitage
- Completed: c. 1200
- Materials: stone
- Cultural Heritage of Serbia
- Official name: Monastery and Hermitage of Saint Peter Koriški
- Type: Cultural Monument of Exceptional Importance
- Designated: 1950
- Reference no.: СК 1400

The Hermitage and Monastery of Saint Peter Koriški (Serbian: Испосница и манастир Светог Петра Коришког, romanized: Isposnica i manastir Svetog Petra Koriškog; Albanian: Vetmia e Shën Petrit Korishës) is a ruin of the hermitage and monastery located in the village of Korishë, Prizren municipality, Kosovo. The monastery and hermitage are at the same location.

== History ==
The Monastery is an ancient cave dwelling, home to Peter of Koriša until his death. On 19 May 1343, the monastery was donated to King Stefan Dušan. It later became an important monastery, but was abandoned in 1453 after the Turkish invasion. After the monastery was disbanded, the remains of St. Peter Koriški were moved to the monastery at Crna Reka in 1572.

The hermitage was a declared cultural monument on 16 December 1950, and registered as a Protected Monument of Culture in 1990 under the protection of the Republic of Serbia.

The site contains frescoes dating from 1220 and 1350, which are a depiction of Serbian Orthodox art. The hermitage also incorporates cells for the monks, and a communal dining space.

In February 2021, a group of four Kosovo Albanians was arrested by local police authorities for stealing archeological remains.

In February 2025, the Serbian Orthodox Church announced that illegal construction works had taken place at the site of the hermitage, causing significant damage to the shrine. The destruction of Serbian heritage in Kosovo continues to be an issue, with many Orthodox sites aside from this one destroyed.

== Gallery ==
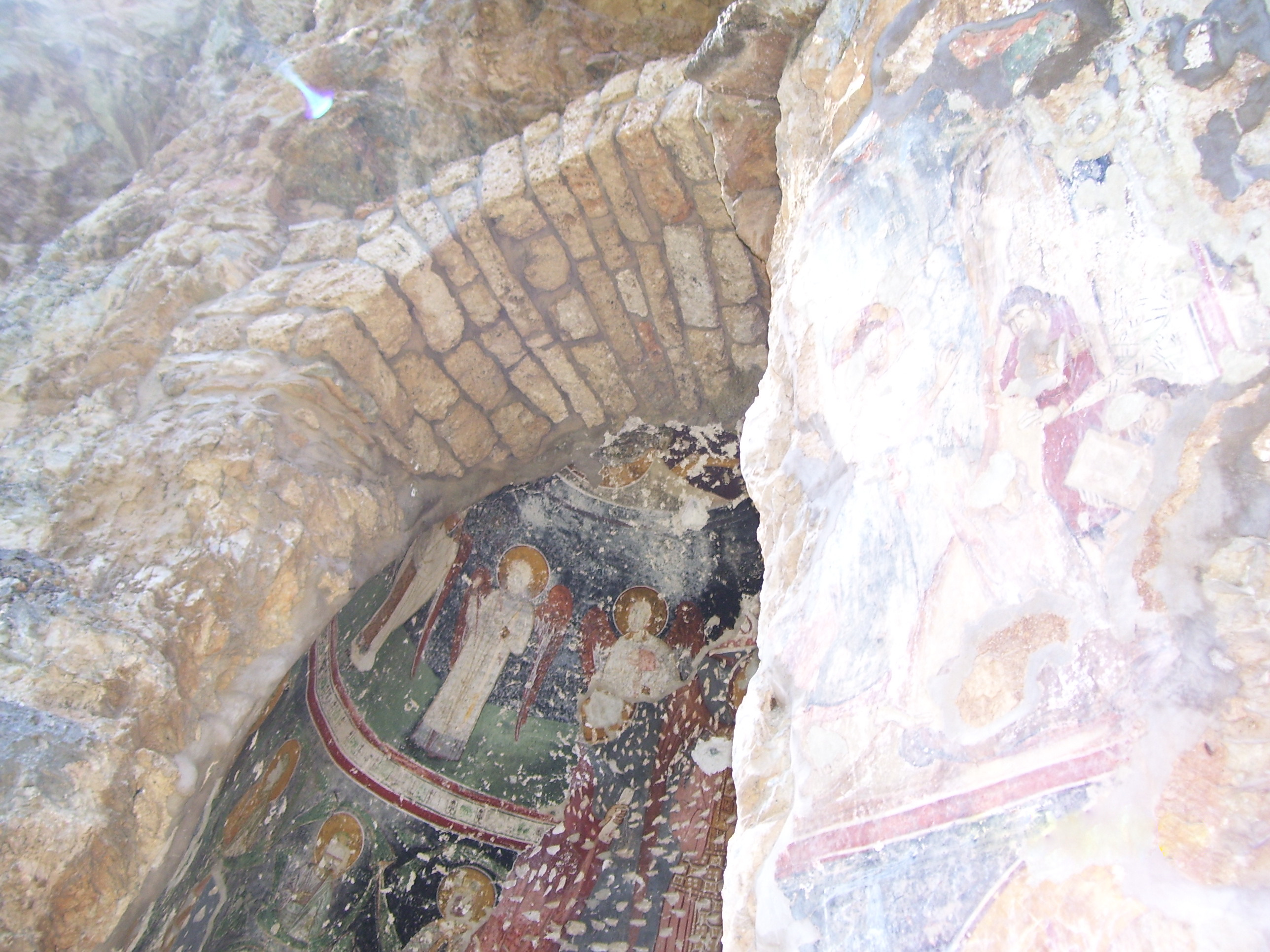
Remains of 15th-century frescoes

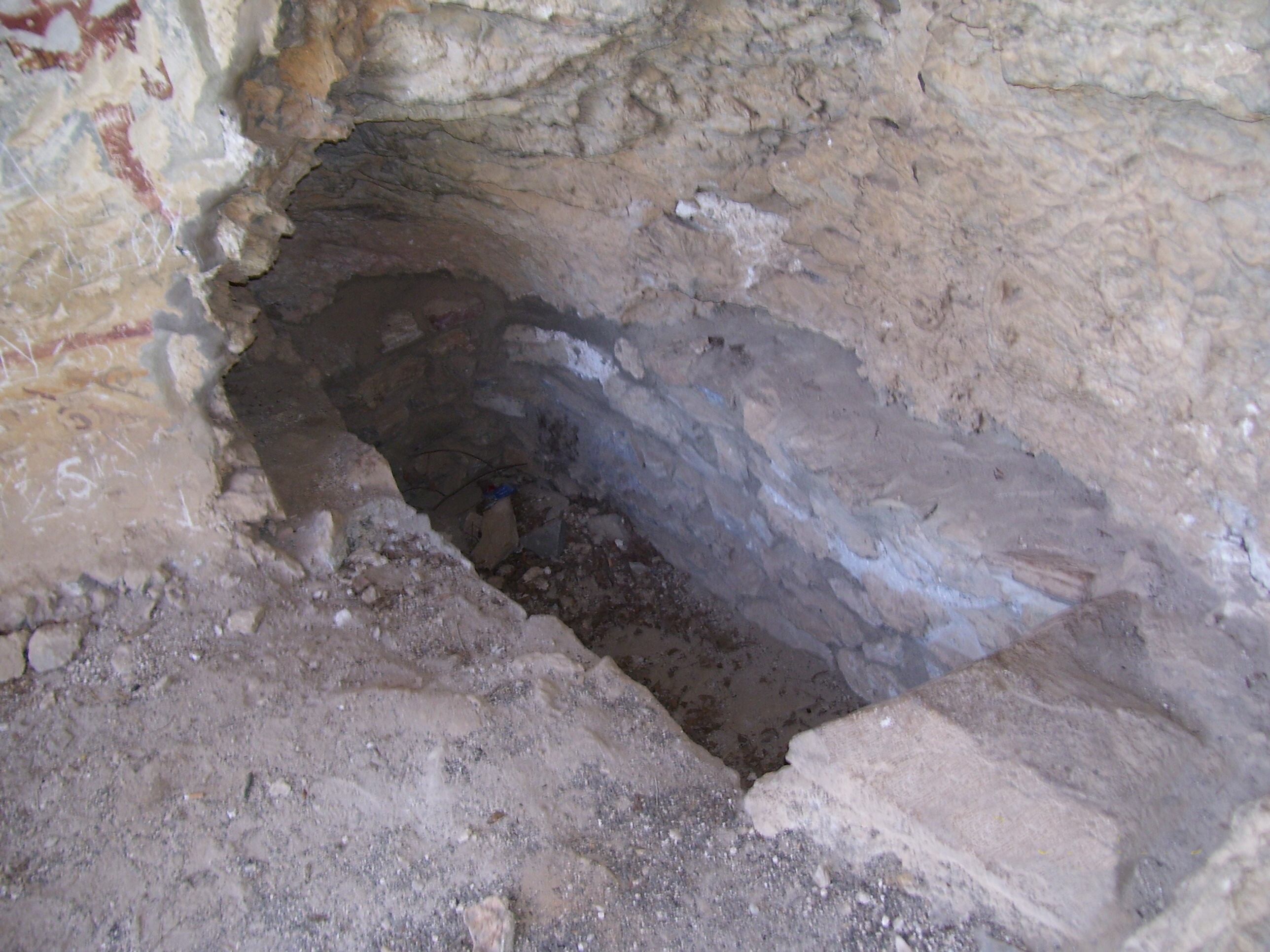
Former Peter of Koriša tomb

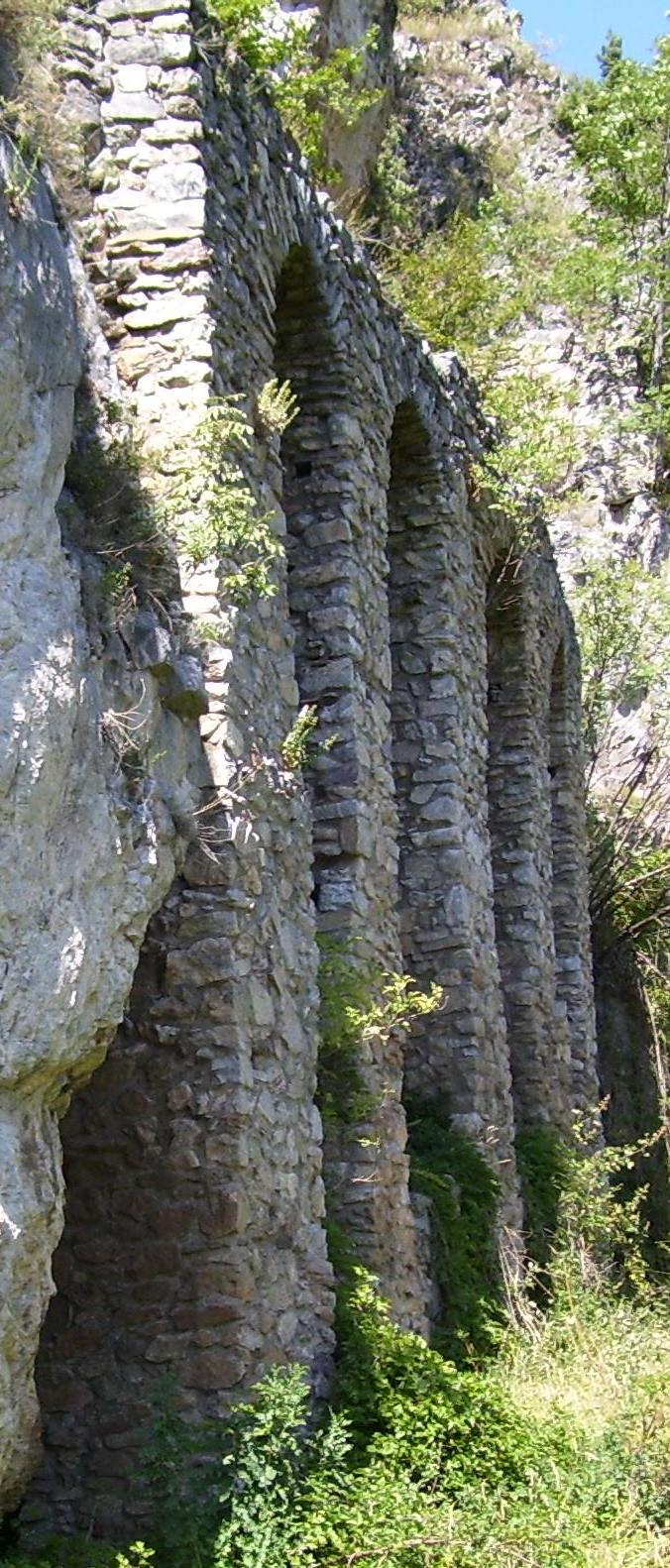
Hermitage pillars
