= Teodosije Šibalić =

Serbian Bishop of Raška-Prizren

Teodosije
- Bishop of Raška and Prizren
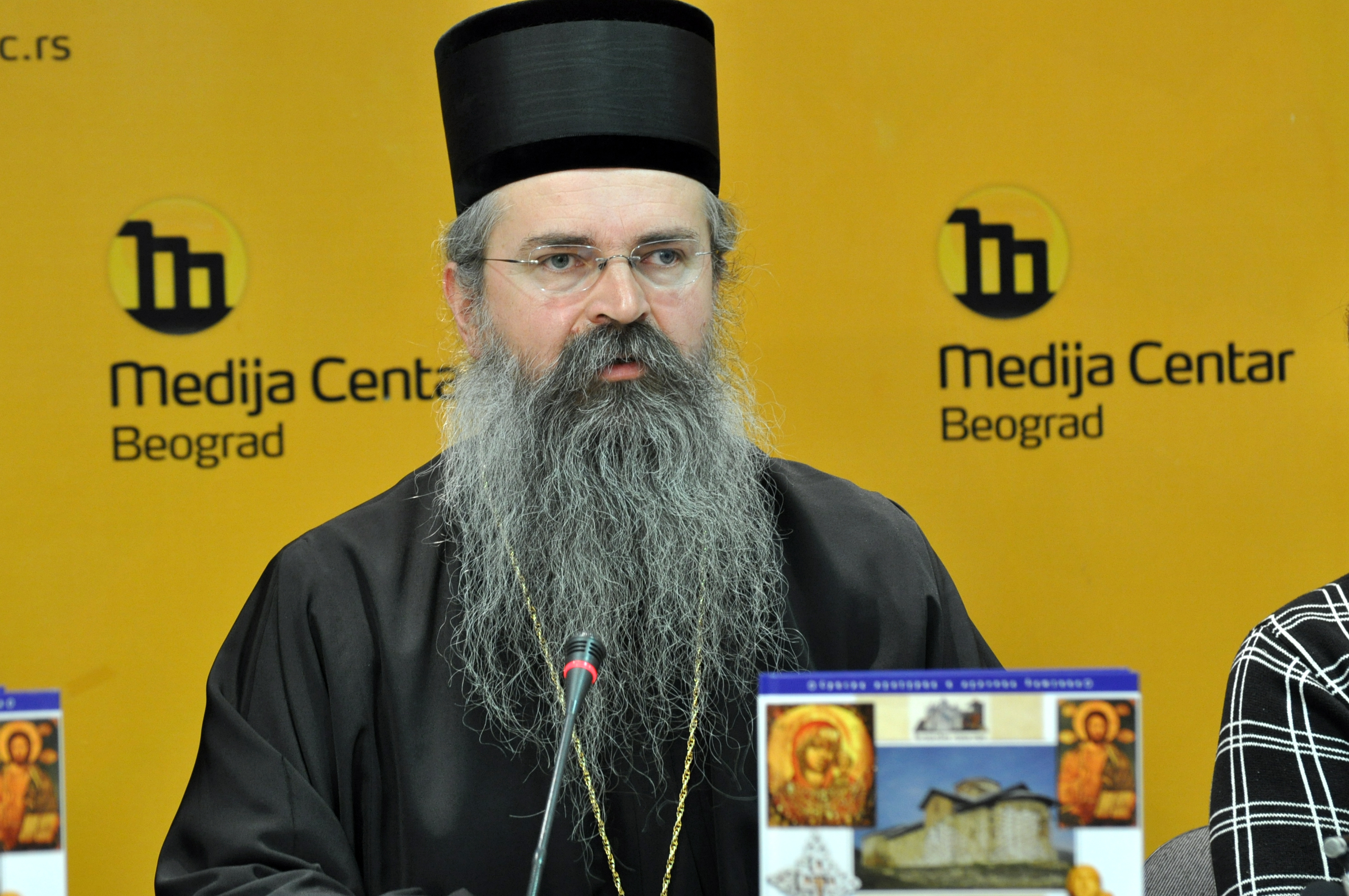
- Bishop Teodosije
- Native name: Живко Шибалић
- Church: Serbian Orthodox Church
- Installed: 18 November 2010
- Predecessor: Artemije Radosavljević

Personal details
- Born: Živko Šibalić; 29 June 1963 (age 63) Čačak, SFR Yugoslavia
- Denomination: Serbian Orthodox
- Residence: Gračanica Monastery
- Education: Faculty of Theology of the University of Belgrade

Bishop Teodosije (Serbian: Епископ Теодосије, secular name Živko Šibalić, born 29 June 1963) is a Serbian Bishop of Raška-Prizren within Serbian Orthodox Church. He was born in Čačak, Central Serbia.

== Biography ==
After finishing theology in the Faculty of Theology of the University of Belgrade, he became a novice in Crna Reka Monastery. Fr. Teodosije became a priest in 1992 in Ćelije Monastery. He was elected the abbot of Visoki Dečani Monastery in March 1992, and in May 2004 he was ordained an auxiliary (titular) bishop of Lipljan. On November 18, 2010, Bishop Teodosije was elected as a new Bishop of Raška-Prizren by the Bishops' Council of the Serbian Orthodox Church.

== See also ==
- Eparchy of Raška and Prizren
