= Ujmir =

Ujmir: Ujmir (Albanian); Добра вода/Dobra Voda (Serbian)
- Village
- Location within Kosovo
- Coordinates: 42°36′46″N 20°42′22″E
- Country: Kosovo
- District: Peja
- Municipality: Klina

Population (2024)
  - Total: 318
- Time zone: UTC+1 (Central European Time)
  - Summer (DST): UTC+2 (CEST)

Ujmir is a village in Klina municipality, Kosovo. It is located south of the Klina River.

== Name ==
The name of the settlement translates to good water (Albanian: ujë-water, mirë-good).

== History ==
In the 1330 Chrysobulls of Dečani, the settlement is recorded as Ujnemir. During the Colonization of Kosovo 14 Serb and Montenegrin families settled in Ujmir.

== Demographics ==
There are 544 inhabitants in Ujmir as of 2011, 541 of them being Albanian, 1 being a Serb and 2 others.

== Notable people ==
- Petar of Koriša
