= Mirza Golubica =

Bosnia-Herzegovinian footballer (born 1965)

Personal information
- Date of birth: 18 May 1965 (age 61)
- Place of birth: Ribariće, SFR Yugoslavia
- Height: 1.83 m (6 ft 0 in)
- Position: Forward

Senior career*
| Years | Team | Apps | (Gls) |
| 1982–1986 | Trepça | 49 | (4) |
| 1986–1990 | Čelik Zenica | 83 | (17) |
| 1990–1991 | Xerez CD | 31 | (5) |
| 1991–1992 | Borac Banja Luka | | |
| 1992–1993 | Varteks | 18 | (8) |
| 1993 | Karşıyaka SK | 7 | (0) |
| 1994 | Publikum Celje | 14 | (13) |
| 1994 | Varteks | 13 | (2) |
| 1995 | Segesta Sisak | 14 | (5) |
| 1995 | Croatia Zagreb | 1 | (0) |
| 1996 | Cibalia | 11 | (5) |
| 1996–1997 | 1. FC Nürnberg | 9 | (2) |
| 1997–1999 | Mladost 127 | 32 | (12) |
| 1999–2000 | Varteks | 14 | (1) |
| 2000–2001 | Aris Limassol | 7 | (2) |

Managerial career
- 2007–2008: NK Travnik
- * Club domestic league appearances and goals

Mirza Golubica (born 18 May 1965 in Ribarice) is a Bosnian-Herzegovinian football manager and former player.

== Career ==
During his playing career, Golubica played as forward for a great number of clubs. He started playing in Yugoslav Second Division clubs Trepça and NK Čelik Zenica before moving, in 1990 to Spain to play one season with Xerez CD in the Segunda División. Next season he was back to play in the last edition of the Yugoslav First League with FK Borac Banja Luka. In summer 1992 he moved to Croatia and played with NK Varteks in the first edition of the Croatian First League and he would play there for most of the 1990s. Beside playing with Varteks, where he will return in two more occasions, he also played for several other Croatian clubs, such as HNK Segesta, HNK Cibalia, NK Mladost 127, beside playing the first half of the 1995–96 season with Croatian giants NK Dinamo Zagreb (called "Croatia Zagreb" in that period) winning with them both, the national championship and also the Croatian Cup. During this period, he also had mostly short spells abroad, like in 1993 with Turkish Super League club Karşıyaka S.K., or 1994 with Slovenian First League club NK Publikum Celje and also in the 1996–97 season with 1. FC Nürnberg playing in the German 3. Liga that year. He retired in 2001 while playing with Aris Limassol F.C. in the Cypriot First Division.

After retiring, he has become a football manager.

== External sources ==
- Mirza Golubica at WorldFootball.net
- Mirza Golubica at BDFutbol
- Mirza Golubica at the Turkish Football Federation
- Mirza Golubica at www.mackolik.com (in Turkish)
