= Sima Igumanov =

Serbian merchant

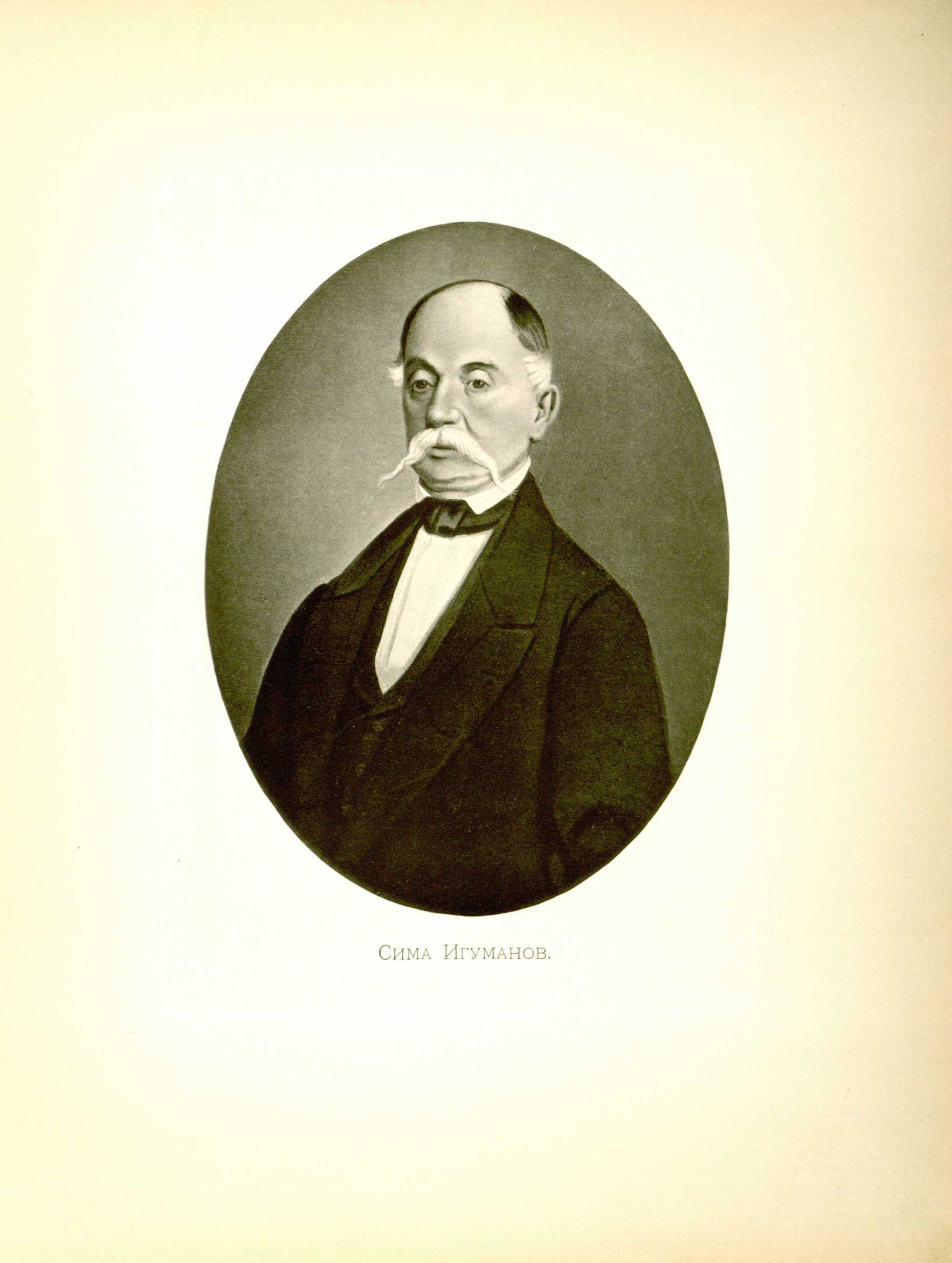
- Portrait of Igumanov
- Born: 30 January 1804; Prizren, Ottoman Empire
- Died: 24 February 1882 (aged 78); Prizren, Ottoman Empire
- Occupation: merchant

Sima Andrejević (Serbian Cyrillic: Сима Андрејевић; Prizren, January 30, 1804 — Prizren, February 24, 1882), known as Sima Igumanov, was a Serbian merchant who made a fortune through tobacco trade, and invested his fortune in building educational facilities for the common good.

== Biography ==
Andrejević was born in Prizren, Ottoman Empire into an ethnic Serb family. He had two older brothers, Kraguj and Petar. Their father bought ammunition to the Serbian revolutionaries for all of his wealth, and the older brothers joined the fight. He was orphaned at an early age, and was taken in by the Monastery of St. Mark of Koriša, where he learnt to read and write and was further educated. When he came of age, he took up working in a snuff factory, which was located along the Bistrica river in Prizren. Sima got a partner and started making capital doing this. In 1832 he married Sultane Drvarević and had two children: a daughter (Mana), and a son (Manojlo). By 1836, Mahmud Pasha Rotulla had fallen in disfavor with the High Porte, and an imperial servant called Tangr-Oglu had come to Prizren to take over the Pasha's territory and rule it. He taxed all the snuff makers out of business. Sima Andrejević moved to Aleksinac where he tried to open another snuff factory, but it did not work out. He then moved to Monastir (Bitola) (in modern North Macedonia) to gather and sell leeches, but this business venture did not go well either because the Pasha of Monastir did not let him prosper. He sued the Pasha, and while the judicial proceedings were going on in Constantinople, Sima – despaired and with no more financial reserves left – risked it all and started trading in tobacco, which proved to be his calling. He made his fortune in tobacco trading in Constantinople and Odessa. He invested his fortune in building educational facilities for the common good. In 1872 he built a teachers' theological school in Prizren which produced a great number of theological students and teachers. In 1874, after the seminary had been opened, to honor the name of Sima Andrejevic, a marble plaque stating arrived from Belgrade stating: “The deserving and honorable citizen of the magnificent city of Russia, St. Petersburg, Sima Andrejevic – Igumanov, with origin from Prizren, builds for the benefit of his brothers, the orthodox Serb people, who live in his homeland, in eternal commemoration to himself – in Prizren, August 10, 1872.”

He was awarded Order of the Cross of Takovo and Order of Prince Danilo I.

== Bibliography ==
- Vladimir Boban, Sima A Igumanov, Zivot i delo, NUB "Ivo Andric," Pristina-Beograd, 2004
- Petar Kostic, Prosvetno-kulturni zivot pravoslavnih srba u Prizrenu i njegovoj okolini u XIX i pocetkom XX veka
