= Artemije Radosavljević =

Serbian Orthodox bishop (1935–2020)

His Grace Artemije Radosavljević PhD, ThD
- Bishop
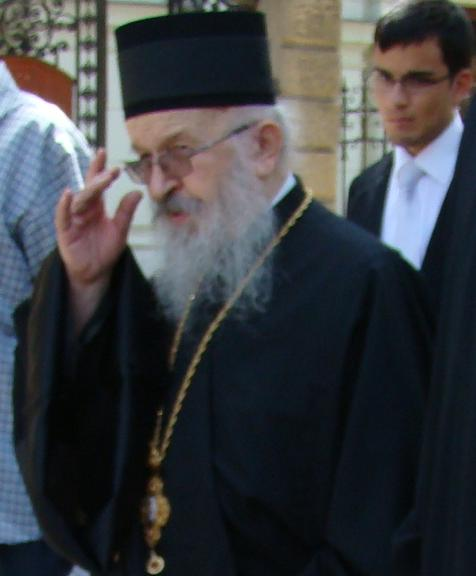
- Bishop Artemije in Sremski Karlovci in 2009
- Church: Serbian Orthodox Church
- Diocese: Eparchy of Raška and Prizren
- Installed: May 1991
- Retired: 5 May 2010
- Predecessor: Pavle (Stojčević)
- Successor: Teodosije (Šibalić)

Orders
- Ordination: 20 November 1960 by Justin (Popović)
- Consecration: 30 June 1991 by Patriarch Pavle

Personal details
- Born: Marko Radosavljević; 15 January 1935 Lelić, Kingdom of Yugoslavia
- Died: 21 November 2020 (aged 85) Valjevo, Serbia
- Denomination: Eastern Orthodoxy
- Education: University of Belgrade

Artemije Radosavljević (Serbian Cyrillic: Артемије Радосављевић; 15 January 1935 – 21 November 2020) was a Serbian Orthodox bishop who served as the head of the Eparchy of Raška and Prizren from 1991 until his removal in 2010.

He was removed from his position due to alleged embezzlement of funds.

== Biography ==
=== Early life ===
Bishop Artemije was born as Marko Radosavljević in the village of Lelić (the same village that St. Nikolaj Velimirović was born in). In his youth, he met Archmandrite St. Justin Popović who was living in Ćelije Monastery at the time. After finishing theology school, Popović received him as a monk at Ćelije Monastery on 20 November 1960. As with his mentor Popović, Artemije during his clerical career was staunchly against ecumenism and perceived it as dangerous for the purity of Orthodox religion.

Upon graduating from the University of Belgrade Faculty of Orthodox Theology, he signed up for graduate school in Athens where he successfully defended his doctoral thesis with the topic titled The Secret of Salvation According to Saint Maximus the Confessor. He then retired to the Crna Reka Monastery where he spent the next thirteen years.

During the Communist Yugoslav state period, Artemije was a teacher at Orthodox seminaries and toward the late 1970s he was in charge of the Crna Reka Monastery, located in Raška. Due to his charisma, over time he expanded a community of monks, many of whom were highly educated, and Artemije's achievement was rare for Orthodoxy under communism. In the 1980s the situation in the Socialist Autonomous Province of Kosovo deteriorated and many clergy who were his disciples travelled to the region and revived Orthodox Serb monasteries.

=== As bishop ===
He was chosen as Bishop of the Eparchy of Raška and Prizren in May 1991 to replace Pavle who had been the Bishop of that eparchy before enthronement as Patriarch.

Artemije surprised some observers in 1997 when he broke with Serbian President Slobodan Milošević and supported democratic ideas. Apart from his uncompromising theological positions, Artemije was of the view that Kosovo could only be retained by Serbia if its future was multicultural and democratic that could attract Albanians, as opposed to being mainly Orthodox and Serbian. Artemije, aware of Serb war crimes in the region stated that a positive image was needed for Serbia in order to retain Kosovo. He gave speeches to the Serbian opposition and to international audiences that warned about the repression of the Milošević government toward Albanians in destroying Serb-Albanian interethnic relations. Artemije added that only democracy in Serbia could control Albanian secessionist attempts and put an end to problems like injustice or manipulation.

From 1997 until the 1999 war Artemije had seen the forces of Milošević engage in combat against the Kosovo Liberation Army (KLA) and civilians that spread anti-Serbian sentiments among local Albanians. At the time, two disciples of Artemije influenced his democratic phase, Sava Janjić, his secretary in Kosovo and the Abbot Teodosije Šibalić. Artemije became a prominent figure of the Serbian opposition toward Milošević during 1997-2000 and his views on democratisation spread to others within the Serbian Orthodox Church (SOC). After the Kosovo war (1999), Artemije called for the extradition of Milošević to the International Criminal Tribunal for the former Yugoslavia (ICTY).

He was of the view that a NATO peace keeping force (KFOR) would protect Kosovo Serbs and their cultural heritage and property more effectively than the previous police serving the Milošević government. The change in his views occurred after the 2004 unrest in Kosovo when KFOR was unable to prevent the displacement of 4,000 Serbs, 950 wounded and 19 killed, along with the destruction of 35 Orthodox churches that made Artemije lose confidence in the International Community. Due to the pro-Albanian position of the West and following the Kosovo conflict, Artemije broadened his theological anti-Western sentiments. These entailed critique of the other Christian denominations as heretical except the Orthodox faith and included political aspects of anti-Westernism in relation to perceived double standards by the West in Kosovo.

Artemije, who was an important figure for Kosovo Serbs in discussions with international organisations, decreased his contact with representatives from the West and Kosovo police (KFOR). During the late Milošević period those contacts were needed to lobby overseas, yet they were not as effective to shift Western support for Kosovo Albanians. Artemije sought support within the United States and Russia, from nationalist politicians based in Belgrade as a potential ally and in his travels warned audiences that a Kosovo controlled by Albanians would become a place of criminality and Muslim terrorism against Christians. During his travels in the United States, Artemije sought to capitalise on events in Iraq and public outrage over atrocities by attempting to portray the KLA as "Islamic terrorists" and link them with "jihadi terror practices" and "jihadi terror movements" committing violent acts against "Christian Serb victims". Serb president Boris Tadić and most of the bishops negatively viewed the actions of Artemije. The Bishops' Council transferred many of Artemije's duties that involved public relations to Abbot Teodosije in 2005.

By 2006 in discussions over Kosovo religious sites, part of the SOC delegations privately expressed concerns to Western representatives about Artemije speaking at the first meeting. Artemije also litigated in the European Court of Human Rights against NATO countries that had zones where the unrest of 2004 occurred and it resulted in the Holy Synod withdrawing their support of him, as they viewed the action as radical. In negotiations with Kosovo Albanian counterparts, Artemije made public comments and often called them "terrorists". Upon Joe Biden's visit to Serbia, Bishop Artemije did not give his blessing for Biden to visit the Visoki Dečani monastery. Artemije wrote and published a strongly worded letter titled Dečani and Bondsteel – first Tadić now Biden but the Bishops' Council denounced the decision and publicly expressed regret that Artemije made that decision.

In February 2010, the SOC removed Artemije from performing his religious duties in his diocese and forced him to retire due to alleged embezzlement of funds. The matter involved Simeon Vilovski, his secretary and Predrag Subotički, a building contractor and the improper use of donations, humanitarian assistance and subsidies from the state along with lobbying in the US and growth of personal finances. Some people within Serbian media stated that Artemije was barely involved in the matter and his removal was based on political motives due to his uncompromising stance that made him a problem for the SOC and president Tadić. At the time Artemije refused to accept the decision by the Bishops' Council that demoted him to the status of a monk, on 19 November 2010. Artemije also refused to voluntarily leave his church role and with support from his congregation and others he continued to perform ecclesiastical work. The removal of Artemije was meant to serve as an example to other bishops who might engage in problematic behavior, yet since the dismissal the church has not pursued other clergy with larger issues. Artemije's public appearances made him a problem for the SOC, such as in 2011 when he asked openly about how the status of Kosovo would be resolved.

On 28 May 2015, the Bishops' Council officially excommunicated Artemije from the Serbian Orthodox Church, making him the first bishop to be excommunicated in the church's history.

=== Health and death ===
On 21 November 2020, Artemije died in Valjevo, from complications of COVID-19 during the COVID-19 pandemic in Serbia. He died in an ambulance on his way from Valjevo Hospital to University Hospital Center Dr Dragiša Mišović in Belgrade.

== Eparchy of Raška and Prizren in exile ==
The Eparchy of Raška and Prizren in exile is an uncanonical and unrecognized eparchy that separated from the Serbian Orthodox Church after its first bishop Artemije Radosavljević was defrocked as head of the Eparchy of Raška and Prizren. A number of the laity and the clergy of this diocese that did not oblige the decision of the Serbian Orthodox Church founded a parallel diocese, which hasn't been recognized by any Orthodox Churches. After Artemije's death, the sect is headed by his disciple and follower, bishop Ksenofont Tomašević.

Eastern Orthodox Church titles
Preceded by Pavle Stojčević	Bishop of Raška and Prizren; 1991–2010	Succeeded by Teodosije Šibalić
