= Pajsijević =

Coordinates: 43°52′39″N 20°44′05″E

- Interactive map of Pajsijević
- Country: Serbia
- Municipality: Knić
- Time zone: UTC+1 (CET)
  - Summer (DST): UTC+2 (CEST)

Pajsijević (Serbian Cyrillic: Пајсијевић) is a Serbian village, located in the municipality of Knić, in the district of Šumadija. In 2002, it had 545 inhabitants.

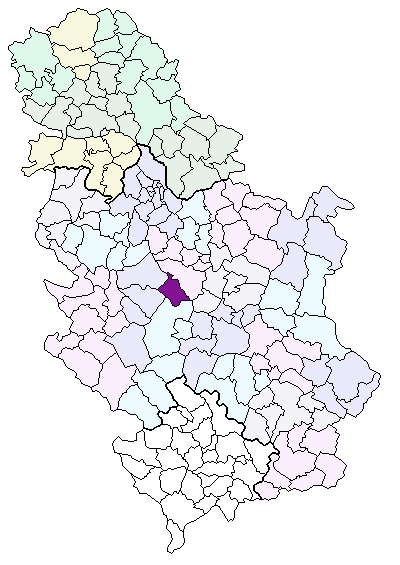
Location of the municipality of Knić in Serbia
