= Crniš =

Crniš Црниш
- Village
- Location within Montenegro
- Country: Montenegro
- Municipality: Bijelo Polje

Population (2011)
  - Total: 58
- Time zone: UTC+1 (CET)
  - Summer (DST): UTC+2 (CEST)

Crniš (Montenegrin Cyrillic: Црниш) is a village in the municipality of Bijelo Polje, Montenegro.

== Demographics ==
According to the 2003 census, the village had a population of 170.

According to the 2011 census, its population was 58.

Ethnicity in 2011
| Ethnicity | Number | Percentage |
|---|---|---|
| Bosniaks | 49 | 84.5% |
| other/undeclared | 9 | 15.5% |
| Total | 58 | 100% |
