= Ljuljaci =

Coordinates: 44.0167°N 20.6667°E

- Village
- Interactive map of Ljuljaci
- Country: Serbia
- Time zone: UTC+1 (CET)
  - Summer (DST): UTC+2 (CEST)

Ljuljaci (Serbian Cyrillic: Љуљаци) is a village located in the Knić municipality in the Šumadija District, Serbia. According to the 2002 census there was 369 people inhabiting the village, in 1991 the number was 475.

Dragoslav Srejović, a famous Serbian archaeologist and academic traces his family origin (Srejovići) to this village, he has organized the excavations of the prehistoric Bronze Age tumuli which he defined of the Racha-Ljuljaci cultural group, a local variant of the Vatin culture. Triballi (Thracian) tombs have been found on the site. The village is a former gradina.
