= Vitanovac =

Coordinates: 43°43′N 20°47′E

Vitanovac Витановац (Serbian)
- Village (Selo)
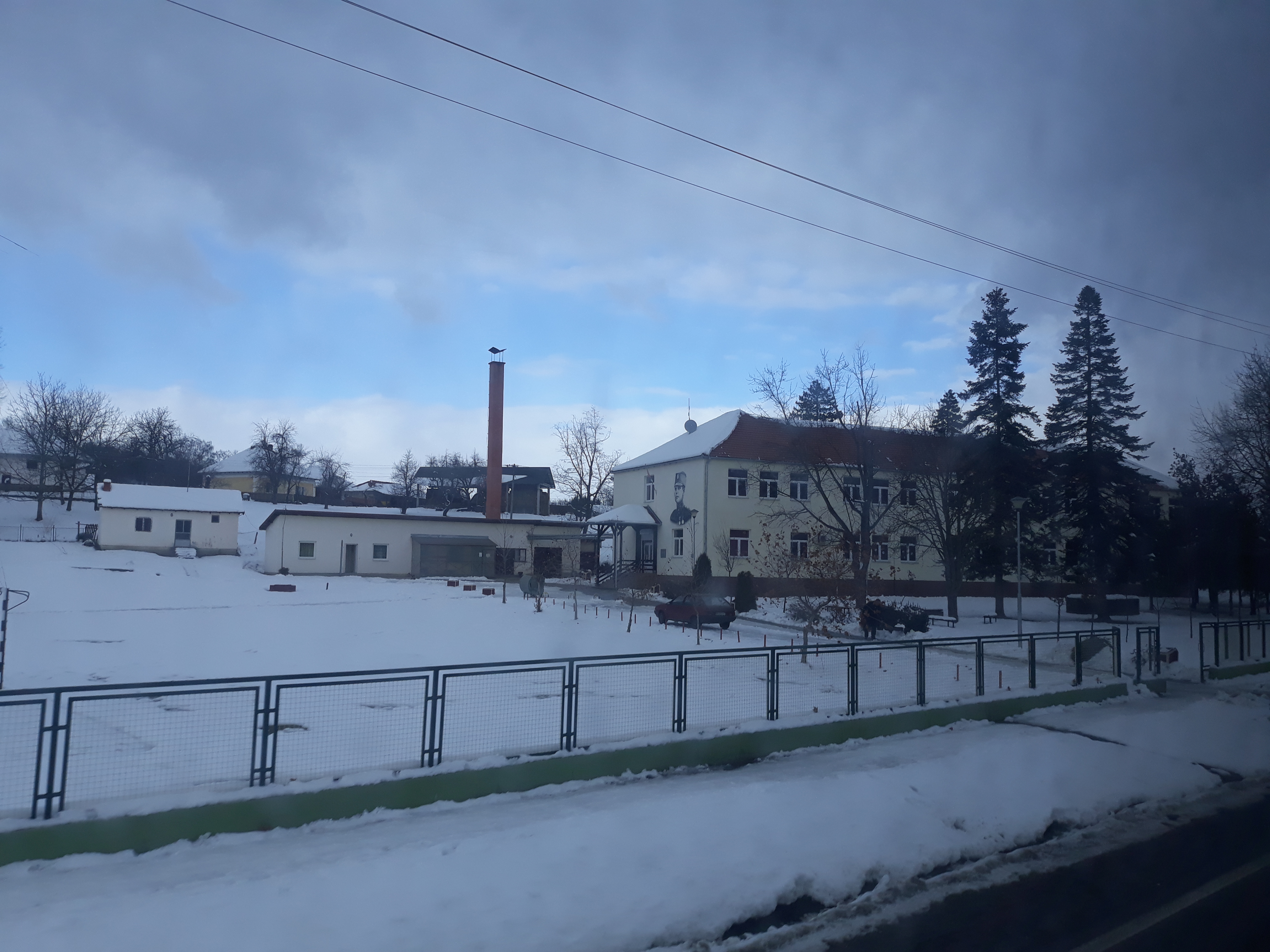
- Interactive map of Vitanovac
- Country: Serbia
- District: Raška District
- Municipality: Kraljevo
- Time zone: UTC+1 (CET)
  - Summer (DST): UTC+2 (CEST)

Vitanovac is a village situated in Kraljevo municipality in Serbia., 30 miles south of Kragujevac. During World War I it was the location of a "Vitanovatz Dispensary" where nurses from the U.K. and British Commonwealth came to the aid of Serbia and in late 1915 with the Serbian army retreated through Montenegro and Albania to Greece instead of surrendering to the Central Powers.

== See also ==
- Mabel St Clair Stobart
