= Gruža (Knić) =

Gruža Гружа
- Village
- Location of Gruža within Serbia
- Coordinates: 43°53′45″N 20°46′17″E
- Country: Serbia
- District: Šumadija
- Municipality: Knić

Area
  - Total: 0.19 km^{2} (0.073 sq mi)
- Elevation: 240 m (790 ft)

Population (2011 census)
  - Total: 153
  - Density: 810/km^{2} (2,100/sq mi)
- Time zone: UTC+1 (CET)
  - Summer (DST): UTC+2 (CEST)
- Postal code: 34230
- Area code: +381(0)34
- Car plates: KG

The Gruža (Serbian Cyrillic: Гружа; pronounced [ɡrûʒa]) is a village located in the municipality of Knić, central Serbia. The village is located near the Gruža Lake dam, few kilometers to the north from the river. It is a typical example of the stretched road village along the Kragujevac–Kraljevo road and railway. It is a small, depopulating settlement with a population of 153 inhabitants (as of 2011 census).
