= Korishë, Prizren =

Korishë Кориша Koriša
- Village
- Location within Kosovo
- Coordinates: 42.257603°N 20.798058°E
- Location: Kosovo
- District: Prizren
- Municipality: Prizren

Population (2024)
  - Total: 2,758
- Time zone: UTC+1 (CET)
  - Summer (DST): UTC+2 (CEST)

Korishë (Serbian Cyrillic: Кориша; romanized: Koriša) is a village in the Prizren Municipality in southern Kosovo.

== History ==
Prior to the Ottoman expansion into the region, Korishë was a large settlement that extended out into the Brešta ridge to the east of the village. The area surrounding the village had nine Serbian Orthodox sites including the Hermitage of St. Peter of Koriša and Monastery of St. Mark of Koriša scattered within the Brešta ridge.

At the turn of the 20th century, the population demographics of Koriša changed. Prior to 1912, there were between 30 and 40 Serbian households and by 1940, only 25 Serb homes remained with many Serb families moving permanently to Belgrade, Prizren and Niš. Throughout this time, many Albanians moved down from settlements on the Kabash Mountain into Korishë. By 1940, there were 54 Albanian households. During the Yugoslav colonisation of Kosovo, 11 Serbo-Montenegrin colonist families were settled in the locality of Korisha-Kabashi.

During World War II, in the village of Korisha near Prizren, Albanians destroyed the 14th-century Serbian Church of St. Peter.

=== Kosovo War ===
During the Kosovo War, the village was the site of the NATO-ordered Koriša bombing, which resulted in the deaths of roughly 100 civilians.

== Notable sites ==
There are 3 artificial waterfalls, which are being visited by a lot of Tourists all around Kosovo.

On the right side of Kabash Mountain, in an area called Gralishtë, is a large, unfinished castle. It dates from the 5th to 6th century.
