= Parecclesion =

Side mortuary chapel in early Byzantine churches

A parecclesion (Greek: παρεκκλήσιον, translated as "Chapel," romanized: parekklesion, lit. 'side-church') is a side mortuary chapel found in early Byzantine churches.

The parecclesion was often used for ceremonial and funerary purposes, which often consisted of services performed before burial, as well as services performed after to commemorate the individuals who have departed. This was a significant process that helped guide the community and helped the community understand the passage of the departed. The ceremonies were arranged as soon as a person would pass away.

Many characteristics form a parecclesion, for instance, the church in which it is located, is an architectural aspect, most significant for its exterior and interior design. The similarities of parecclesions are how they are an additional chapel separate from the main church, which is why it is labeled as 'side chapel.' The parecclesion holds an important role in unifying the human and the Divine. Most churches are sacred places considered to be a “Heaven on Earth.” Because of its exterior and interior design, such as the inclusion of high ceilings and the iconography of religious figures depicted on the walls, it helps maintain a divine experience. They are typically adorned with Frescos portraying religious figures, while addressing various themes such as resurrection, salvation, hope, Life after death, etc. These depicted scenes show the viewer what to expect at the end of time.

There are two examples of existing parecclesions:

- Chora Church or Kariye Mosque (Museum)
- Pammakaristos Church

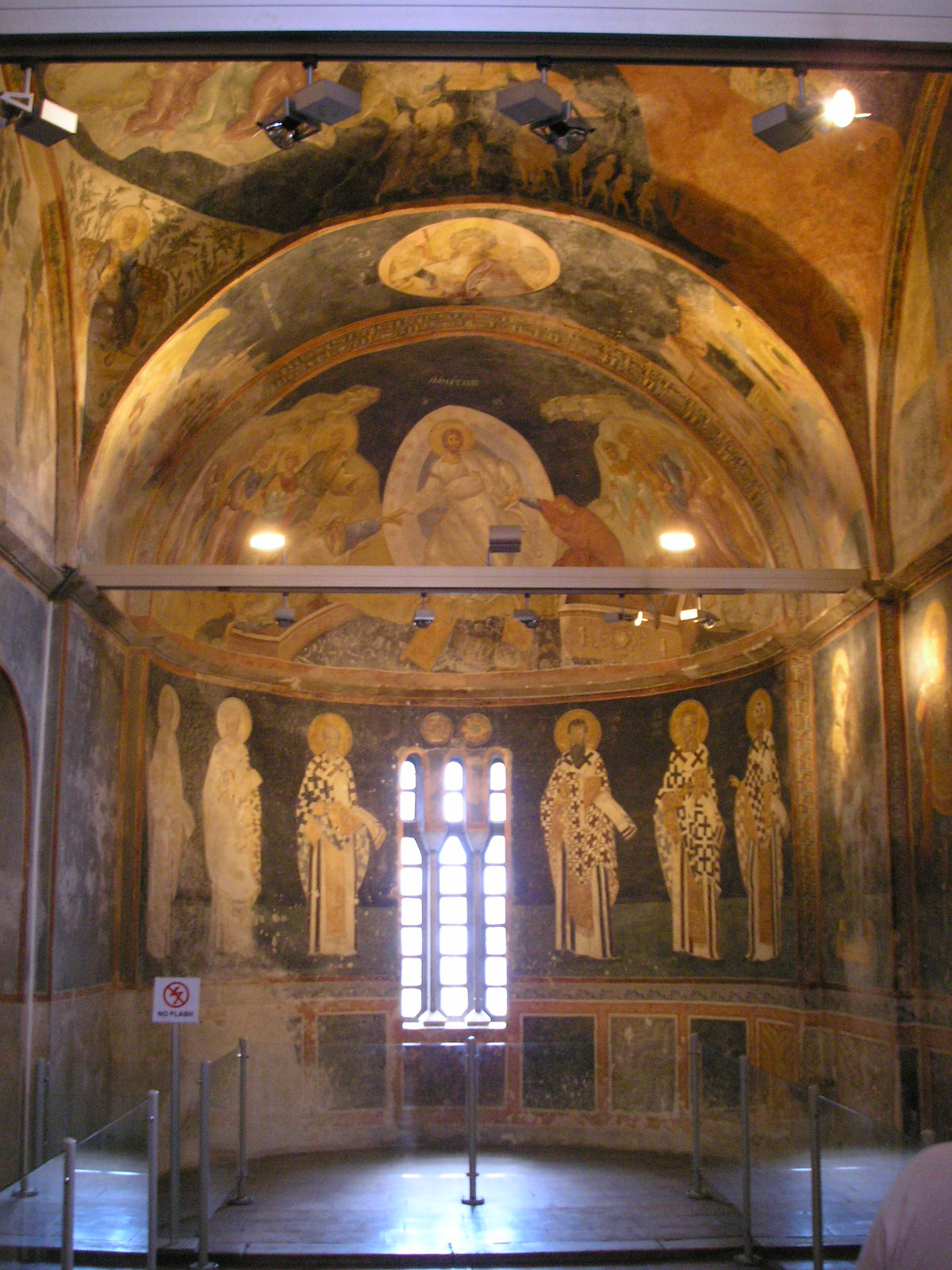
Parecclesion, c. 1316-1321, Chora Church, Constantinople (Istanbul)

== Byzantine Art ==
The Roman Empire, also referred to as the Byzantine Empire, began in 330 B.C. During this time, Constantine the Great, who was the Emperor of the Byzantine Empire, decided to convert to Christianity, which expanded Christianity throughout his empire. Byzantine art has a close association to the ceremonies that were being executed inside the pareclessions, religious beliefs were now being manifested inside the parecclesions. Some of the artistic creations included in the parecclesion were- Mosaics and frescos. During the Byzantine Empire, most art with in the pareclessions centered religious icons, which is why religious figures are commonly found throughout the interior of Byzantine churches.

Byzantine art is divided into three periods because of its diverse range of art styles throughout the years. Early Byzantine art (c. 330- 750), Middle Byzantine art (c. 850-1204), and late Byzantine art (c.1261-1453). Early Byzantine art was created during the rule of Emperor Constantine, who adopted Christianity. Religious Icons such as the Virgin (Theotokos)and Child between saints (Theodore and George), as well as Jesus Christ, are depicted often. These illustrations of religious figures served a spiritual purpose, which was to encapsulate a heavenly realm in these structures Middle Byzantine art was an era of the revitalization of classical forms and motifs. The material gold (leaf) was common during this period. Finally, Late Byzantine art consisted of religious iconography and utilized symbolic imagery. The incorporation of gold continued, but was more common during middle Byzantine art.

== Chora Parecclesion ==
The Chora Church or Kariye Mosque (now a museum) is located in Istanbul, Turkey. It is a prime example of Byzantine architecture which is also known for its incorporation of Byzantine art. It was once a church that was a part of a Monastery of Byzantine. The Chora holds a parecclesion rebuilt by Theodore Metochites, a wealthy official, who added the parecclesion to the Chora from 1316 to 1321 which was the fifth phase of construction in the church.

=== Funeral rituals ===
Like previously mentioned, the parecclesion was meant to serve as a chapel for ceremonial and funerary purposes. They took place in the parecclesion under the dome of the west bay, and were often done before burial and after as well to commemorate those who passed. The rituals followed a specific procedure. This process included washing and dressing the body of the deceased individual, and then placing the body inside the coffin where it then would be taken to the parecclesion. Once there, a prayer is read over the coffin, as a way to protect the soul of the deceased individual during its spiritual transition. The services and rituals at the parecclesion could be done without disturbing those attending for regular use of the church and the Narthexes since there it is an additional chapel of the church. Theodore Metochites added the parecclesion and was buried in that chapel once he passed in c.1332. An additional eight tombs were added after the place was decorated.

=== Architecture ===
The exterior of the parecclesion has unique architectural elements that makes it distinctive. For instance, one being its intricate design. The exterior of the parreclesion incorporates middle Byzantine elements, such as a sloping site and its adding additional chambers. Another element that makes the architecture unique is its reconstructions and additions. The Parreclesion already is an addition chamber added to the side of the church, but it was also one of the many parts of the church that was reconstructed in the fourteenth century. Some of the reconstruction that was done in the parecclesion was its modification to support the original arches. The original arches in the parecclesion were made very thick, causing them to be very heavy. The structure needed reinforcement of the columns to provide support for the structure.

=== Interior ===
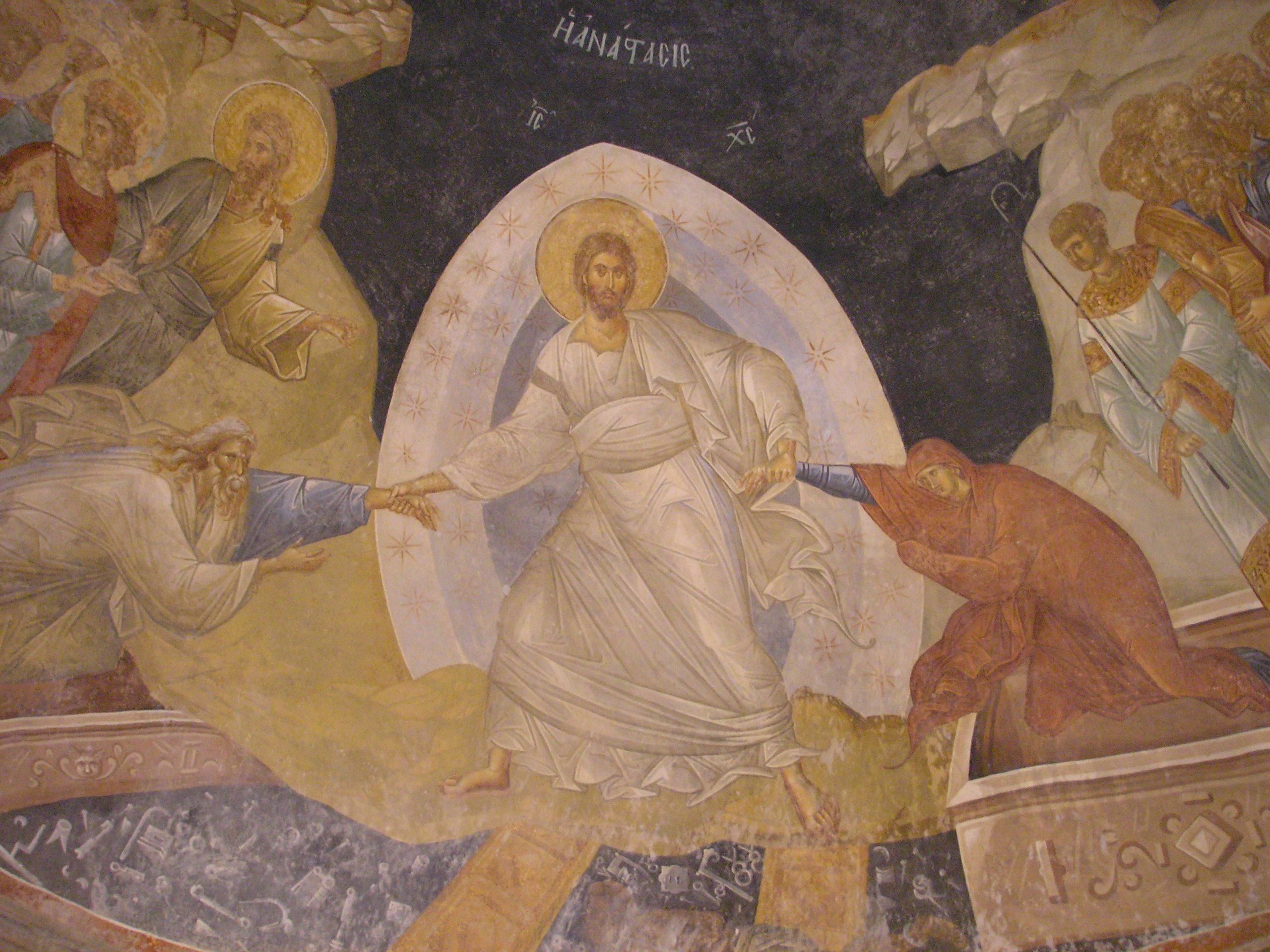
The Anastasis, c. 1316-1321, Chora Church, Constantinople (Istanbul) The Last Judgement, c. 1316-1321, Chora Church, Constantinople (Istanbul)

The parecclesion is enwreathed in frescoes and mosaics that depict scenes from the life of the Virgin Mary and Christ. Byzantine art, characterized by their vivid colors, complex features, and realistic styles, demonstrate patron Theodore Metochites' optimism for redemption after death. The remarkable art pieces in the Choras Paracclesion include:

1. the Anastasis
2. The Last Judgement.
3. Virgin and Child
4. Heavenly Court of Angels
5. Two Panels of Moses

=== The Anastasis ===
The Anastasis fresco is located inside of the Choras parecclesion towards the end of the parecclesion, inside of the dome. Not only is the Anastasis fresco incredible to look at, it is an important fresco inside the Choras parecclesion for numerous reasons, one being its symbolism. The Anastasis fresco is a symbol of resurrection or rebirth, depicting Christ diving down into the underworld and vigorously pulling Adam and Eve out of their tombs. It also demonstrates his victory over death, his triumphal resurrection after his crucifixion, his divinity, and shows the salvation of two human souls . These themes within the parecclesion frescoes are important not just because there is a religious figure in them that they worship, but also because it sheds a light on a morbid topic, bringing a new perspective to the viewer about death. It encourages hope for salvation, that the "end," is not necessary the end of our lives, while also depicting Jesus using his power to help and guide

=== The Last Judgement ===
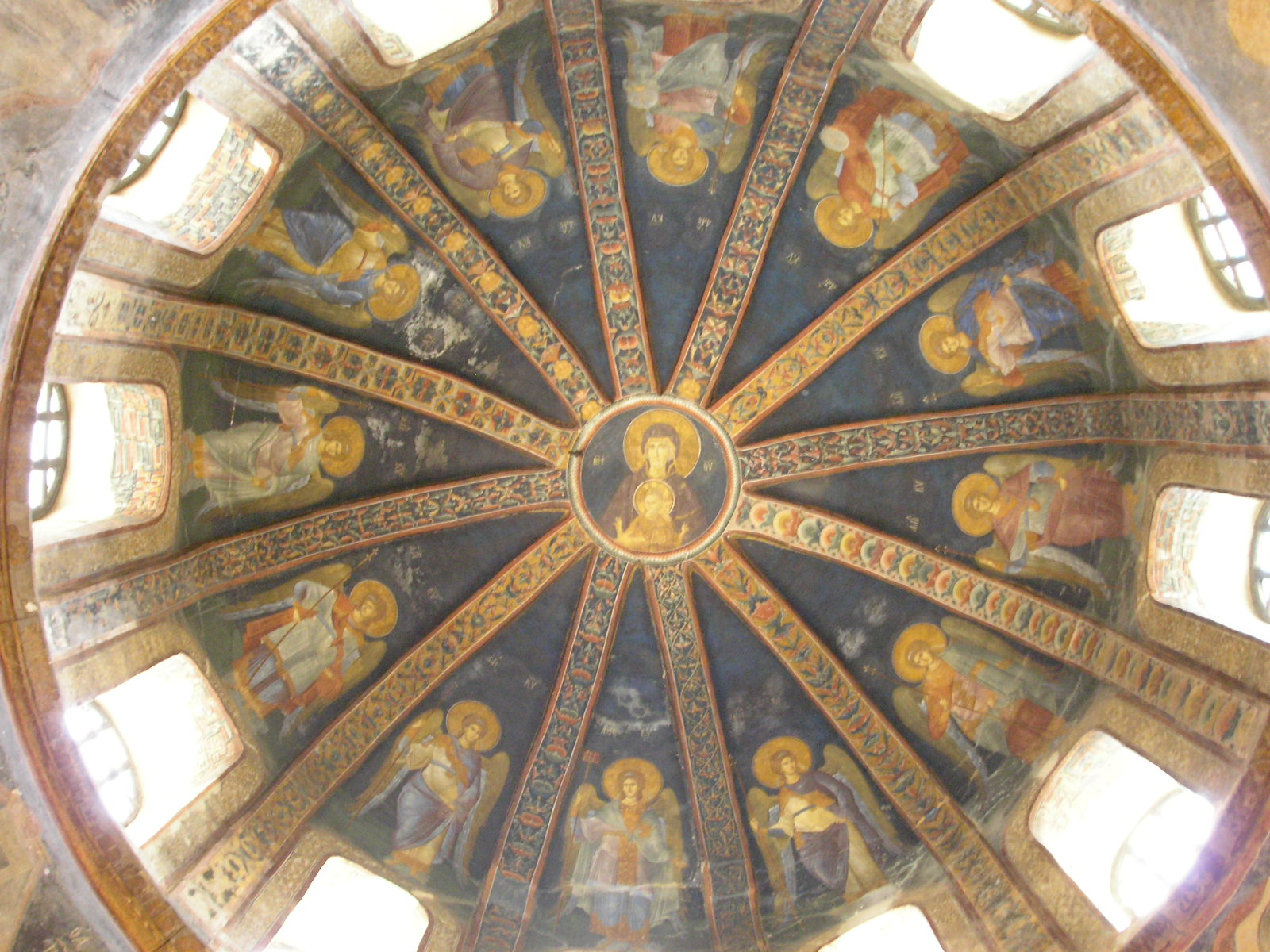
The Virgin and Child, painted on dome inside Chora parecclesion

The Last Judgement, similar to the Anastasis fresco, is another significant piece reflecting salvation and the afterlife. The Last Judgment is a part of a group of mosaics and frescoes in the parecclesion. The Last Judgment introduces a Christian and Catholic belief, which is when the world comes to an end, God will have the last Judgment by deciding every person's fate, either joining him in heaven, or spending your eternity in hell. Our freewill, our decisions we chose to act on, result in determining our eternal consequences.

=== Virgin and Child ===
The Virgin and Child is a fresco located in the dome of the parecclesion. It depicts Virgin Mary holding Jesus Christ right in the center of the dome surrounded by a host of angels. Looking up at the dome, the seams of the dome guide your eyes towards the Virgin and Child, showing that this piece is of great importance. Underneath the dome, Hymnographers appear on the pendentives of the dome. And underneath the pendentives, we see scenes from the Old Testament that portray "types" of the Virgin and Christ. By having images of the Virgin and Child, as well as prefigure events from the Old Testament that demonstrates the Christian stories of salvation, it plays an important role which is to serve as a testimony of the redemptive powers the Virgin and Child possess.

== Pammakaristos parecclesion ==
The Church of the pammakaristos, (also known as All-Blessed Mother of God), is another well known Byzantine structure located in Istanbul, Turkey, that holds a parecclesion (an addition side chapel) within it. The church was built somewhere between the eleventh and twelfth centuries, but the parecclesion of the church was not added until the thirteenth century (after 1310). The parecclesion of pammakaristos was used as a monumental chapel, which was built by Martha Gabas, attributed to her late husband Michael Doukas Glabas Tarchaneiotes, a Byzantine general and aristocrat of the Andronikos II Palaiologos, who was buried inside the chapel shortly after it was made.

This parecclesion was also used for similar functions as the Chora's parecclesion. Similar to the Chora, the pammakaristos parecclesion was used as a memorial chapel, later converted into a Mosque, and today the mosque remains as a museum with a restored parecclesion accessible to the public.

=== Architecture ===
The pammakaristos parecclesion has distinctive architectural elements. The exterior of the structure is composed of recessed brickwork. An inscription dedicated to Jesus Christ, is found on both the interior and exterior of the parecclesion. The interior of the parecclesion also has complex arches and vaults, as well as high ceilings. The parecclesion is about twenty feet wide. Because of its proportions, the light that shines through the parecclesion gives it a sense of divinity.

=== Interior ===
Although this church is a lot smaller, the pammakaristos church is known for its large collection of Byzantine mosaics. One mosaic that is actually found in the parecclesion is located under the dome, which shows Christ the pantocrator in the center of the dome, surrounded by old testament prophets. In this mosaics he is portrayed as the ruler and creator of the world. The twelve prophets- Moses, Joseph, Zephaniah, Micah, Joel, Zechariah, Obadiah, Habakkuk, Jonah, Malachi, Ezekiel, and Isaiah, are the prophets circled around the dome.
