= The Chora =

Medieval church and mosque in Istanbul

Kariye Mosque
- Greek: Μονή της Χώρας; Turkish: Kariye Camii
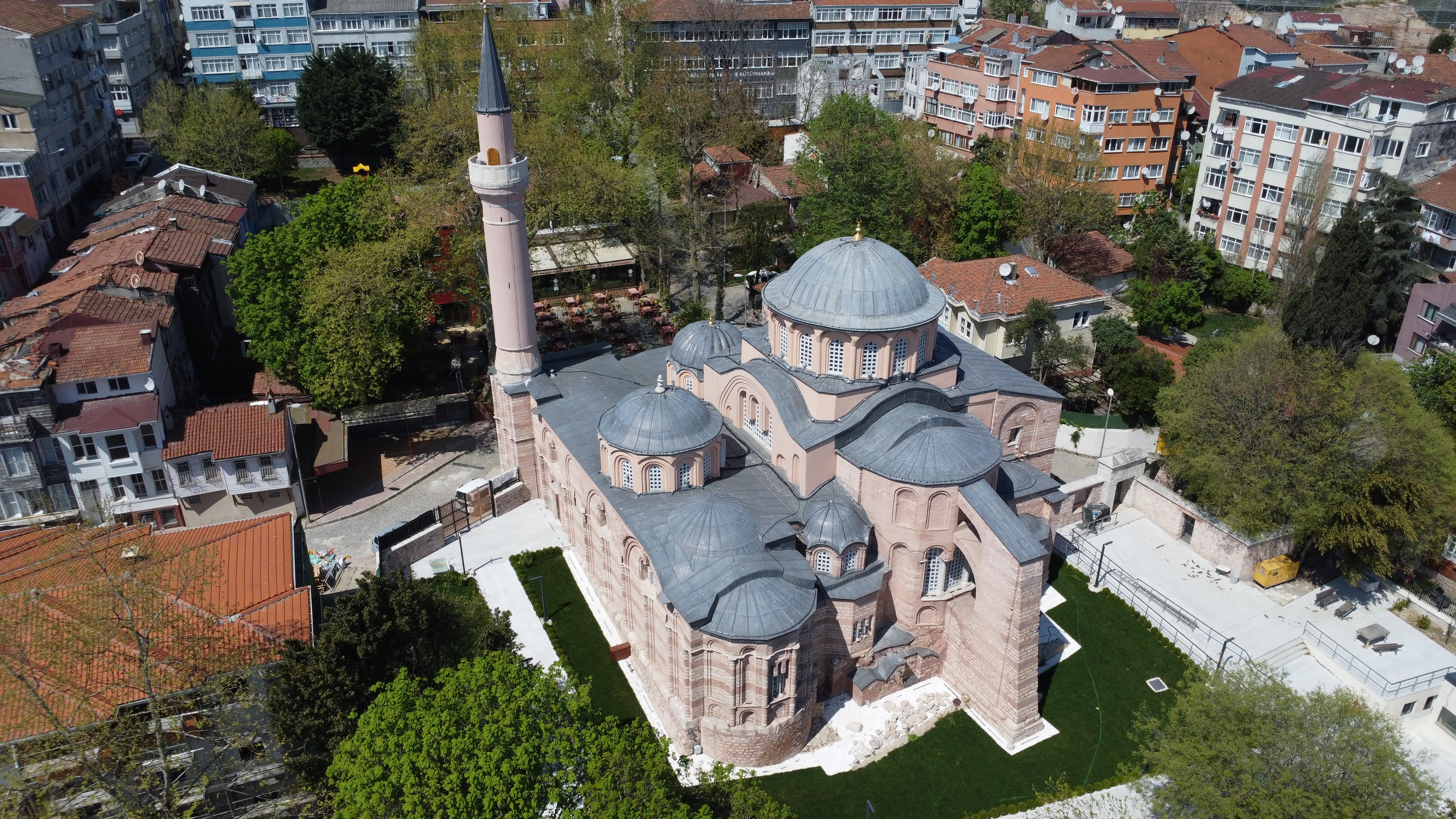
- 2024 perspective view

- Location within the Fatih district of Istanbul

Religion
- Affiliation: Greek Orthodox Church (before 1500), Sunni Islam (1500–1945, 2020–present), Directorate of Religious Affairs of Turkey (1924–1945, 2020–present)
- Status: Mosque (since 2020)

Location
- Location: Istanbul, Turkey
- Coordinates: 41°01′52″N 28°56′21″E

Architecture
- Type: Church
- Style: Byzantine architecture, Ottoman architecture, Islamic
- Minaret: 2

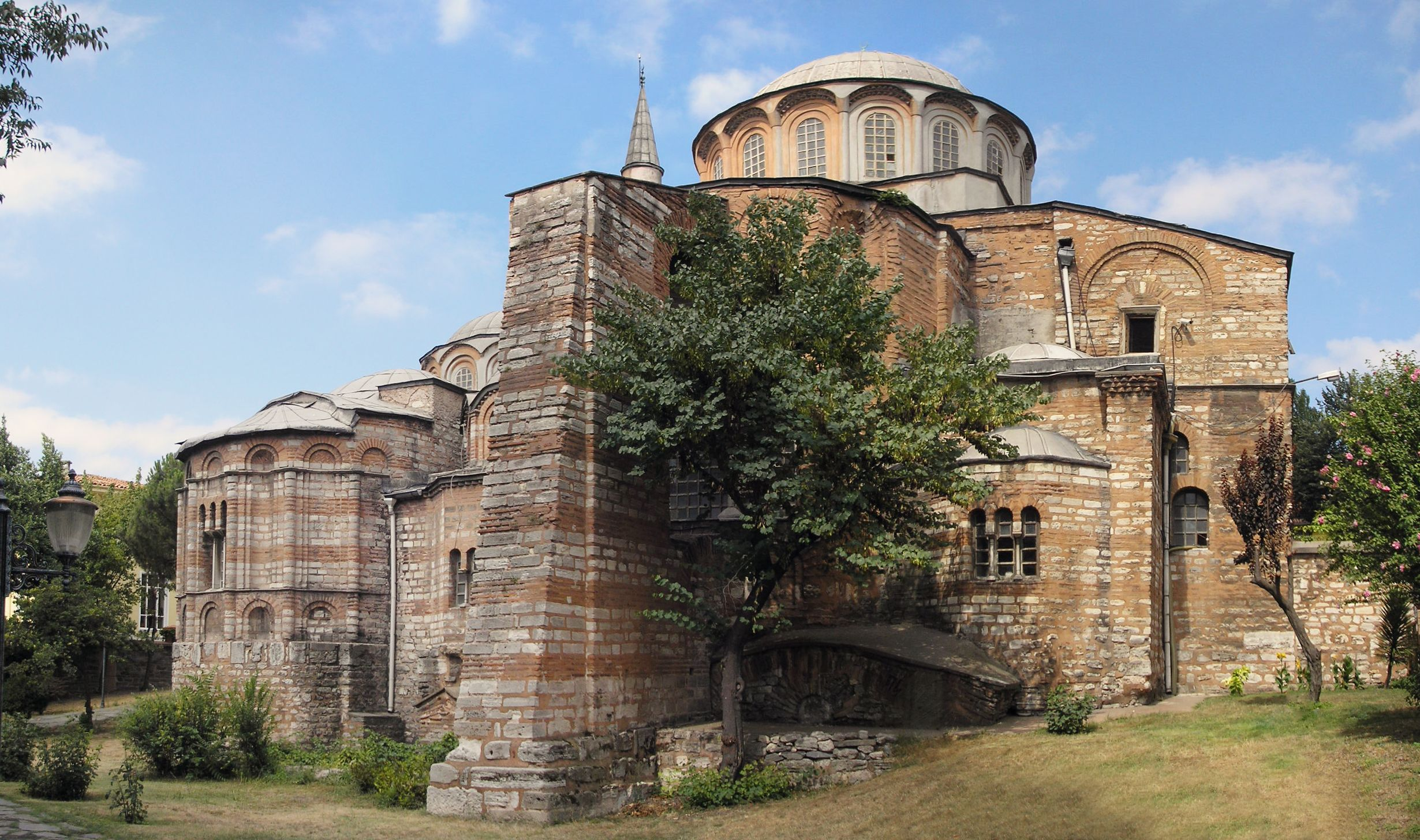
Exterior rear

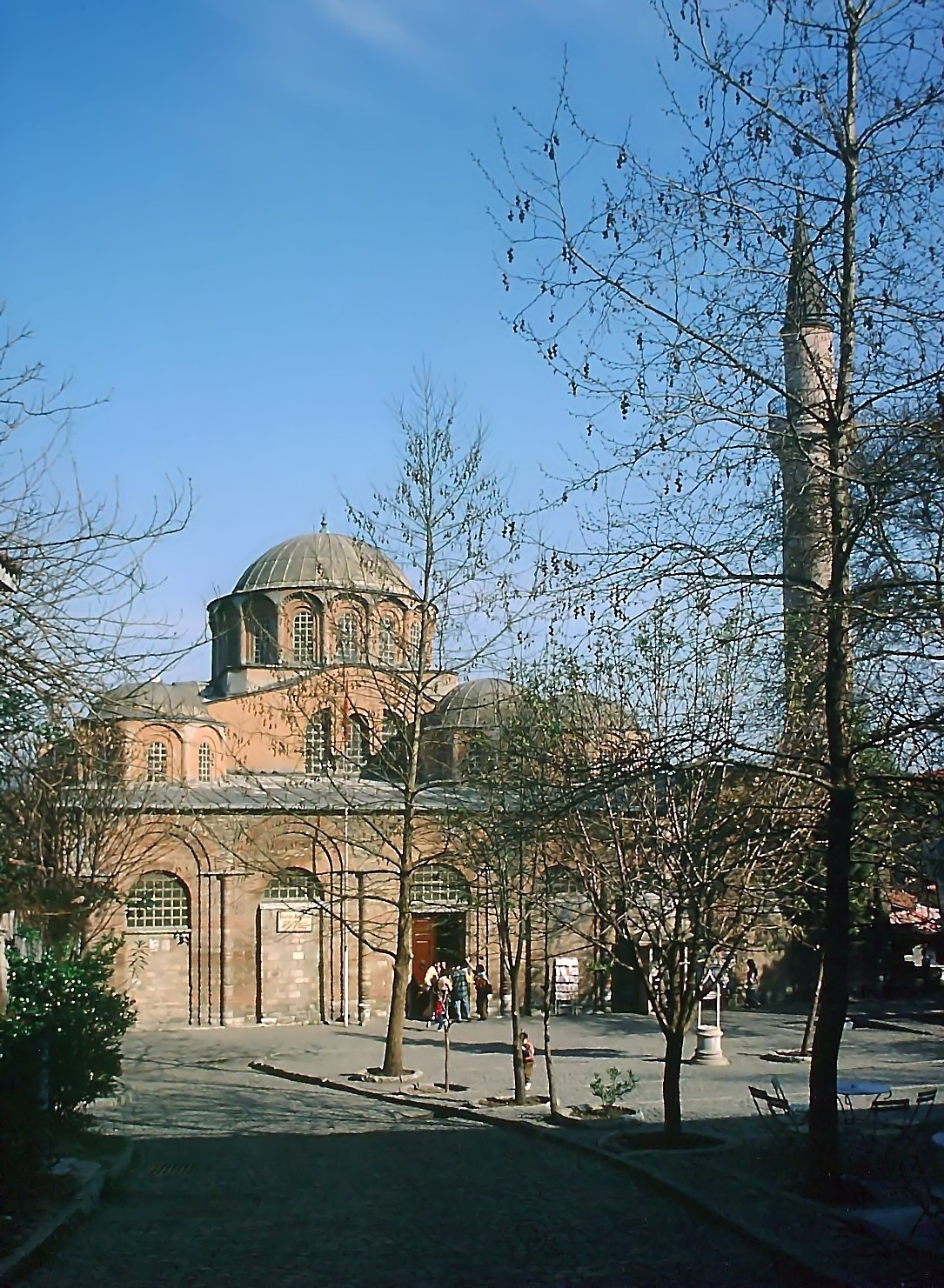
Front

The Chora Church or Kariye Mosque (Turkish: Kariye Camii; Ottoman Turkish: قعريه جامع شريفى) was a Byzantine church, now converted to a mosque (for the second time), in the Edirnekapı neighborhood of Fatih district, Istanbul, Turkey. It is famous for its outstanding Late Byzantine mosaics and frescos.

In the 16th century, during the Ottoman era, it was converted into a mosque; it became a museum in 1945, and was turned back into a mosque in 2020 by President Recep Tayyip Erdoğan. The interior is covered with some of the finest surviving Byzantine Christian mosaics and frescoes, which were protected and left in plain sight during Muslim worship throughout much of the Ottoman era. They were restored after the building was secularized and turned into a museum.

The church is located in the western Fatih district of Istanbul. It stands on sedimentary layers and anthropogenic infills on a slope descending towards the north. It is oriented east-west, as are typical Byzantine churches throughout the city.

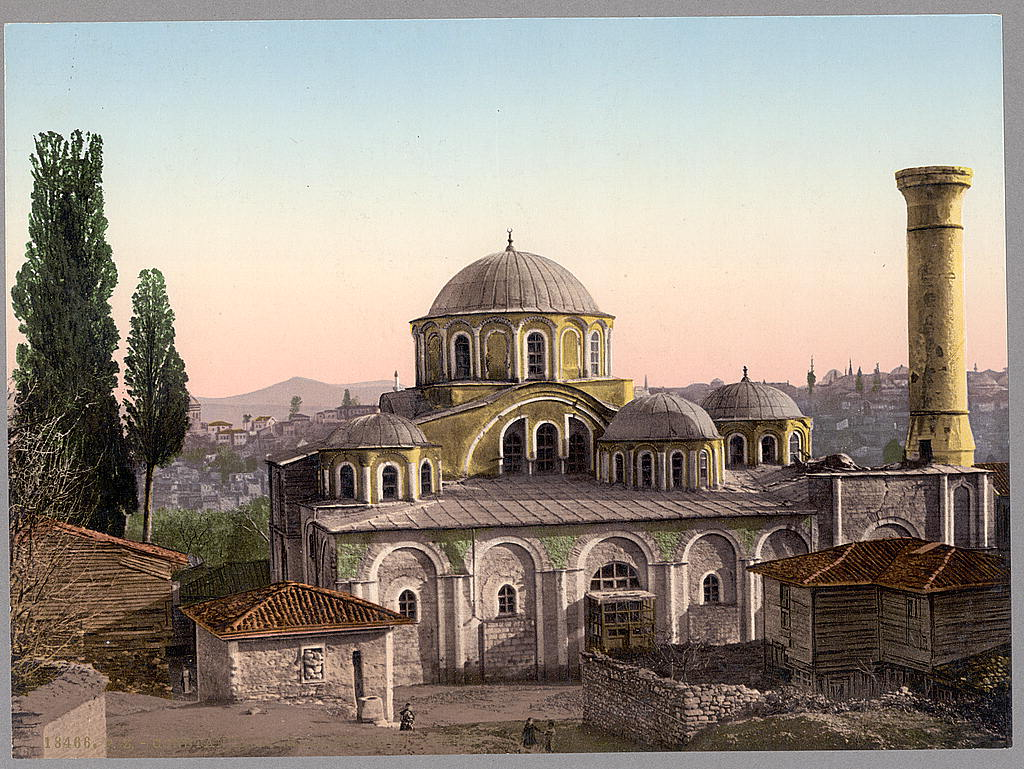
The Chora Church/Mosque, c. 1900

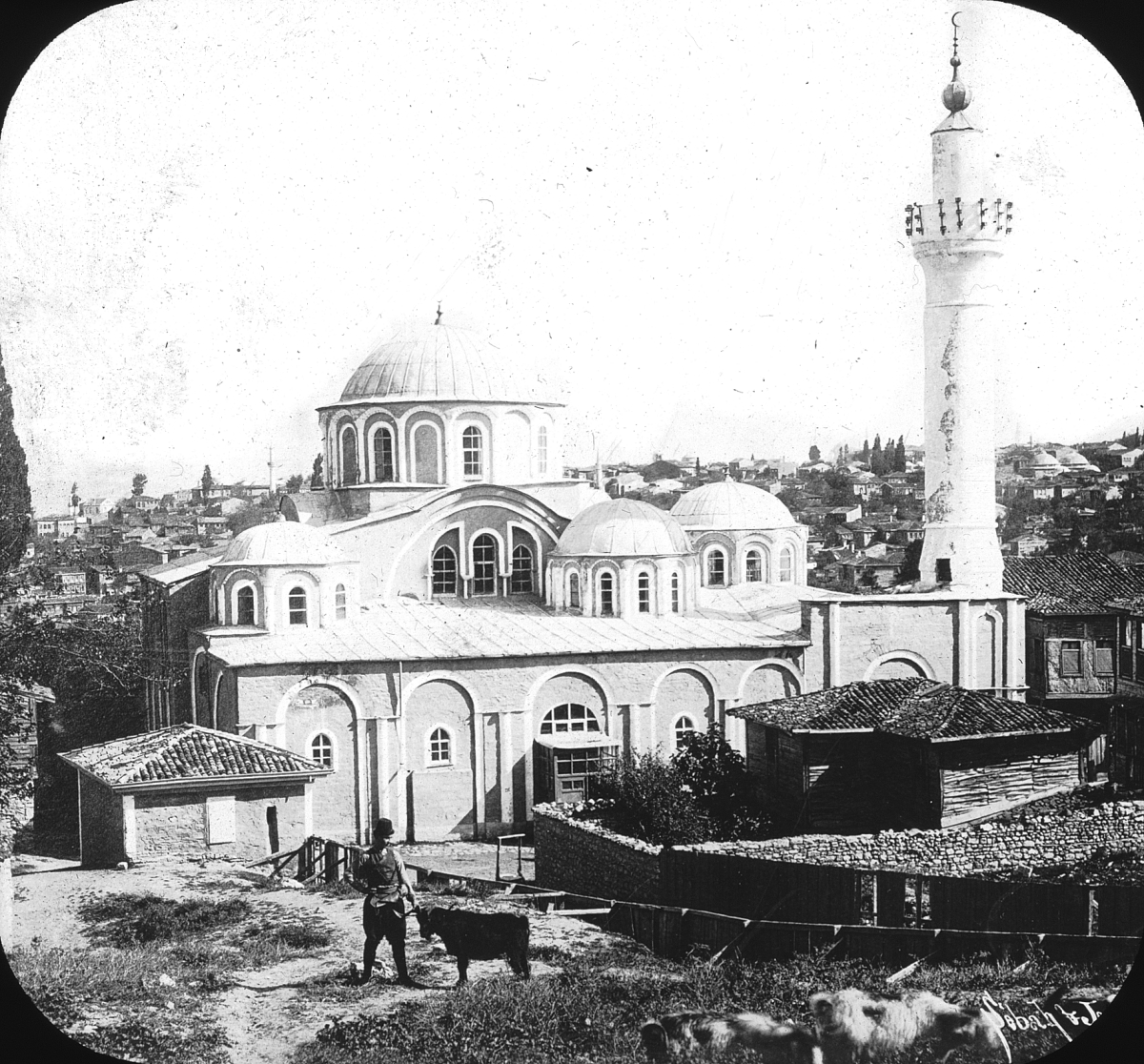
Chora Church/Mosque, Istanbul, Turkey, 1903 survey

== History ==
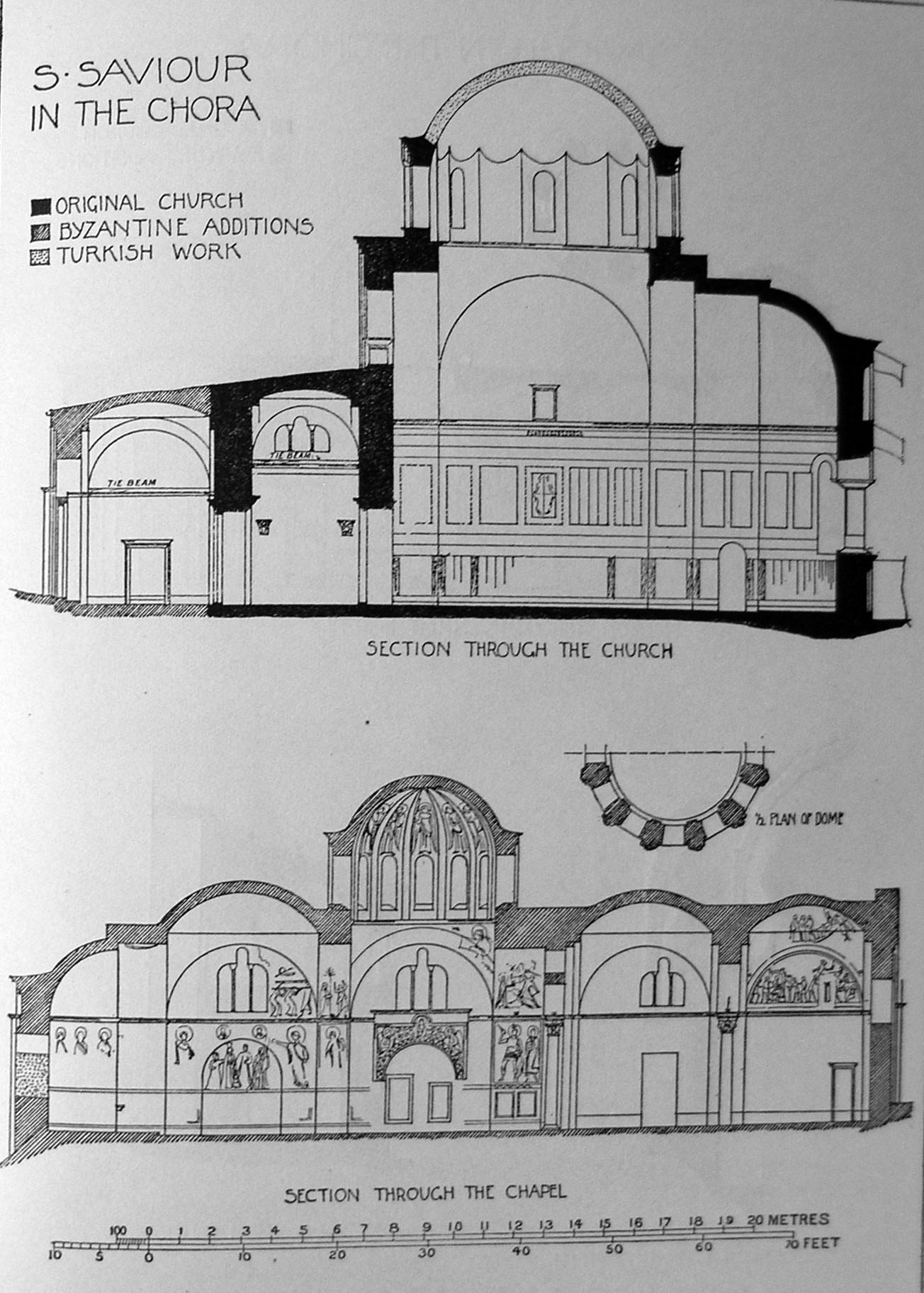
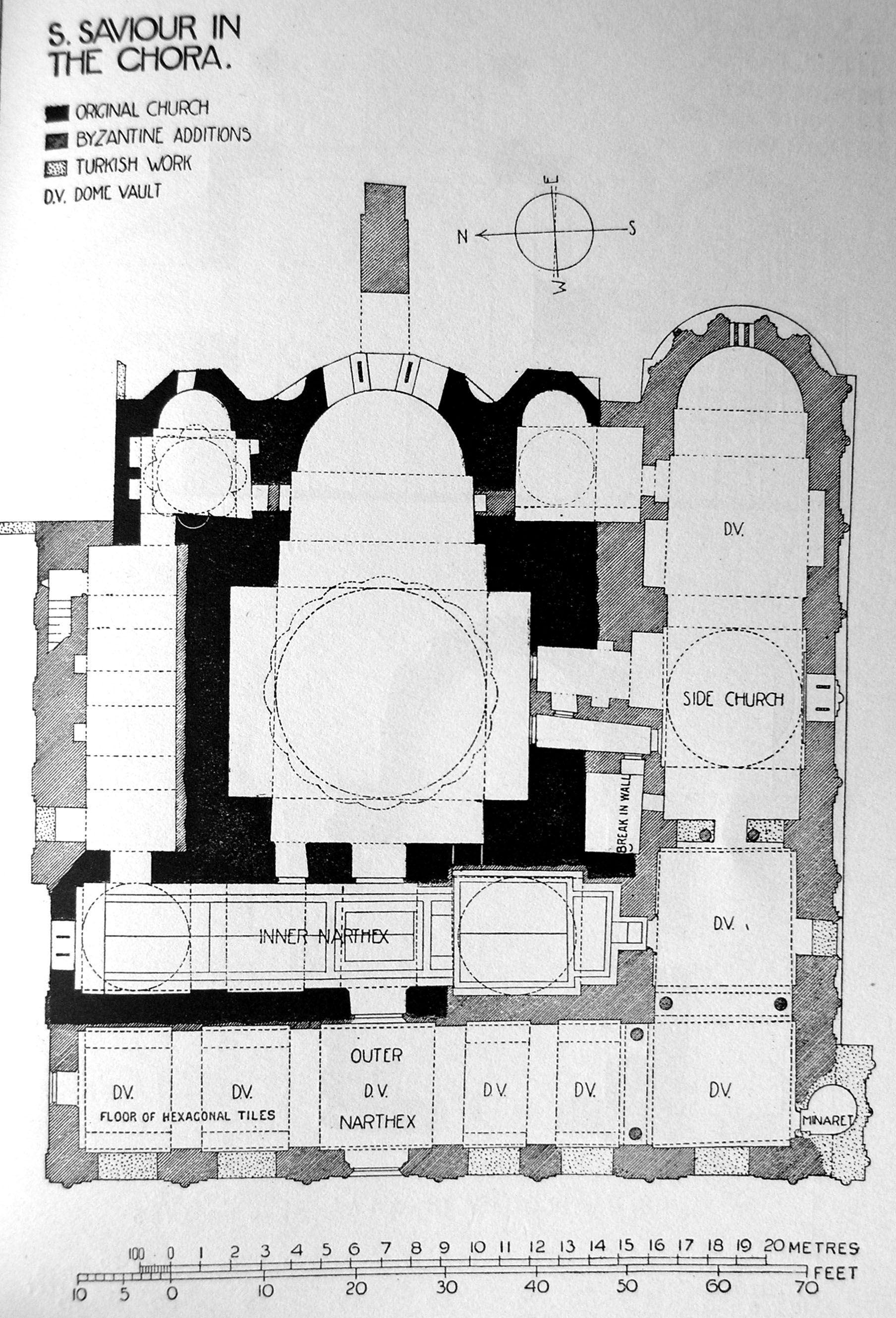
Sections and ground plan

=== First phase (4th century) ===
The Chora Church was originally built in the early 4th century as part of a monastery complex outside the city walls of Constantinople erected by Constantine the Great, to the south of the Golden Horn. However, when Theodosius II's Praetorian prefect Anthemius built the formidable Theodosian walls in 413–414, the church became incorporated within the city's defences, but retained the name Chora (for the presumed symbolism of the name see below).

=== Second phase (11th century) ===
The majority of the fabric of the current building dates from 1077–1081, when Maria Doukaina, the mother-in-law of Alexius I Comnenus, rebuilt the Chora Church as an inscribed cross or quincunx: a popular architectural style of the time. Early in the 12th century, the church suffered a partial collapse, perhaps due to an earthquake.

=== Third phase: new decoration (14th century) ===
The church was rebuilt by Isaac Comnenus, Alexius's third son. However, it was only after the third phase of building, two centuries after, that the church as it stands today was completed. The powerful Byzantine statesman Theodore Metochites endowed the church with many of its fine mosaics and frescoes. Theodore's impressive decoration of the interior was carried out between circa 1310 and 1317. The mosaic work is the finest example of the Palaeologian Renaissance. The artists remain unknown. A renowned classical scholar as well as statesman, Theodore donated his personal library to the Chora monastery, as well. Later on, between 1315 and 1321, Theodore Metochites, the Grand Logothete of the Treasury, commissioned the construction of the funerary chapel, outer buttress supports, and the narthexes. In 1328, Theodore was sent into exile by the usurper Andronicus III Palaeologus. However, he was allowed to return to the city two years later, and lived out the last two years of his life as a monk in his Chora Church.

=== Until the Conquest of Constantinople ===
In the late 13th and early 14th centuries, the monastery was home to the scholar Maximus Planudes, who was responsible for the restoration and reintroduction of Ptolemy's Geography to the Byzantines and, ultimately, to Renaissance Italy. During the last siege of Constantinople in 1453, the Icon of the Theotokos Hodegetria, considered the protector of the City, was brought to Chora in order to assist the defenders against the assault of the Ottomans.

=== Kariye Mosque (c. 1500–1945) ===
Around fifty years after the fall of the city to the Ottomans, Hadım Ali Pasha, the Grand Vizier of Sultan Bayezid II, ordered the Chora Church to be converted into a mosque — Kariye Camii. The word Kariye is derived from the Greek name Chora. The architectural modifications were kept minimal with minor whitewashing and the addition of a brick minaret and mihrab. None altered the spatial organisation of the church. Ottoman records indicate maintenance rather than renovation. Due to the prohibition against iconic images in Islam, the mosaics and frescoes were covered by a layer of plaster. This and frequent earthquakes in the region have taken their toll on the artwork. Additionally, the intervention efforts of the 19th century, led by Evkaf Nezareti, flattened the original domed roof profile, and masked the Late Byzantine silhouette.

=== Museum, art restoration (1945–2020) ===
In 1945 the site was secularized and designated a museum via Cabinet Decree, reflecting early Republican efforts to position Byzantine monuments as universal patrimony. In 1945, the building was designated a museum by the Turkish government. In 1948, the American scholars Thomas Whittemore and Paul A. Underwood, from the Byzantine Institute of America and the Dumbarton Oaks Center for Byzantine Studies, sponsored a restoration program. From that time on, the building ceased to be a functioning mosque. In 1958, it was opened to the public as a museum, Kariye Müzesi.

=== Reconversion to a mosque (2020–2024) ===
In 2005, the Association of Permanent Foundations and Service to Historical Artifacts and Environment filed a lawsuit to challenge the status of the Chora Church as a museum. In November 2019, the Turkish Council of State, Turkey's highest administrative court, ordered that it was to be reconverted to a mosque. In August 2020, its status changed to a mosque.

The move to convert Chora Church into a mosque was condemned by the Greek Foreign Ministry and by Greek Orthodox and Protestant Christians. This led to a sharp rebuke by Turkey.

On Friday, 30 October 2020, Muslim prayers were held for the first time after 72 years.

The building was opened for Muslim worship on 6 May 2024.

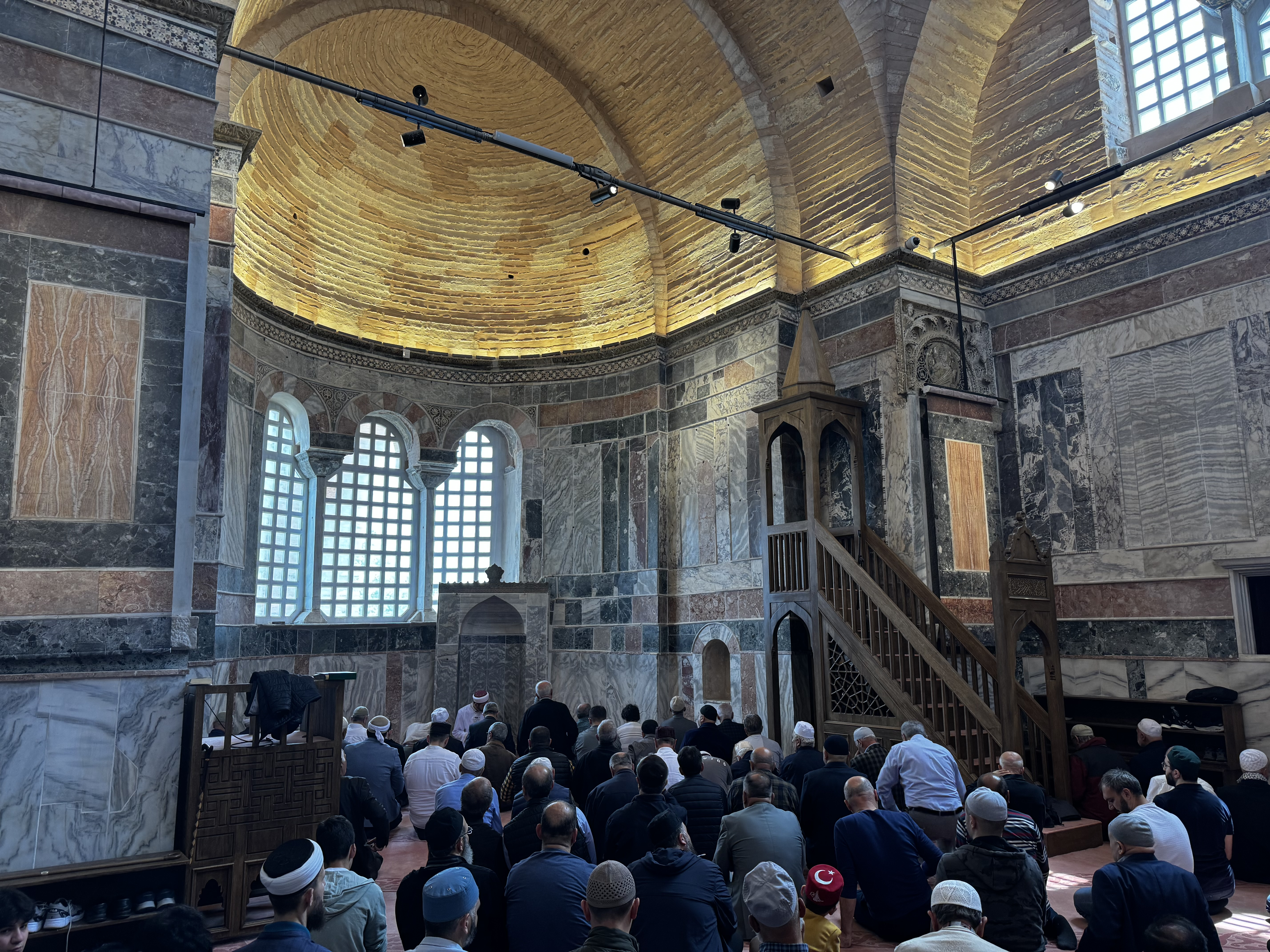
Muslim prayers during the Zuhr prayer time

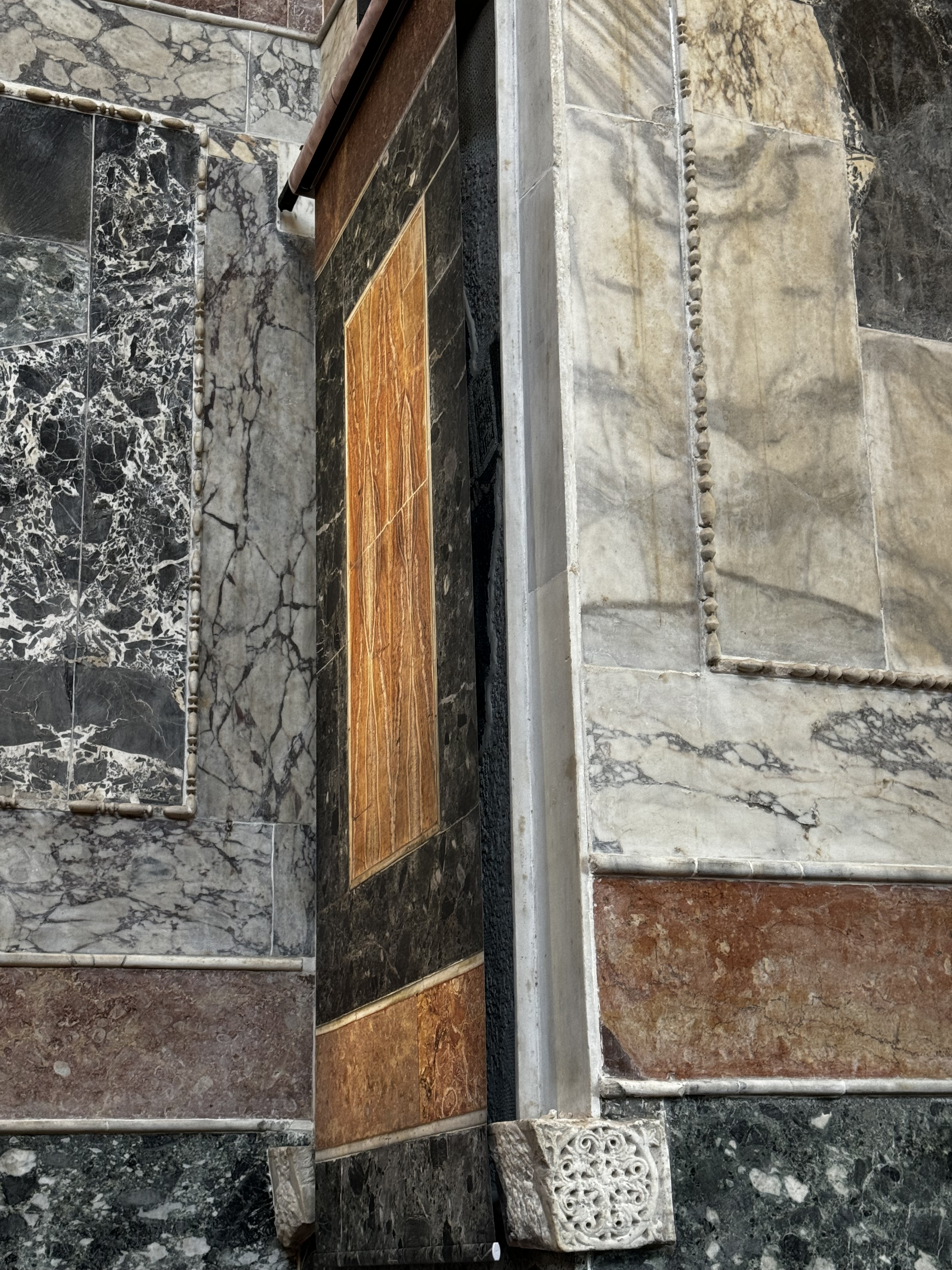
Covered mosaics with curtains

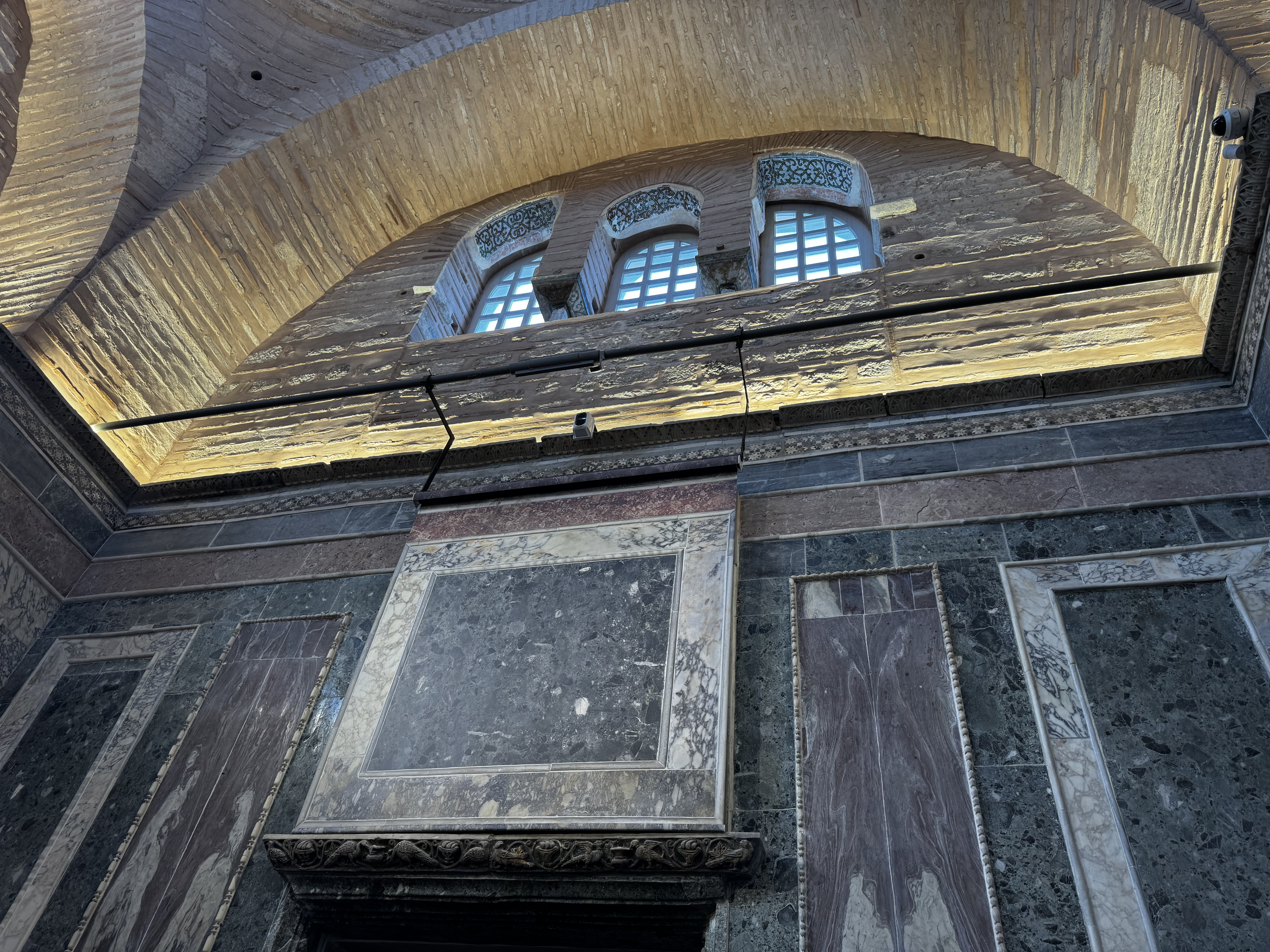
Covered mosaics with curtains

== Legal framework ==
Kariye Mosque is situated within the Historic Areas of Istanbul, inscribed on the UNESCO World Heritage List since 1985. It falls under the protection of the 1972 UNESCO World Heritage Convention, where State Party reporting, conservation planning, and risk monitoring under the World Heritage Centre are mandated. The site is registered as a 1st degree archaeological and architectural heritage asset and is protected under Law No. 2863 on the Conservation of Cultural and Natural Properties.

The conversion to a museum in 1945, by the Cabinet Decree, was annulled. Regardless of the lawsuit opened by the Association of Permanent Foundations and Service to Historical Artifacts and Environment in 2005, for its right to be a museum, in 2019 by the Council of State ruling based on religious foundations. In 2020, the Presidential Decree transferred the rights to the Presidency of Religious Affairs.

== Interior ==
The Chora Church is not as large as some of the other surviving Byzantine churches of Istanbul (it covers 742.5 m²) but it is unique among them, because of its almost completely still-extant internal decoration. The building is divided into three main areas: the entrance hall or narthex, the main body of the church or naos (nave), and the side chapel or parecclesion. The building has six domes: two above the esonarthex, one above the parecclesion and three above the naos.

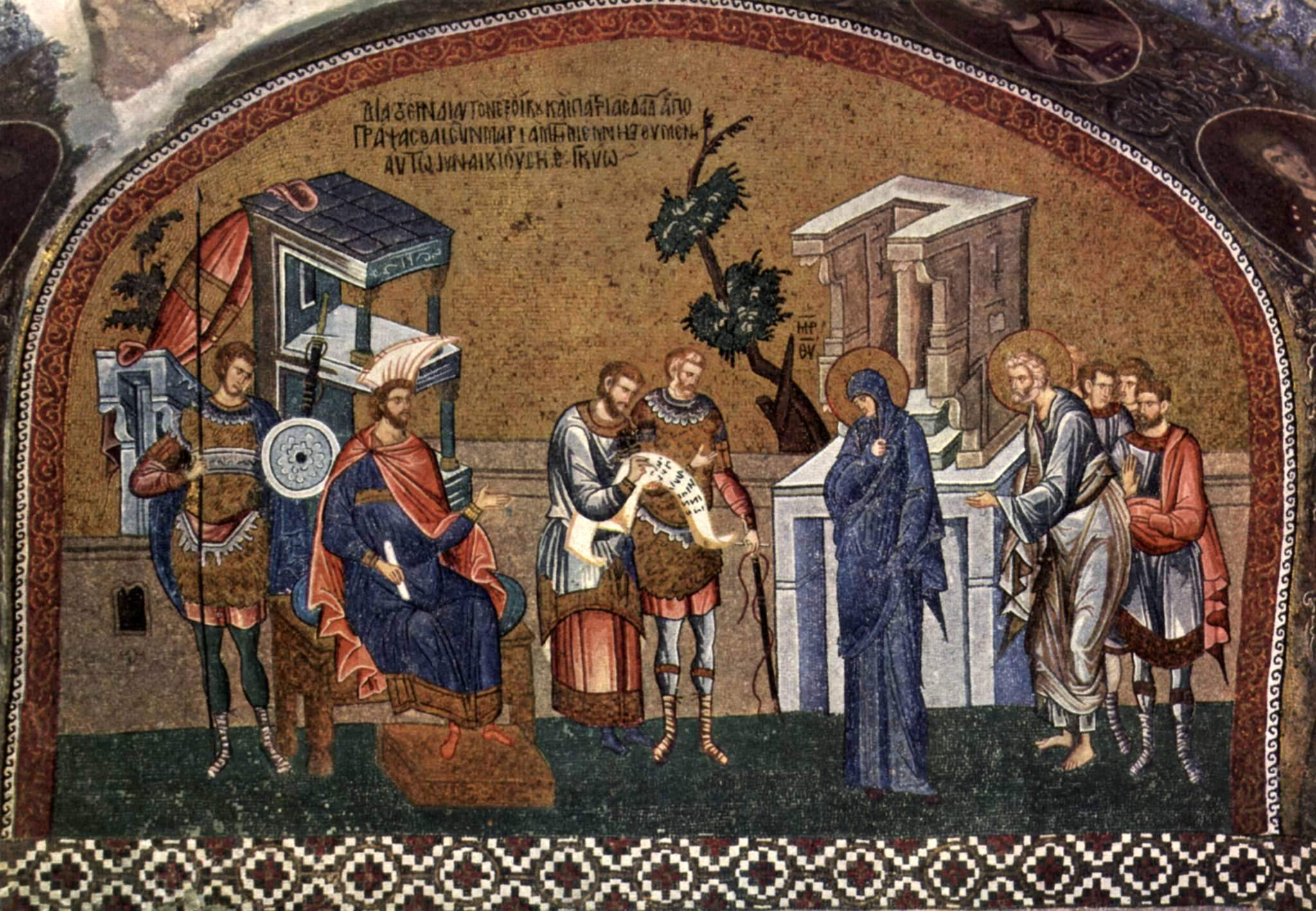
Mosaic of the enrollment for taxation before Governor Quirinius

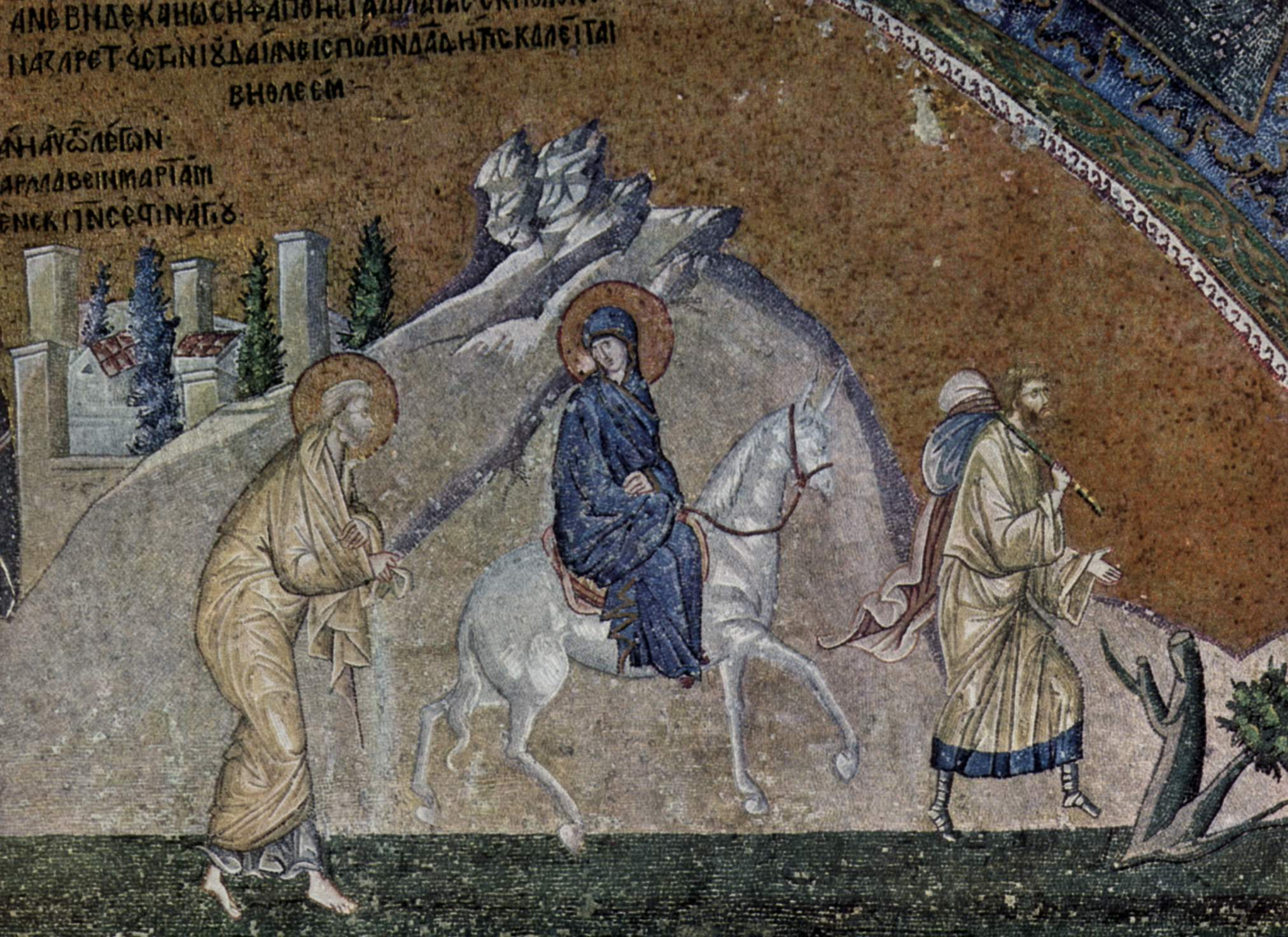
Mosaic of the journey to Bethlehem

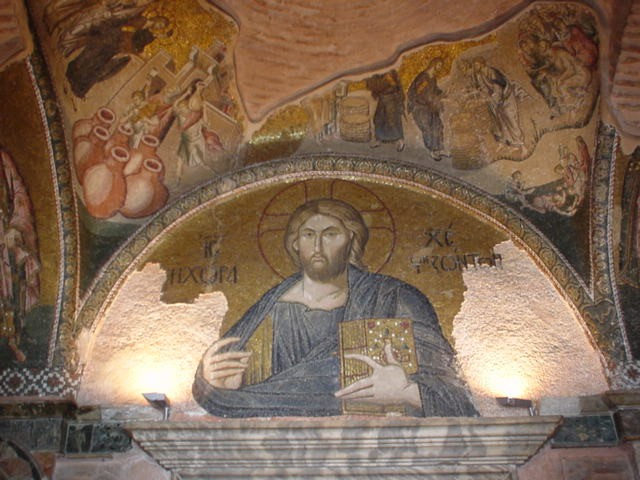
The mosaic in the lunette over the doorway to the esonarthex portrays Christ as “The Land of the Living”.

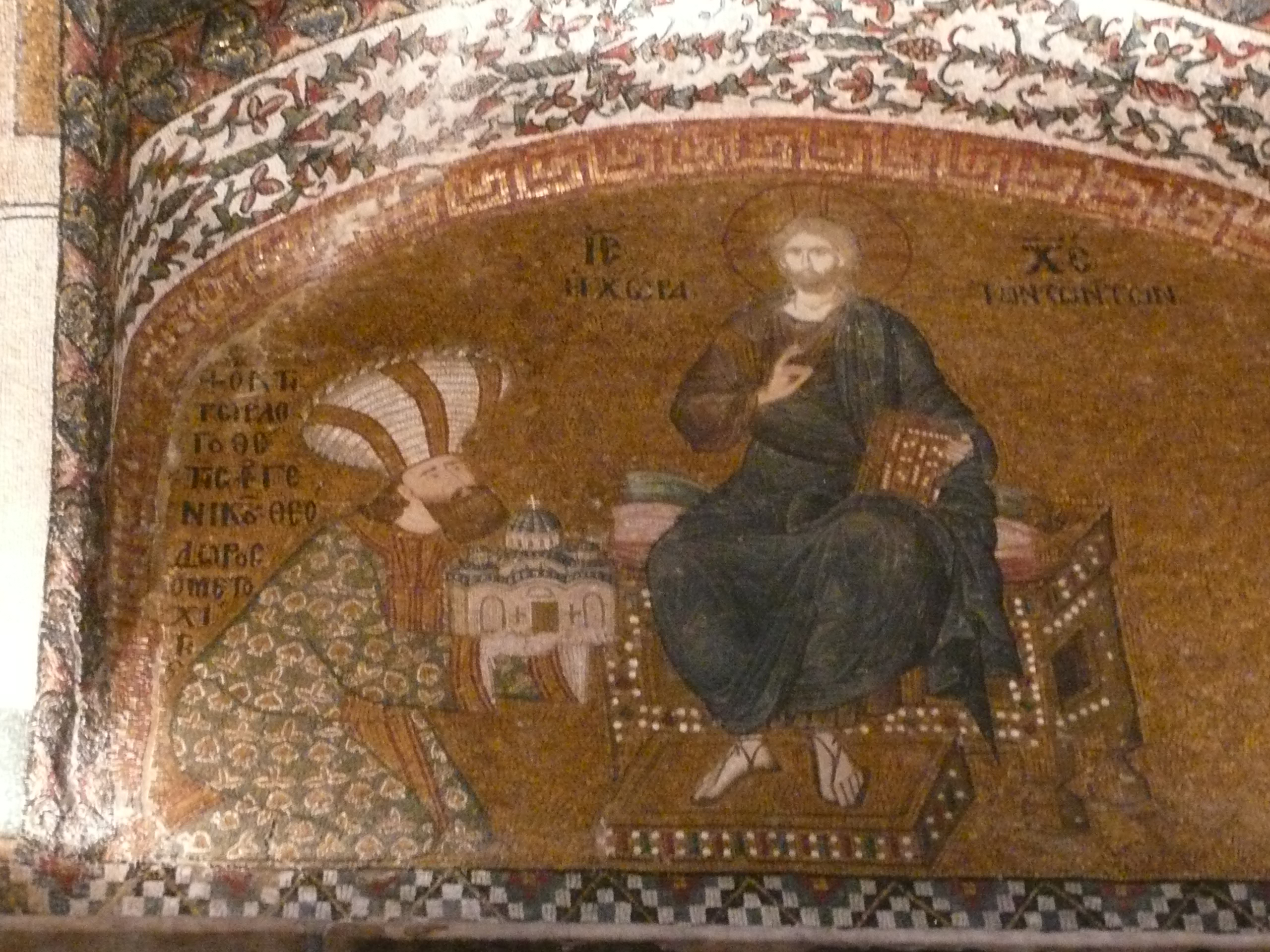
Mosaic of Christ enthroned with Theodore Metochites presenting a model of his church

=== Narthex ===
The main, west door of the Chora Church opens into the narthex. It divides north–south into the outer, or exonarthex and the inner, or esonarthex.

==== Exonarthex ====
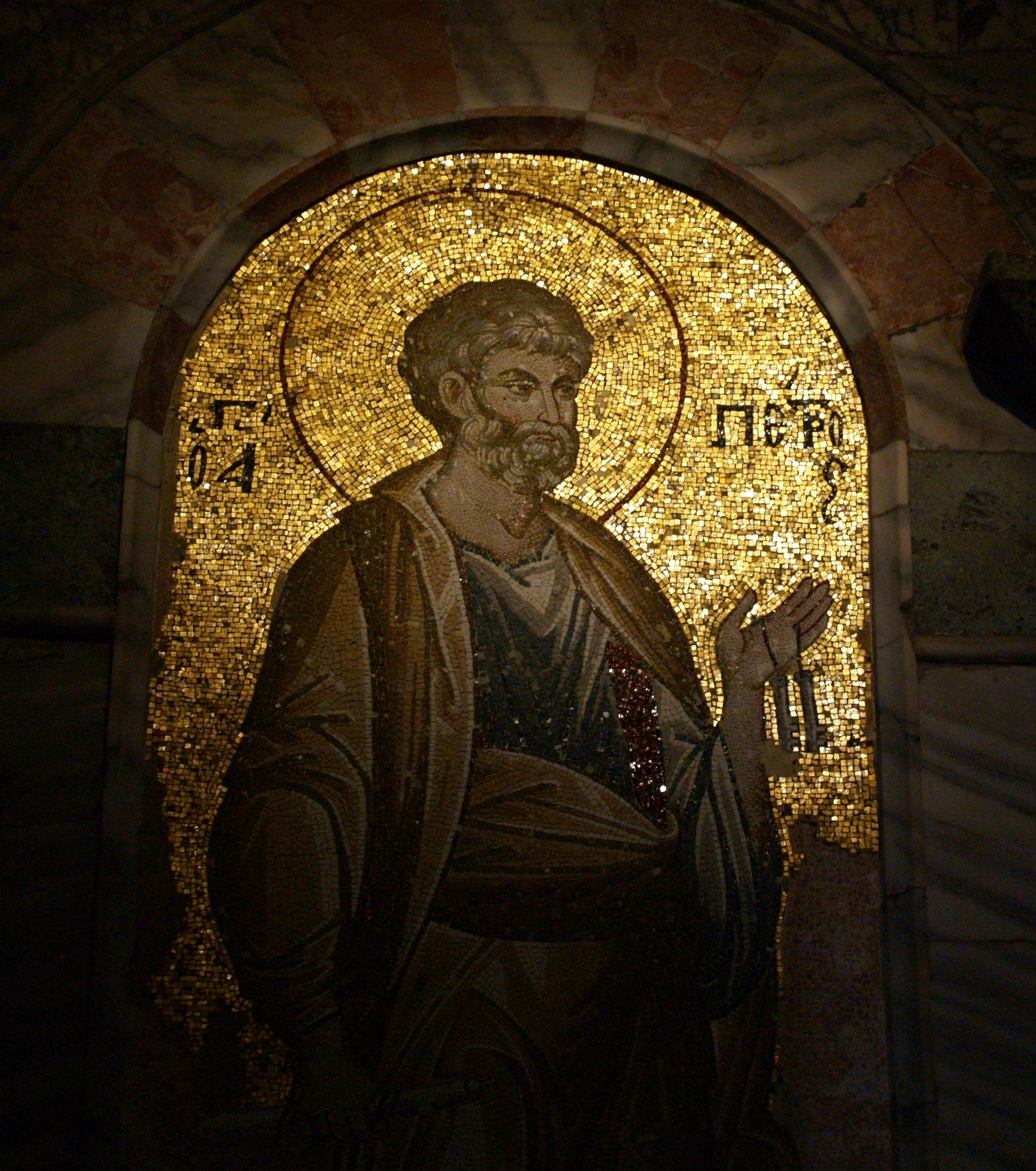
Mosaic of Saint Peter

The exonarthex (or outer narthex) is the first part of the church that one enters. It is a transverse corridor, 4 m wide and 23 m long, which is partially open on its eastern length into the parallel esonarthex. The southern end of the exonarthex opens out through the esonarthex, forming a western antechamber to the parecclesion. The mosaics that decorate the exonarthex include:

1. Joseph's dream and the journey to Bethlehem
2. The enrollment for taxation
3. The Nativity
4. The journey of the Magi
5. The inquiry of King Herod;
6. The flight into Egypt
7. Two frescoes of the massacres ordered by King Herod
8. Mothers mourning their children
9. The flight of Elizabeth, mother of John the Baptist
10. Joseph dreaming, and the return of the Holy Family from Egypt to Nazareth
11. Christ taken to Jerusalem for the Passover
12. John the Baptist bearing witness to Christ
13. A miracle
14. Three more miracles
15. The Virgin and angels praying. This image faces the Christ Pantokrator lunette (#16 in this list), and Mary is labelled in Greek, “Mother of God, container (chora) of the uncontainable (achoritou).” This phrase both refers to the theological paradox of Christ's dual nature, as well as the name of the monastery, the Chora.
16. Christ Pantokrator (or "Almighty," this image is in the lunette over the doorway to the inner narthex, and depicts Christ blessing the viewer with his right hand, and holding a jeweled Gospel in his left.) The label plays on the monastery's name, the Chora, in its reference to Christ as the "land of the living." This phrase comes from Psalm 116:9, used in the Orthodox funeral service, also significant because of the addition of the funerary spaces under Metochites, who anticipated burial in this monastery.

==== Esonarthex ====
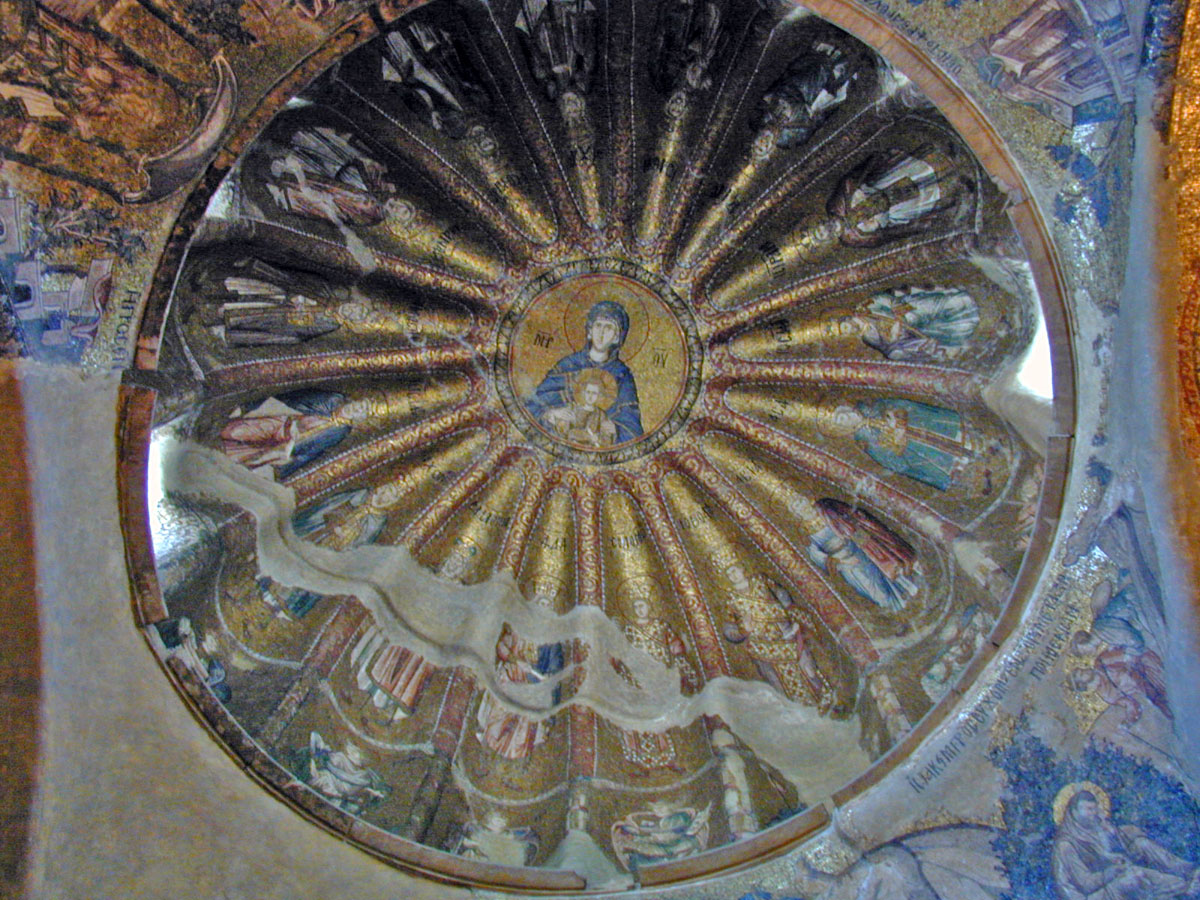
Mosaic of the Virgin and Child, north dome of the inner narthex

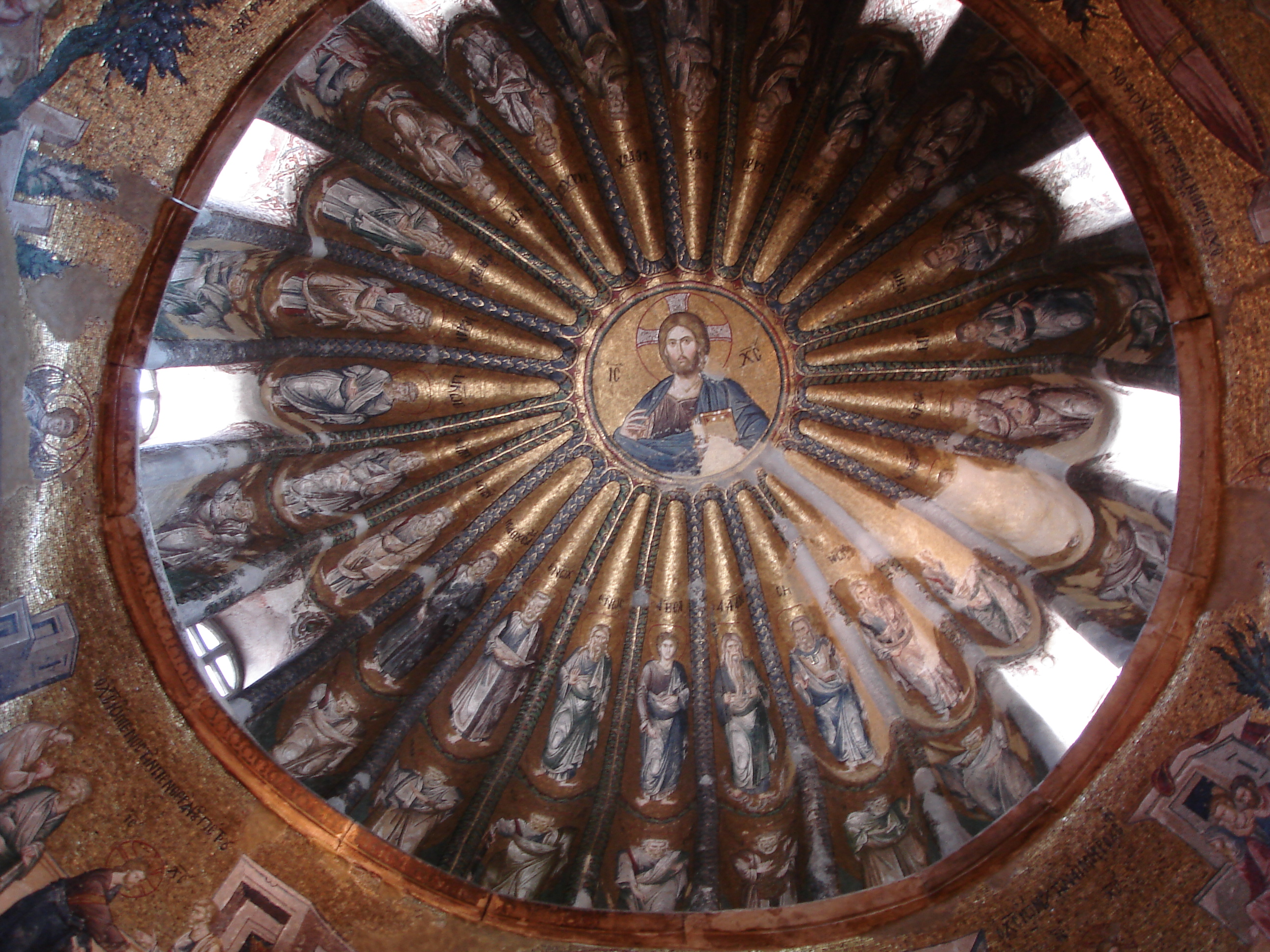
Mosaic of Christ Pantocrator, south dome of the inner narthex

The esonarthex (or inner narthex) is similar to the exonarthex, running parallel to it. Like the exonarthex, the esonarthex is 4 m wide, but it is slightly shorter, 18 m long. Its central, eastern door opens into the naos, while another door at the southern end of the esonarthex opens into the rectangular antechamber of the parecclesion. At its northern end, a door from the esonarthex leads into a broad west–east corridor that runs along the northern side of the naos and into the prothesis. The esonarthex has two "pumpkin" domes. The smaller is above the entrance to the northern corridor; the larger is midway between the entrances into the naos and the pareclession, and they continue the emphasis on imagery of the Virgin and Christ seen elsewhere in these mosaics.

1. Enthroned Christ with Theodore Metochites presenting a model of his church. This image depicts Theodore in the traditional visual formula indicating that he is the donor, for this fourteenth-century leader was responsible for renovating the twelfth-century church as well as adding the parecclesion.
2. Saint Peter
3. Saint Paul
4. A monumentally scaled mosaic of the Deesis: Christ and the Virgin Mary (without John the Baptist) with two earlier donors below, Isaac Komnenos and a nun labeled “Melanie, the Lady of the Mongols,” who may be the daughter of emperor Michael VIII (reigned 1261–82). The subject matter and large scale probably alludes to a similar scene in the south gallery of the Hagia Sophia, installed soon after the Latin occupation of Constantinople (1204–61) ended.
5. The genealogy of Christ
6. Religious and noble ancestors of Christ

The mosaics in the first three bays of the inner narthex give an account of the life of the Virgin, and those of her parents. Some of them are as follows:

1. The rejection of Joachim's offerings
2. The annunciation to Saint Anne: the angel of the Lord announcing to Anne that her prayer for a child has been heard
3. The meeting of Joachim and Anne
4. The birth of the Virgin
5. The first seven steps of the Virgin
6. The Virgin given affection by her parents, this scene is more typical of the late Byzantine era, when artists were more inclined to explore emotional and/or everyday themes than artists in the early or middle Byzantine periods.
7. The Virgin blessed by the priests
8. The presentation of the Virgin in the Temple
9. The Virgin receiving bread from an Angel
10. The Virgin receiving the skein of purple wool, as the priests decided to have the attendant maidens weave a veil for the Temple
11. Zechariah praying; when it was time for the Virgin to marry, the High Priest Zechariah called all the widowers together and placed their rods on the altar, praying for a sign showing to whom she should be given
12. The Virgin entrusted to Joseph;
13. Joseph taking the Virgin to his house;
14. The Annunciation to the Virgin at the well. This image, in which the young Mary awkwardly turns towards the approach of the archangel Gabriel, was adapted to the triangular space in which it was depicted. There is a strong emphasis on images of Christ and Mary in the exonarthex and esonarthex.
15. Joseph leaving the Virgin; Joseph had to leave for six months on business and when he returned the Virgin was pregnant, arousing his suspicion.

=== Naos ===
The central doors of the esonarthex lead into the main body of the church, the naos. The largest dome in the church (7.7 m in diameter) is above the centre of the naos. Two smaller domes flank the modest apse: the northern dome is over the prothesis, which is linked by a short passage to the bema; the southern dome is over the diaconicon, which is reached via the parecclesion. Only three mosaics survive in the Chora's naos:

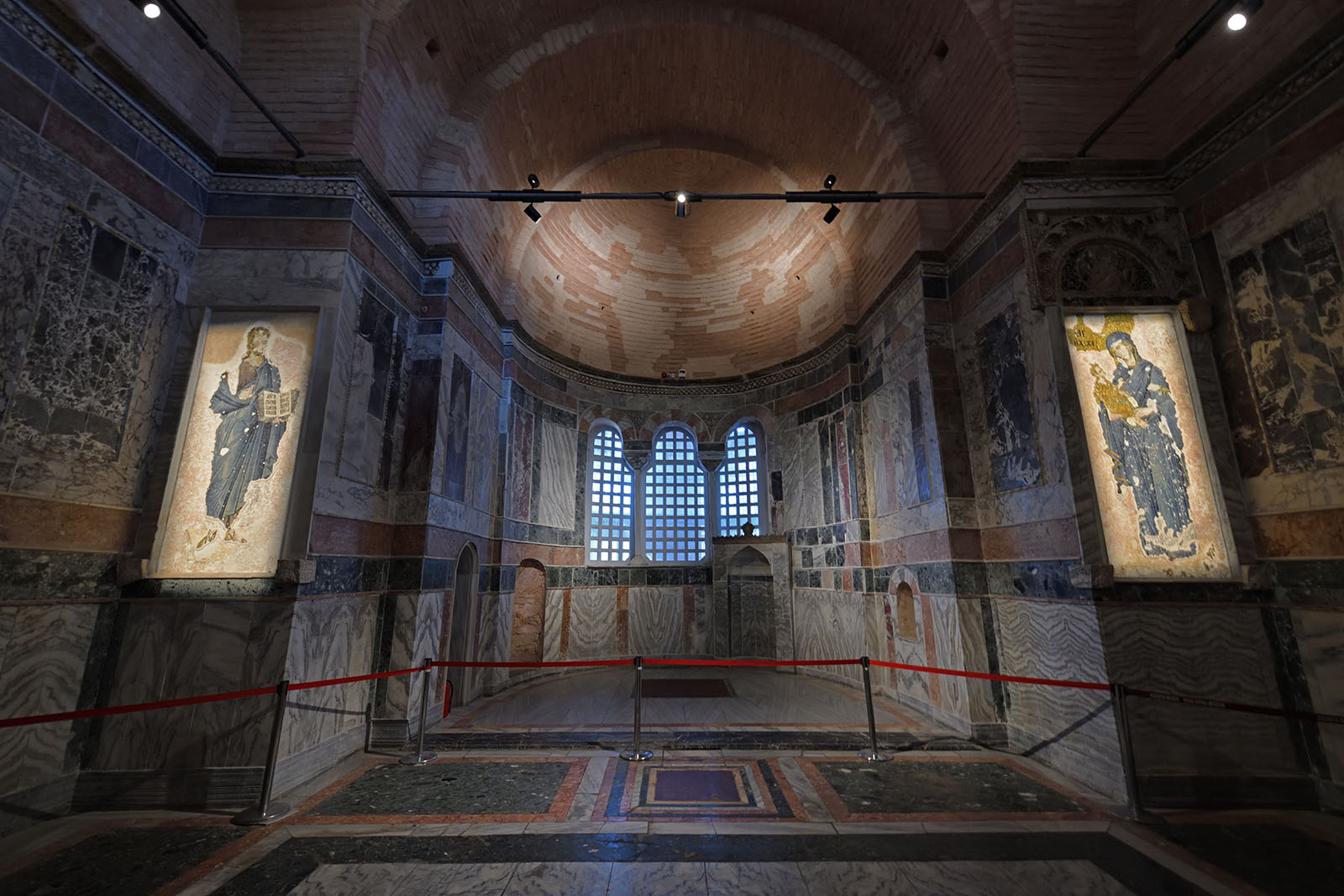
View from the naos toward the apse

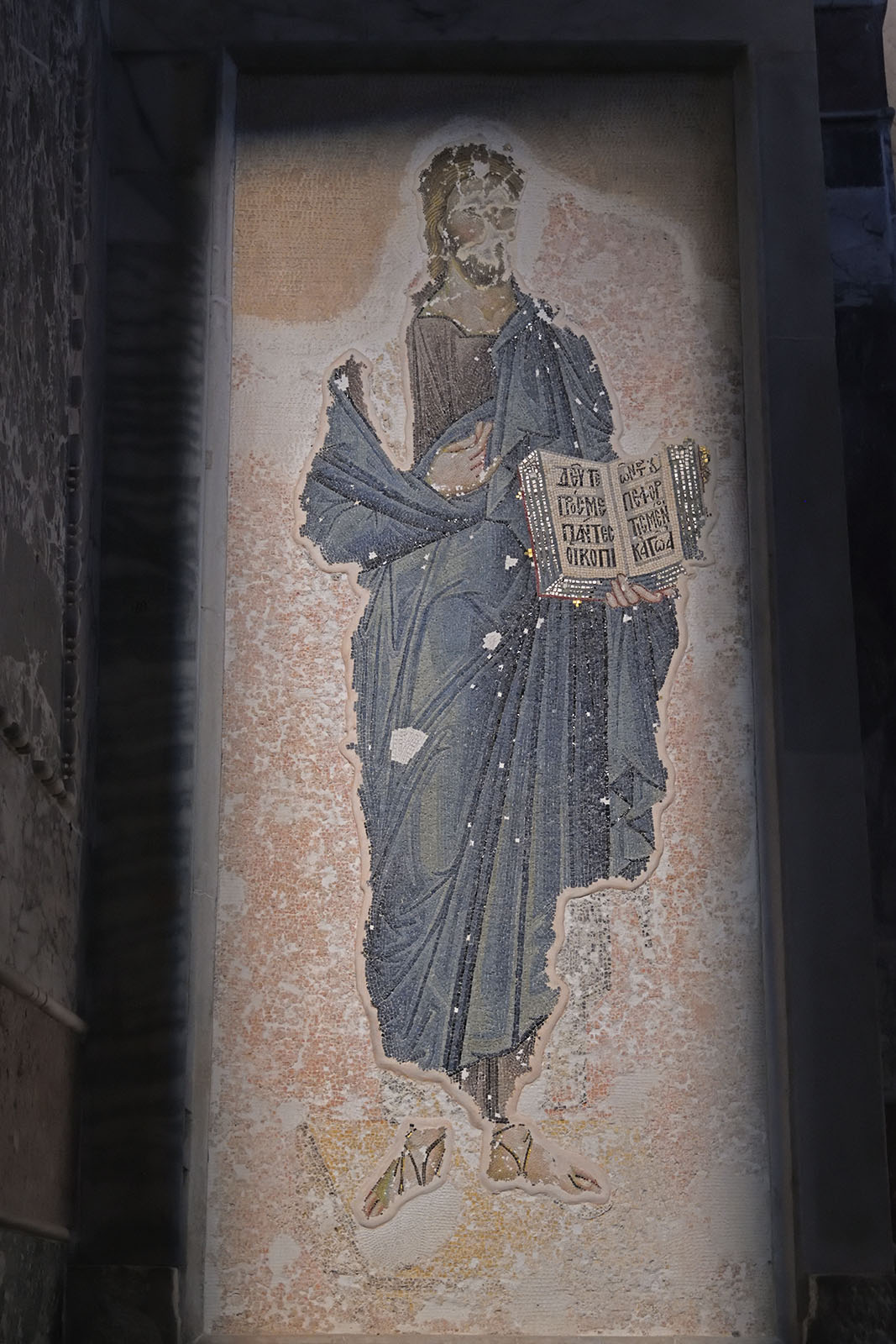
Christ

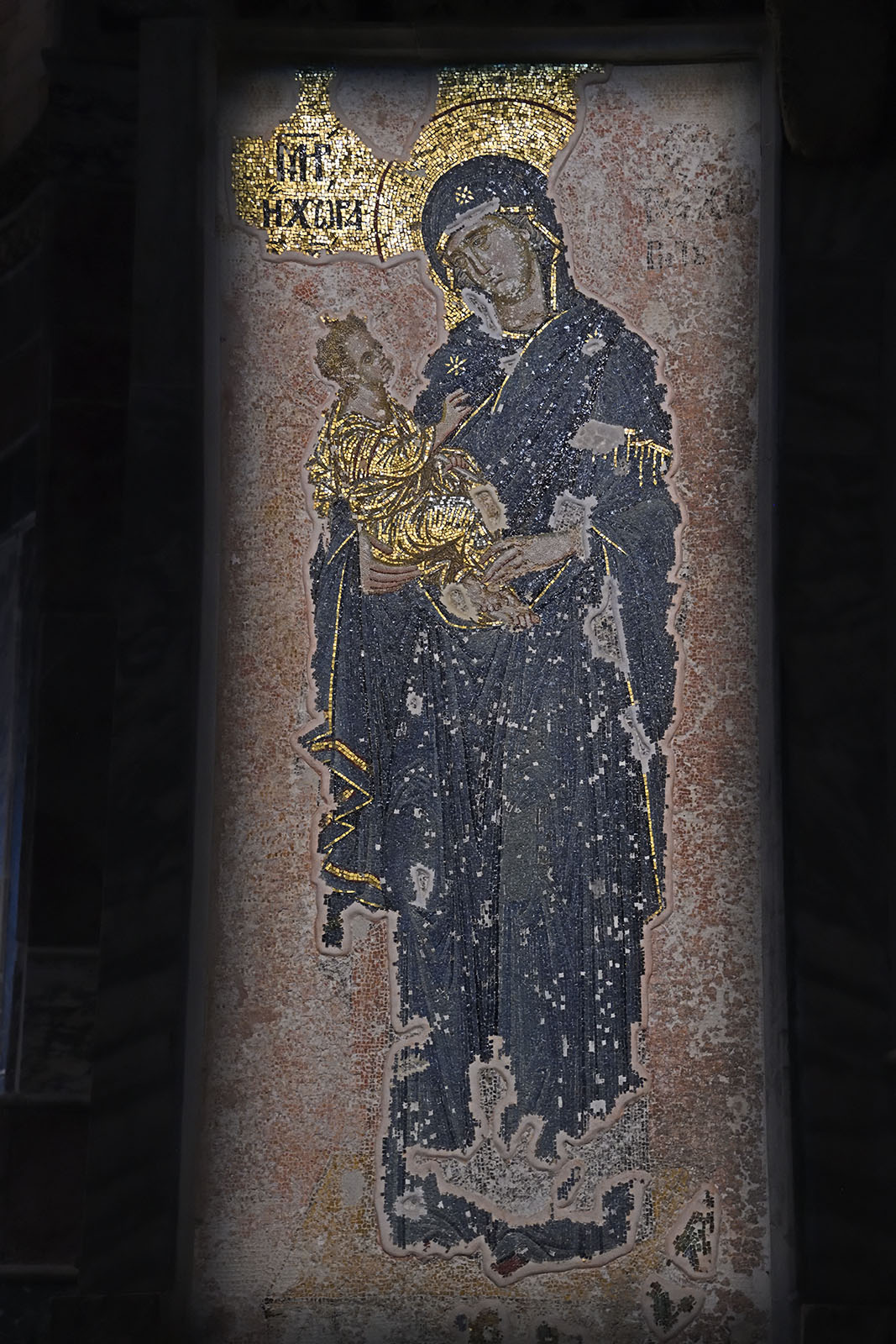
Virgin and Child

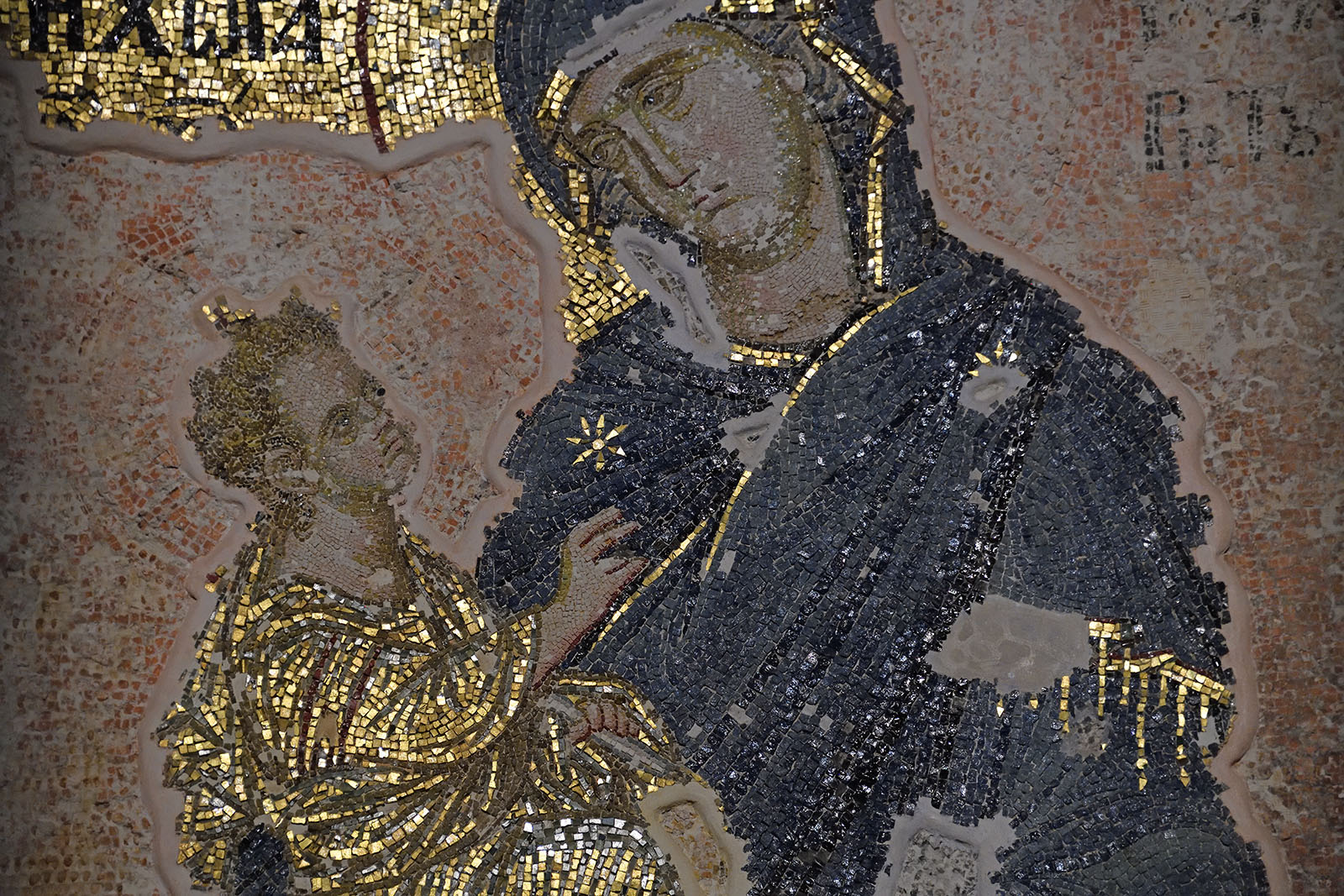
Virgin and Child (detail)

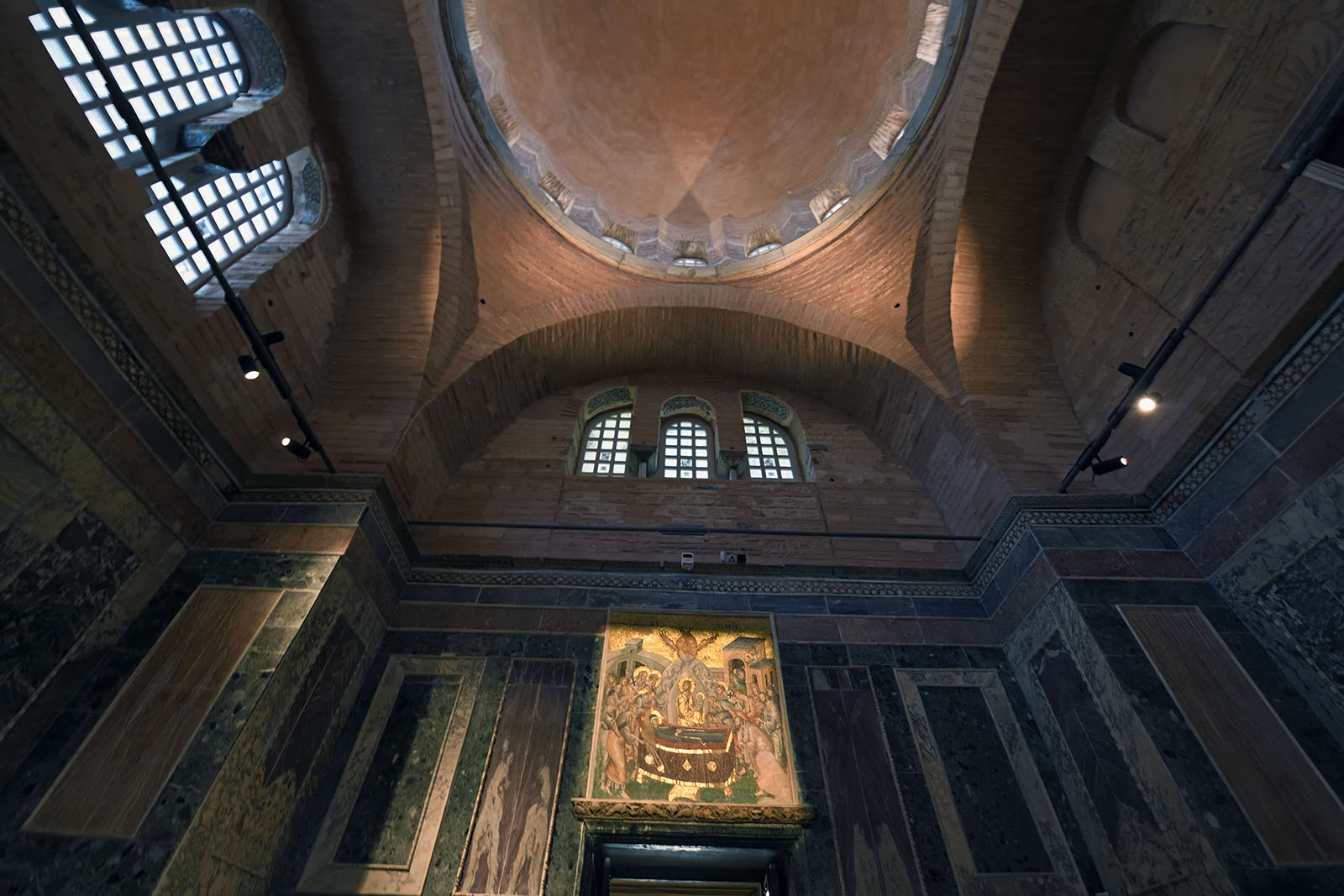
Position of the Koimesis mosaic

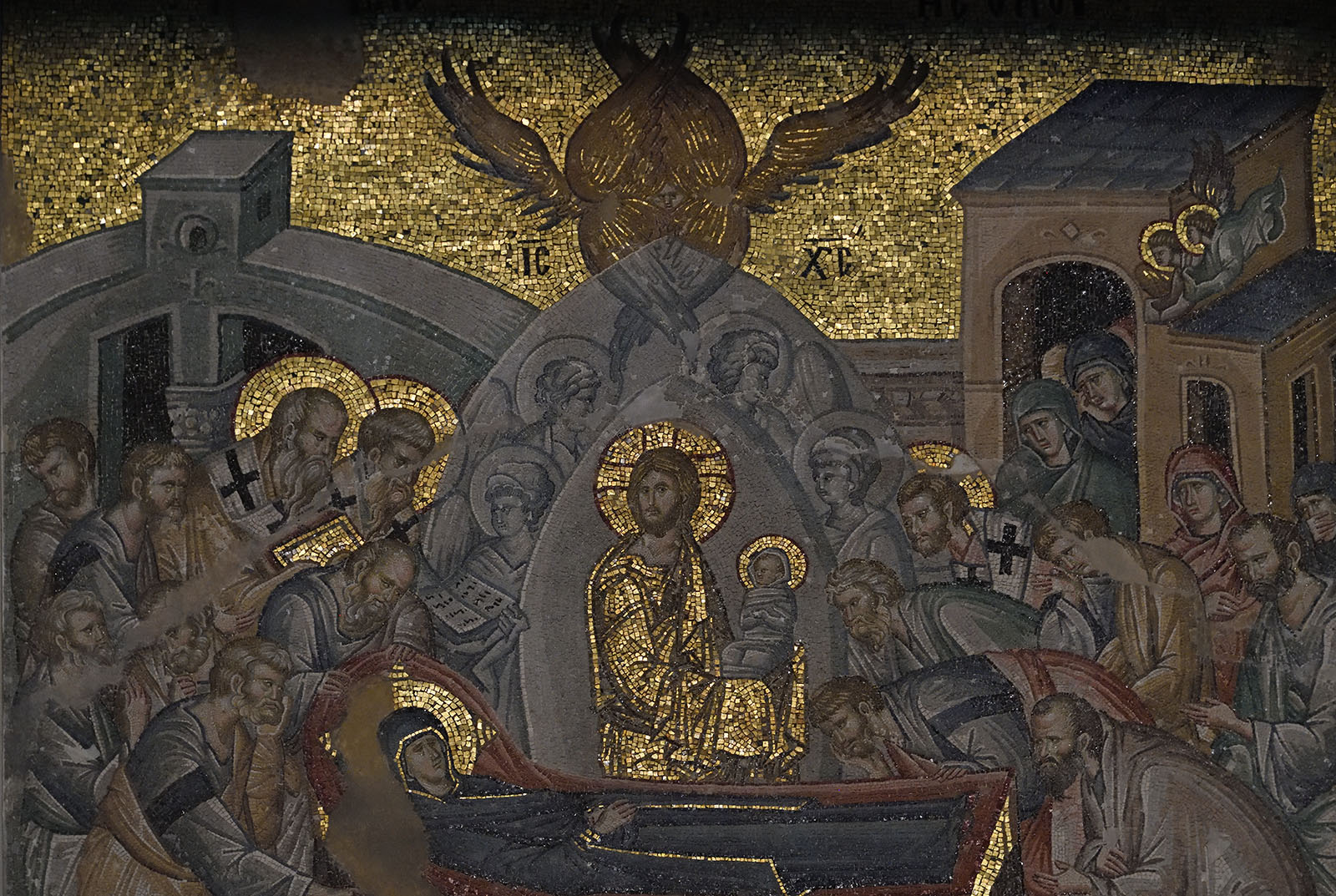
Koimesis (central part)

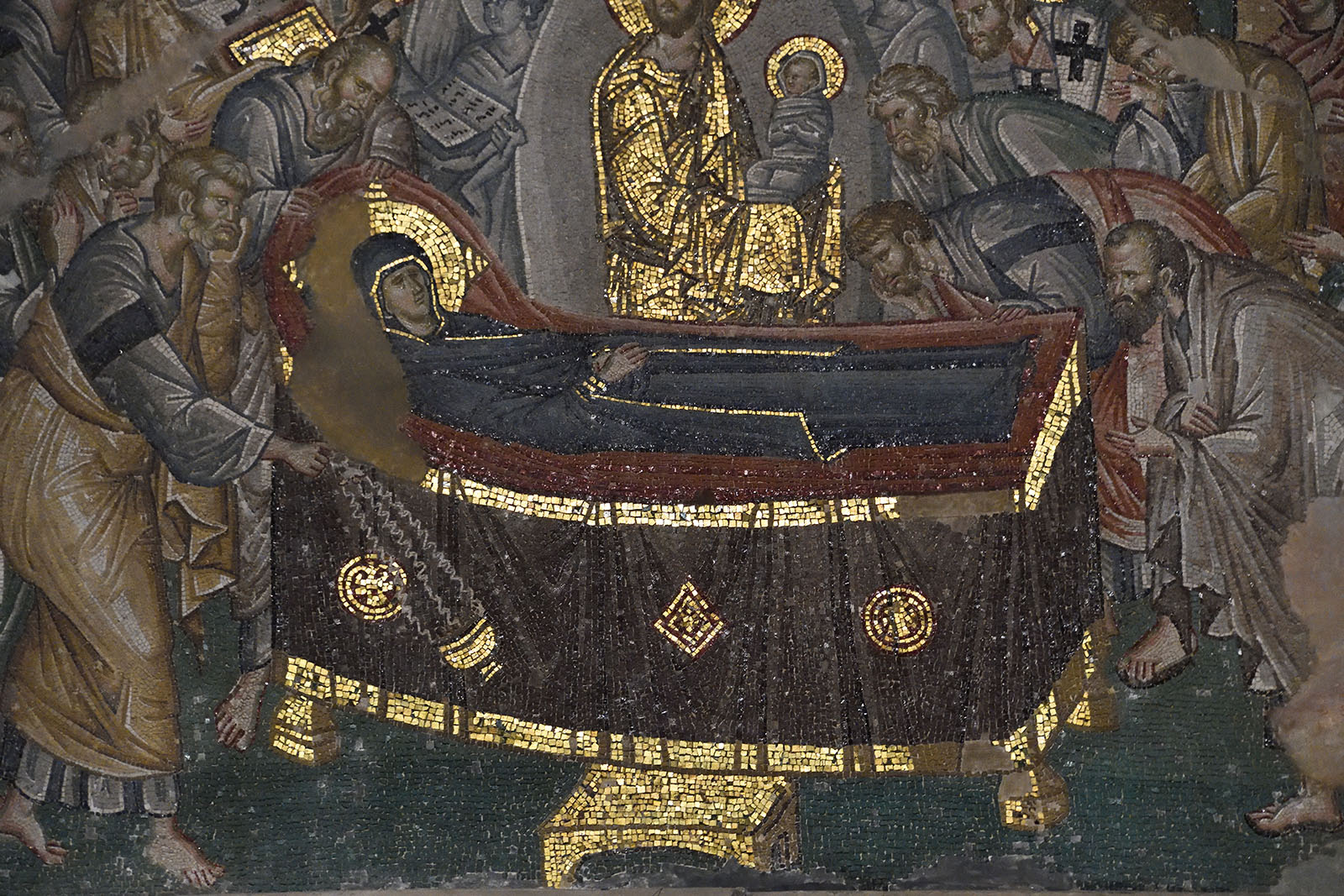
Koimesis (detail)

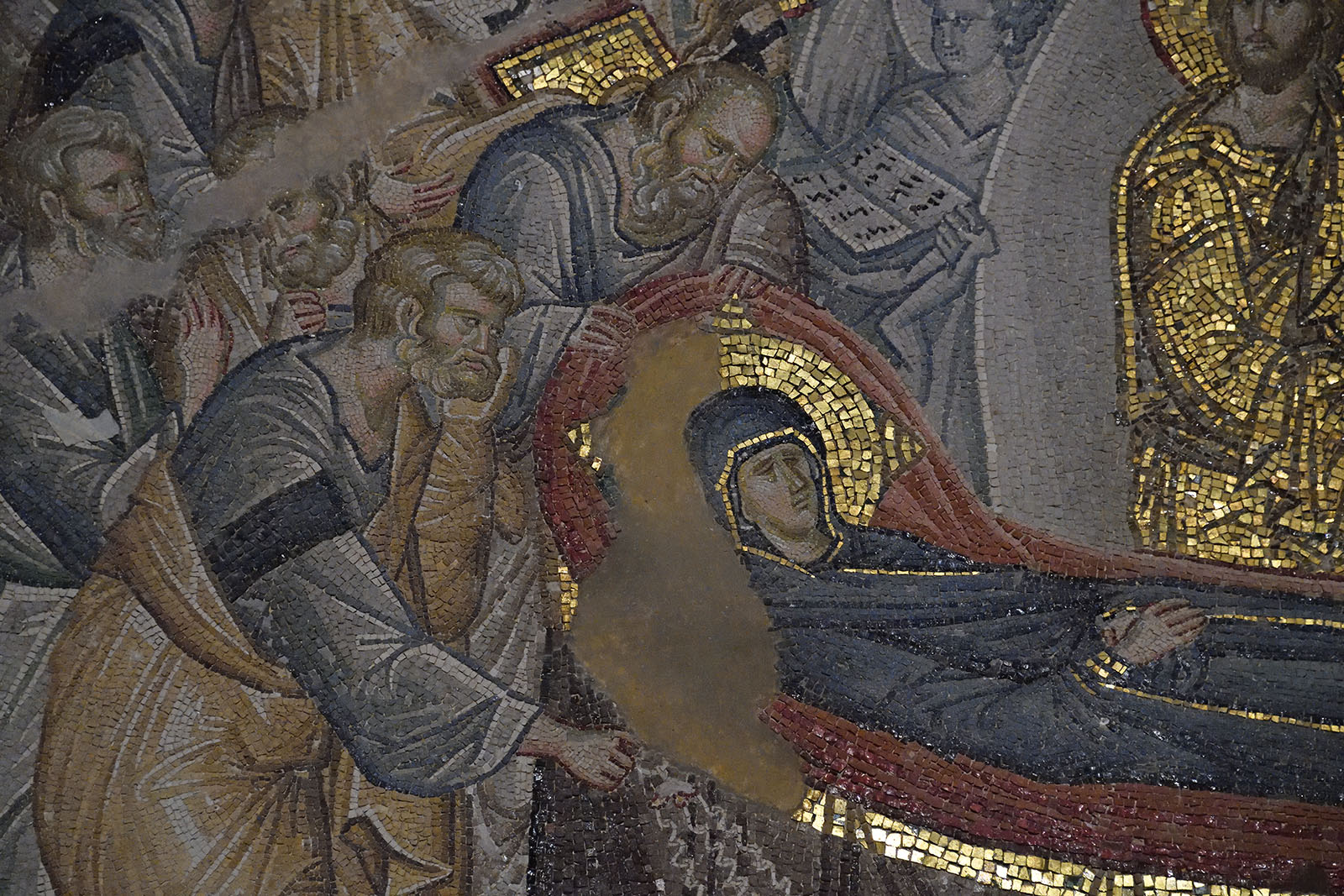
Koimesis (detail)
1. Koimesis (the Dormition of the Virgin; i.e. her last sleep before ascending to Heaven). Jesus is holding an infant, symbolic of Mary's soul.
2. Jesus Christ
3. Theotokos (the Virgin and Child), both the image of Christ (#2 in this list) and this mosaic of the Virgin originally were positioned as proskynetaria icons to flank the templon, the barrier which was in front of the sanctuary, though the templon no longer survives.

=== Parecclesion ===
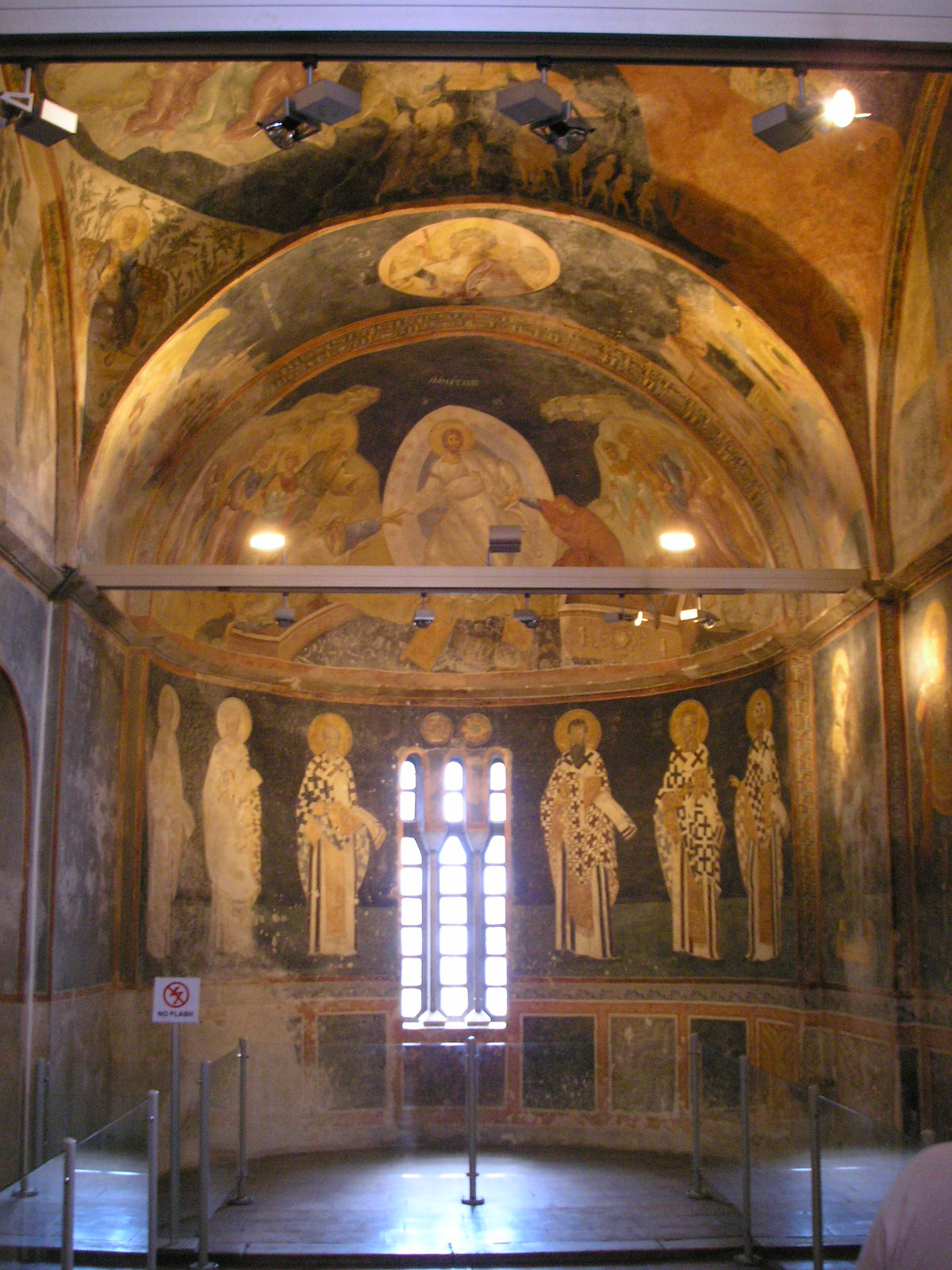
View into the parecclesion

To the right of the esonarthex, doors open into the side chapel, or parecclesion. The parecclesion was used as a mortuary chapel for family burials and memorials. The second largest dome (4.5 m diameter) in the church graces the centre of the roof of the parecclesion. A small passageway links the parecclesion directly into the naos, and off this passage can be found a small oratory and a storeroom. The parecclesion is covered in frescoes that emphasize the theological message of salvation, in keeping with the space's use as a funerary chapel. Within the Christian worldview, God raises the dead at the end of time, hence the significance of the Anastasis and Last Judgement scenes painted prominently on the ceiling. The image of the Anastasis is particularly renowned, appearing in many art history survey books as a key examplar of late Byzantine art.

1. Anastasis (literally Resurrection)": the Descent of Christ into the realm of the dead. Christ, who has just broken down the gates of Sheol (Hades), is standing in the centre and pulling Adam and Eve out of their tombs. Christ is adorned in vivid white garments as well as encircled by a radiant mandorla, setting him in contrast to the dark colors of the fresco's background. Behind Adam stand John the Baptist, David, and Solomon, and other righteous kings. Below is the bound personification of Death.
2. The Last Judgment, or Second Coming. Christ is enthroned with the Virgin and John the Baptist on either side of him. (This trio is also called the Deesis.)
3. Virgin and Child
4. Heavenly court of angels
5. Two panels of Moses

Along the walls of the Chora's parecclesion are arcosolia, arched recesses for tombs, likely intended for Theodore Metochites and his family. Also at this level are depictions of soldier saints, who wield swords as if protecting the tombs they accompany.

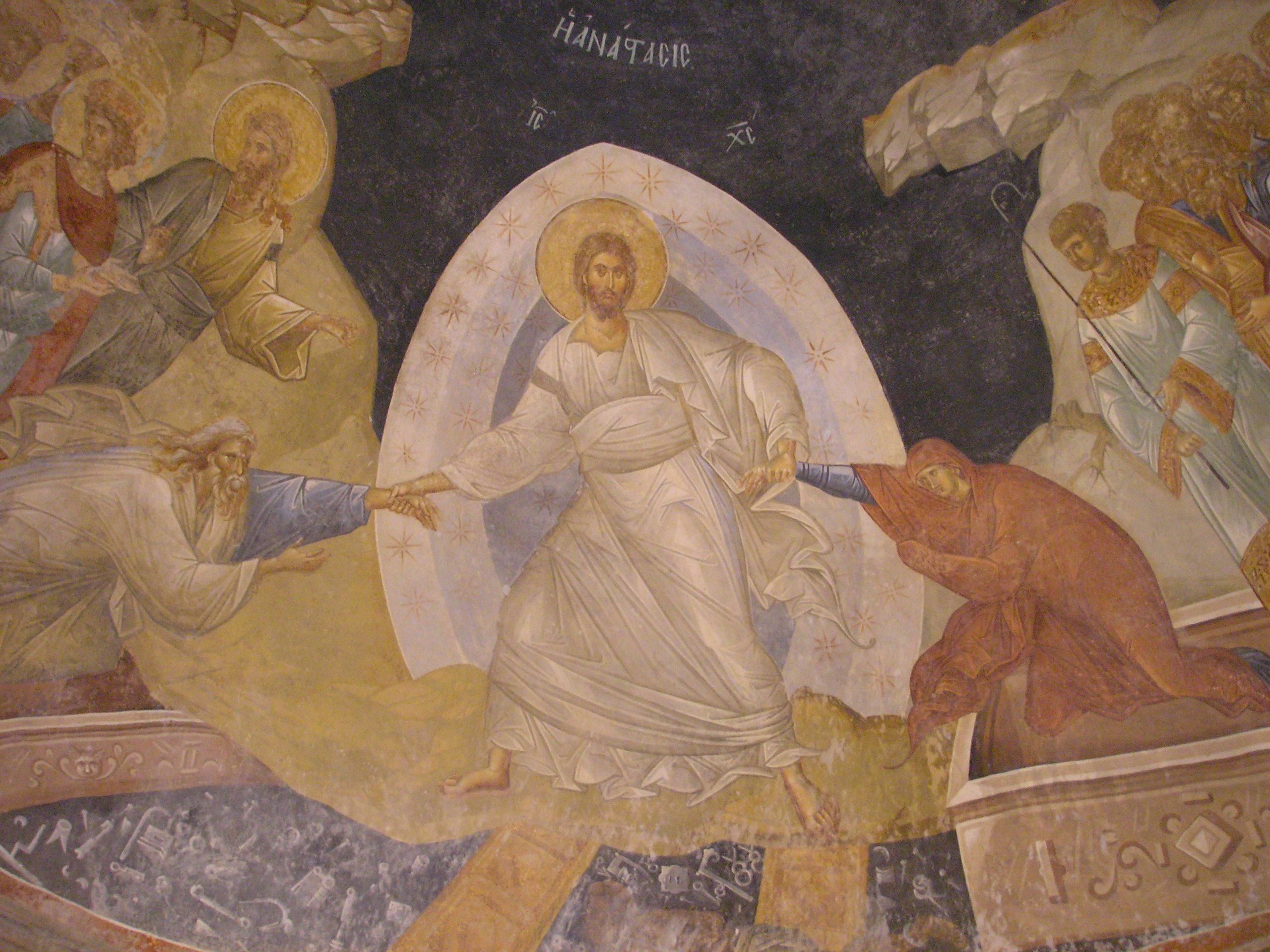
The Anastasis fresco in the parecclesion

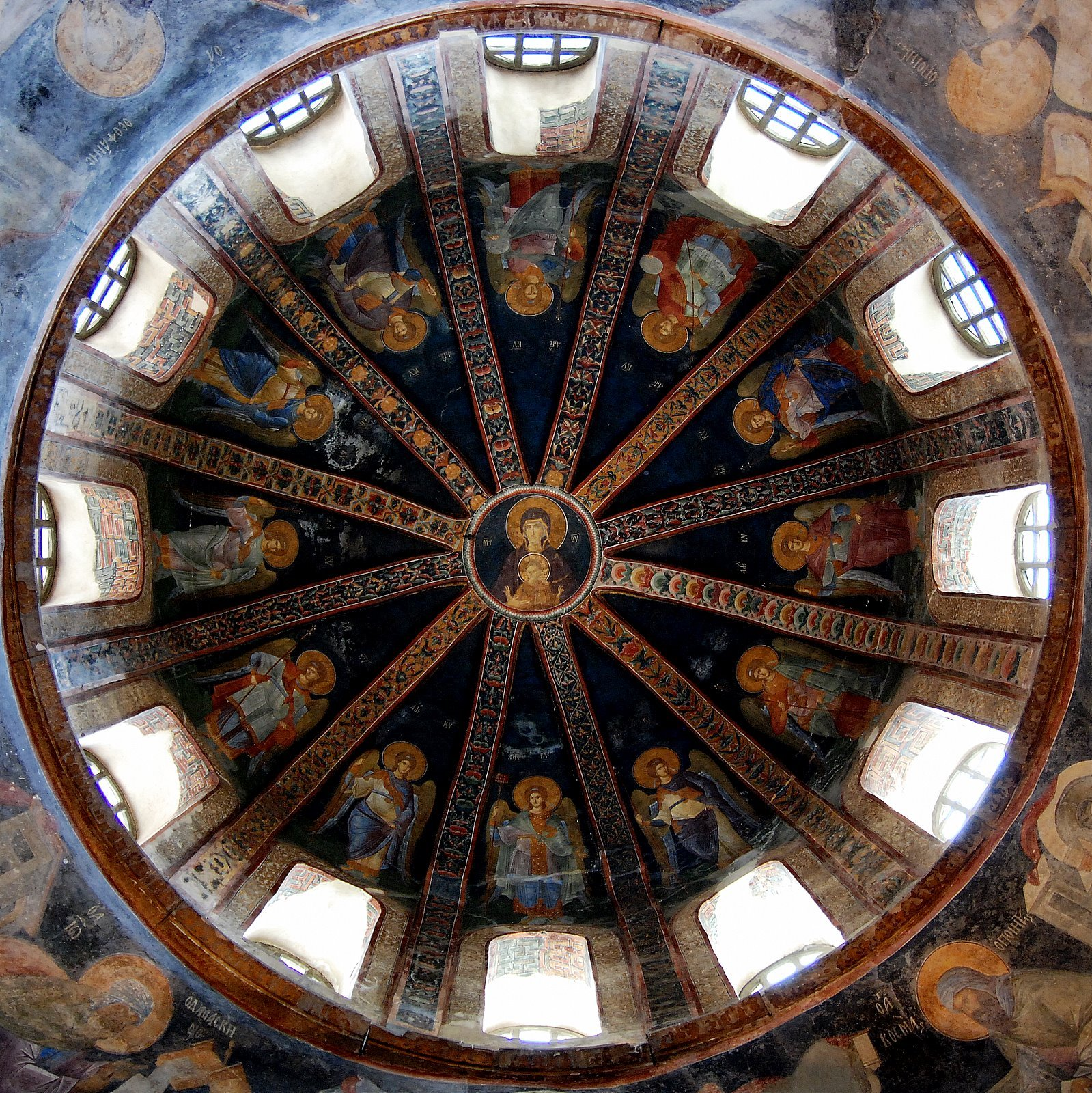
Virgin and Child, painted dome of the parecclesion

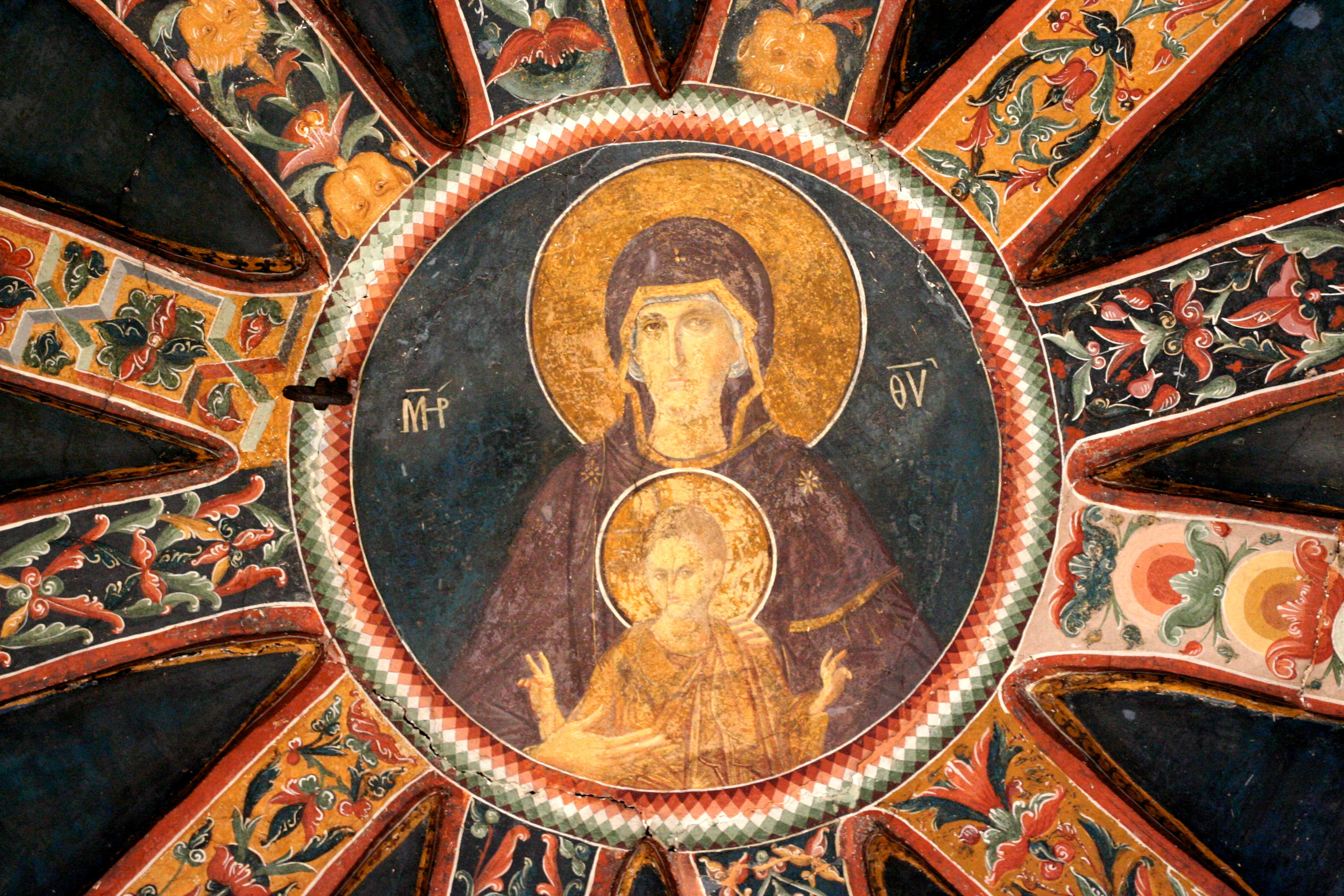
Close-up of the Virgin and Child, dome of the parecclesion

== Name ==
The original, 4th-century monastery containing the church was outside Constantinople's city walls. Literally translated, the church's full name was the Church of the Holy Saviour in the Country (Greek: ἡ Ἐκκλησία τοῦ Ἁγίου Σωτῆρος ἐν τῇ Χώρᾳ, hē Ekklēsia tou Hagiou Sōtēros en tēi Chōrāi). It is therefore sometimes incorrectly referred to as "Saint Saviour". The last part of the Greek name, Chora, referring to its location originally outside of the walls, became the shortened name of the church. The name must have carried symbolic meaning, as the mosaics in the narthex describe Christ as the "Land of the Living" (ἡ Χώρα τῶν ζώντων, hē Chōra tōn zōntōn) and Mary, the mother of Jesus, as the "Container of the Uncontainable" (ἡ Χώρα τοῦ Ἀχωρήτου, hē Chōra tou Achōrētou).

== See also ==
- Christianity in the Ottoman Empire
- Christianity in Turkey
- Icon of the Hodegetria
- Monastery of the Panaghia Hodegetria
- Church of the Virgin Pammakaristos
- Ancient Roman and Byzantine domes

== Literature ==
- Chora: The Kariye Museum. Net Turistik Yayınlar (1987). ISBN 978-975-479-045-0
- Feridun Dirimtekin. The historical monument of Kariye. Türkiye Turing ve Otomobil Kurumu (1966). ASIN B0007JHABQ
- Semavi Eyice. Kariye Mosque Church of Chora Monastery. Net Turistik Yayınlar A.Ş. (1997). ISBN 978-975-479-444-1
- Çelik Gülersoy. Kariye (Chora). ASIN B000RMMHZ2
- Jonathan Harris, Constantinople: Capital of Byzantium. Hambledon/Continuum (2007). ISBN 978-1-84725-179-4
- Karahan, Anne. Byzantine Holy Images – Transcendence and Immanence. The Theological Background of the Iconography and Aesthetics of the Chora Church (monography, 355 pp) (Orientalia Lovaniensia Analecta No. 176) Leuven-Paris-Walpole, MA: Peeters Publishers 2010.ISBN 978-90-429-2080-4
- Karahan, Anne. “The Paleologan Iconography of the Chora Church and its Relation to Greek Antiquity”. In: Journal of Art History 66 (1997), Issue 2 & 3: pp. 89–95 Routhledge (Taylor & Francis Group online publication 1 September 2008: DOI:10.1080/00233609708604425) 1997
- Krannert Art Museum. Restoring Byzantium: The Kariye Camii in Istanbul and the Byzantine Institute Restoration. Miriam & IRA D. Wallach Art Gallery (2004). ISBN 1-884919-15-4
- Ousterhout, Robert G. (1988). The Architecture of the Kariye Camii in Istanbul. Dumbarton Oaks Research Library and Collection. ISBN 978-0-88402-165-0.
- Robert Ousterhout (Editor), Leslie Brubaker (Editor). The Sacred Image East and West. University of Illinois Press (1994). ISBN 978-0-252-02096-4
- Moutafov, Emmanuel S. The Chora Monastery of Constantinople. Cambridge: Cambridge University Press (2025). (Elements in the History of Constantinople). ISBN 9781108946476 doi:10.1017/9781108946476
- Saint Saviour in Chora. A Turizm Yayınları Ltd. (1988). ASIN B000FK8854
- Cevdet Turkay. Kariye Mosque. (1964). ASIN B000IUWV2C
- Paul A. Underwood. The Kariye Djami in 3 Volumes. Bollingen (1966). ASIN B000WMDL7U
- Paul A. Underwood. Third Preliminary Report on the Restoration of the Frescoes in the Kariye Camii at Istanbul. Harvard University Press (1958). ASIN B000IBCESM
- Edda Renker Weissenbacher. Kariye: The Chora Church, Step by Step. ASIN B000RBATF8
