= Invasion of Yugoslavia order of battle: Yugoslav =

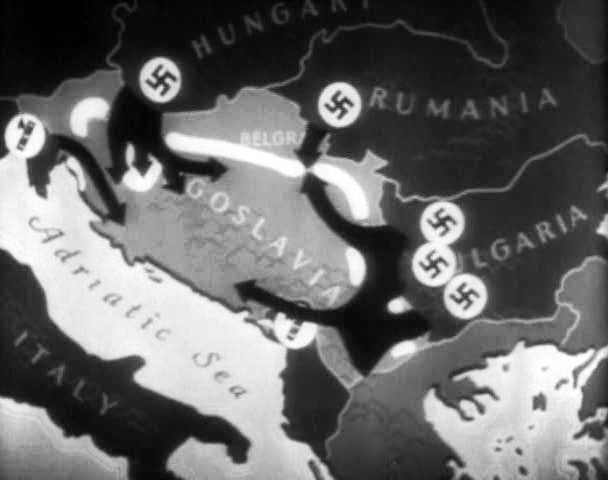
The German-led Axis invasion of Yugoslavia as shown in the United States Government Why We Fight documentary series

The Yugoslav order of battle before the invasion of Yugoslavia includes a listing (or order of battle) of all operational formations of the Royal Yugoslav Army (Serbo-Croatian Latin: Vojska Kraljevine Jugoslavije, VKJ), Royal Yugoslav Army Air Force (Serbo-Croatian Latin: Vazduhoplovstvo Vojske Kraljevine Jugoslavije, VVKJ) and Royal Yugoslav Navy (Serbo-Croatian Latin: Kraljevska Jugoslovenska Ratna Mornarica, KJRM) immediately prior to the World War II invasion of that country in April 1941.

The VKJ consisted of 33 divisions and a significant number of smaller formations, but due to tentative and incomplete mobilisation, only seven divisions and four smaller formations are known to have been at close to fighting strength and in their planned deployment locations when the German-led Axis assault commenced on 6 April 1941. The Yugoslav defence plan involved placing the bulk of its land forces close to its borders, with very limited strategic reserves in depth. Almost all of the divisions that had been effectively mobilised were concentrated in the 3rd Army Group deployed in the east of the country along the Romanian and Bulgarian borders between the Iron Gates and the Greek border. Most of the heavy weapons and armoured vehicles available to the VKJ were obsolete, most formations were heavily reliant on animal-powered transport, and the VKJ had only 50 tanks that could engage front line German tanks on an equal basis.

By 6 April 1941, the VVKJ had been almost completely mobilised, and consisted of four air brigades with more than 423 aircraft of Yugoslav, German, Italian, French, Czech and British design, including 107 modern fighter aircraft, and 100 modern medium bombers. Other than a small number of locally made Rogožarski IK-3 fighters, almost all the modern aircraft available to the VVKJ were of German, Italian or British design for which limited spares and munitions were available.

The KJRM consisted of a flotilla of river monitors based on the Danube and a small fleet based in several ports along the Adriatic coast. The blue-water navy centred on a flotilla leader, three smaller destroyers, four obsolescent submarines and a gunboat, supplemented by minelayers and torpedo boats. Some of the smaller vessels in the Yugoslav fleet had been inherited from the defeated Austro-Hungarian Empire following World War I and were obsolete.

== Royal Yugoslav Army ==
The war flag of the Kingdom of Yugoslavia

At the time of the invasion, the Royal Yugoslav Army (Serbo-Croatian Latin: Vojska Kraljevine Jugoslavije, VKJ) consisted of 29 infantry divisions, three horse cavalry divisions, and a divisional-sized mountain detachment. There were also a significant number of independent infantry, cavalry, mountain, and combined arms brigades, infantry and cavalry regiments and fortress troops, as well as 17 border guard battalions. The Commander-in-chief of the VKJ was the 17-year-old King Peter II, and the Chief of the General Staff was the Prime Minister, Armijski đeneral (Note: Armijski đeneral was equivalent to a United States lieutenant general.) Dušan Simović. The Yugoslav defence plan positioned almost all land forces close to its borders, with very limited strategic reserves in depth. The VKJ was heavily reliant on animal-powered transport, mainly oxen, and had only 50 relatively modern Renault R35 tanks that could fight German tanks on an equal footing, although these were only just being formed into a unit at the time of the invasion. The VKJ was organised into the 1st, 2nd and 3rd Army Groups, the independent 5th and 6th Armies and the Coastal Defence Command. The General Headquarters of the VKJ maintained command over five infantry divisions and a large number of smaller infantry, engineer and artillery units, as well as the only operational tank battalion. Each Army Group and independent Army was supported by an air reconnaissance group attached from the Royal Yugoslav Army Air Force (VVKJ). As mobilisation had been tentative and partial, many divisions were still in the process of mobilisation on 6 April 1941. The VKJ order of battle on 6 April 1941 is detailed below as provided by Niehorster. (Note: There are significant differences between sources on the components of Royal Yugoslav Army formations, so Niehorster, being the most recent source, has been used to ensure consistency throughout, except where it diverges from Terzić, a comprehensive Yugoslav source.)

mobilised Mobilised less staff and rear units.
in part Partly mobilised and moving to concentration area or assigned frontier.
commenced In process of mobilisation.
unknown Mobilisation status unknown.

=== 1st Army Group ===
The 1st Army Group was commanded by Armijski đeneral Milorad Petrović. It consisted of the 4th Army of Armijski đeneral Petar Nedeljković, responsible for the Yugoslav-Hungarian border and deployed behind the Drava between Varaždin and Slatina, and the 7th Army of Divizijski đeneral (Major General) Dušan Trifunović, which was responsible for the defence of the northwestern border with Italy and the Third Reich. (Note: According to Barefield, the majority of the 1st Cavalry Division constituted an Army Group reserve, and was located in the Zagreb area.)

Composition of 1st Army Group
Army	Formation	Mobilisation status	Notes
4th	27th Infantry Division Savska	commenced	—
4th	40th Infantry Division Slavonska	in part	—
4th	42nd Infantry Division Murska	commenced	—
4th	Detachment Ormozki	unknown	brigade strength
4th	127th Infantry Regiment	unknown	—
4th	81st Cavalry Regiment	unknown	horse cavalry
7th	32nd Infantry Division Triglavski	commenced	—
7th	38th Infantry Division Dravska	commenced	—
7th	Mountain Detachment Triglavski	mobilised	brigade strength (Note: According to Niehorster, Mountain Detachment Triglavski consisted of two mountain infantry regiments and a mountain artillery battalion, but Terzić states it consisted of one mountain infantry regiment and a mountain artillery battalion.)
7th	Mountain Detachment Rišnajaski	mobilised	brigade strength (Note: According to Niehorster, Mountain Detachment Rišnajaski consisted of two mountain infantry regiments and a mountain artillery battalion, but Terzić states it consisted of one mountain infantry regiment and a mountain artillery battalion.)
7th	Detachment Lika	mobilised	brigade strength
1st Army Group	1st Cavalry Division	commenced	horse cavalry

4th Army support units included one motorised heavy artillery regiment, one artillery regiment, a motorised anti-aircraft battalion, six border guard battalions, and the 4th Air Reconnaissance Group comprising eighteen Breguet 19s was attached from the VVKJ and was based at Velika Gorica just south of Zagreb. The 7th Army was supported by one artillery regiment and the 6th Air Reconnaissance Group consisting of sixteen Breguet 19s based at Brežice, northwest of Zagreb.

=== 2nd Army Group ===
The 2nd Army Group was commanded by Armijski đeneral Milutin Nedić, and consisted of Armijski đeneral Milan Rađenković's 1st Army, responsible for the area between the Danube and the Tisza, and the 2nd Army of Armijski đeneral Dragoslav Miljković, responsible for the border from Slatina to the Danube. There was no Army Group reserve, but the 2nd Army was to constitute a reserve consisting of the 10th Infantry Division Bosanska deployed south of Brod.

Composition of 2nd Army Group
Army	Formation	Mobilisation status	Notes
1st	7th Infantry Division Potiska	commenced	—
1st	3rd Cavalry Division	commenced	horse cavalry
1st	Infantry Detachment Senta	commenced	brigade strength
1st	Infantry Detachment Sombor	commenced	brigade strength
2nd	10th Infantry Division Bosanska	in part	in reserve
2nd	17th Infantry Division Vrbaska	in part	—
2nd	30th Infantry Division Osiječka	commenced	—
2nd	76th Cavalry Regiment	unknown	horse cavalry

The 1st Army was supported by one artillery regiment, one anti-aircraft battalion, and the 1st Air Reconnaissance Group consisting of fifteen Breguet 19s based at Ruma, just west of Sremska Mitrovica. 2nd Army support units comprised one artillery regiment, one anti-aircraft battalion, one border guard battalion, and the 3rd Air Reconnaissance Group consisting of sixteen Breguet 19s based at Staro Topolje just east of Brod.

=== 3rd Army Group ===
The 3rd Army Group was commanded by Armijski đeneral Milan Nedić. It consisted of Armijski đeneral Ilija Brašić's 3rd Army, responsible for the border with Albania between Lake Ohrid to Lake Skadar, and the 3rd Territorial Army of Armijski đeneral Jovan Naumović, which was responsible for the eastern sector of the Greek border and a sector along the Bulgarian border. The Army Group reserve consisted of the 22nd Infantry Division Ibarska, deployed around Skopje.

Composition of 3rd Army Group
Army	Formation	Mobilisation status	Notes
3rd	13th Infantry Division Hercegovačka	in part	—
3rd	15th Infantry Division Zetska	commenced	—
3rd	25th Infantry Division Vardarska	commenced	reinforced
3rd	31st Infantry Division Kosovska	mobilised	reinforced
3rd	Cavalry Detachment Komski	mobilised	brigade strength horse cavalry
3rd Territorial	5th Infantry Division Šumadijska	mobilised	—
3rd Territorial	20th Infantry Division Bregalnička	mobilised	reinforced
3rd Territorial	46th Infantry Division Moravska	mobilised	—
3rd Territorial	Infantry Detachment Strumički	unknown	brigade strength
3rd Territorial	21st Infantry Regiment	unknown	—
3rd Army Group	22nd Infantry Division Ibarska	in part	—

3rd Army support units included one artillery regiment, one anti-aircraft battalion, eight border guard battalions, and the 5th Air Reconnaissance Group consisting of fourteen Breguet 19s based at Tetovo west of Skopje. The 3rd Territorial Army was supported by one motorised heavy artillery regiment.

=== 5th Independent Army ===
The 5th Independent Army was commanded by Armijski đeneral Vladimir Cukavac, and had responsibility for the Romanian and Bulgarian borders between the Iron Gates and the Greek border.

Composition of 5th Independent Army
Army	Formation	Mobilisation status	Notes
5th Independent	8th Infantry Division Krajinska	in part	in reserve
5th Independent	9th Infantry Division Timočka	commenced	—
5th Independent	34th Infantry Division Toplička	mobilised	—
5th Independent	50th Infantry Division Drinska	mobilised	—
5th Independent	2nd Cavalry Division	in part	horse cavalry

The support units of the 5th Independent Army were two motorised heavy artillery regiments, an anti-aircraft battalion, two border guard battalions, and the 2nd Air Reconnaissance Group consisting of sixteen Breguet 19s based at Šarlince south of Niš.

=== 6th Independent Army ===
The 6th Independent Army was commanded by Armijski đeneral Dimitrije Živković, and was originally intended to form the strategic reserve for the VKJ. It was deployed around Belgrade and in the Banat region east of the Tisza. It held two infantry divisions in reserve in the lower Morava valley.

Composition of 6th Independent Army
Army	Formation	Mobilisation status	Notes
6th Independent	3rd Infantry Division Dunavska	commenced	—
6th Independent	49th Infantry Division Sremska	in part	understrength
6th Independent	Infantry Detachment Požarevački	unknown	brigade strength
6th Independent	Infantry Detachment Smederevski	unknown	brigade strength
6th Independent	Detachment Savski	unknown	brigade strength (Note: Detachment Savski consisted of the 1st Guards Infantry Regiment, the Guards Artillery Regiment and two motorised heavy artillery regiments.)
6th Independent	Detachment Banatski	mobilised	brigade strength (Note: Detachment Banatiski consisted of the 4th Infantry Regiment, the 8th Cavalry Regiment (horse), 1st Guards Cavalry Regiment (horse), 2nd Guards Cavalry Regiment (horse), the horse-drawn Guards Artillery Battalion, and one artillery battalion.)
6th Independent	Infantry Detachment Braničevski	unknown	regimental strength
6th Independent	5th Cavalry Regiment	unknown	horse cavalry
6th Independent	71st Cavalry Regiment	unknown	horse cavalry

The 6th Independent Army was supported by an anti-aircraft battalion and the 7th Air Reconnaissance Group consisting of eighteen Breguet 19s based at Smederevska Palanka.

=== Coastal Defence Command ===
Coastal Defence Command was commanded by Armijski đeneral Živko Stanisaviljević, and was responsible for the defence of the Adriatic coast from the Bay of Kotor to Gospić.

Composition of Coastal Defence Command
Army	Formation	Mobilisation status	Notes
Coastal Defence Command	12th Infantry Division Jadranska	commenced	—
Coastal Defence Command	Boka Kotorska Command	commenced	(Note: Boka Kotorska Command was commanded by Brigadni General (Brigadier) Vojislav Kuzmanović, and consisted of three fortress infantry regiments.)
Coastal Defence Command	Šibenik Command	commenced	(Note: Šibenik Command was a fortress infantry formation of brigade-strength.)
Coastal Defence Command	Čapljinski Command	unknown	infantry brigade strength
Coastal Defence Command	Trebinjski Command	unknown	infantry regiment strength

Coastal Defence Command was supported by a heavy artillery regiment and an anti-aircraft battalion, and a coastal reconnaissance squadron of four aircraft based near Mostar.

=== General Headquarters Direct Command ===
General Headquarters of the VKJ maintained direct command of five infantry divisions, four independent infantry regiments, two motorised engineer regiments and one tank battalion. (Note: The 1st Tank Battalion was equipped with 48 Renault FT and Renault NC27 light tanks and 8 Škoda S-1d light tanks.) A further tank battalion was being formed at the time of the invasion. (Note: The 2nd Tank Battalion was being formed with Renault R35 light tanks.) It also had at its disposal two motorised heavy artillery regiments, fifteen artillery battalions, two anti-aircraft battalions and five independent anti-aircraft companies.

General Headquarters Direct Command
Formation	Mobilisation status	Notes
Guards Infantry Division	unknown	understrength
1st Infantry Division Cerska	in part	—
33rd Infantry Division Lička	commenced	—
44th Infantry Division Unska	in part	—
47th Infantry Division Dinarska	commenced	—
22nd Infantry Regiment	unknown	—
37th Infantry Regiment	unknown	—
47th Infantry Regiment	unknown	—
48th Infantry Regiment	unknown	—

=== Major equipment ===
In April 1941, a significant amount of obsolete equipment was in service with the VKJ, much of which was of World War I vintage. For example, of the 7,000 artillery pieces, less than 60 per cent were relatively modern, and only 50 of the tanks on hand were of comparable quality to front line German tanks. The army inventory included the following major items of equipment:

Major equipment
Equipment	Number
Mortars	1,900
Light anti-tank guns	800
75mm field guns	823
105mm field howitzers	180
World War I-vintage howitzers	3,000
Anti-aircraft guns	250
Renault R35 light tanks	50
Škoda S-1d light tanks	50
Renault NC27 light tanks	50
Renault FT and M26/27 light tanks	50

Major items of equipment in service with the Royal Yugoslav Army

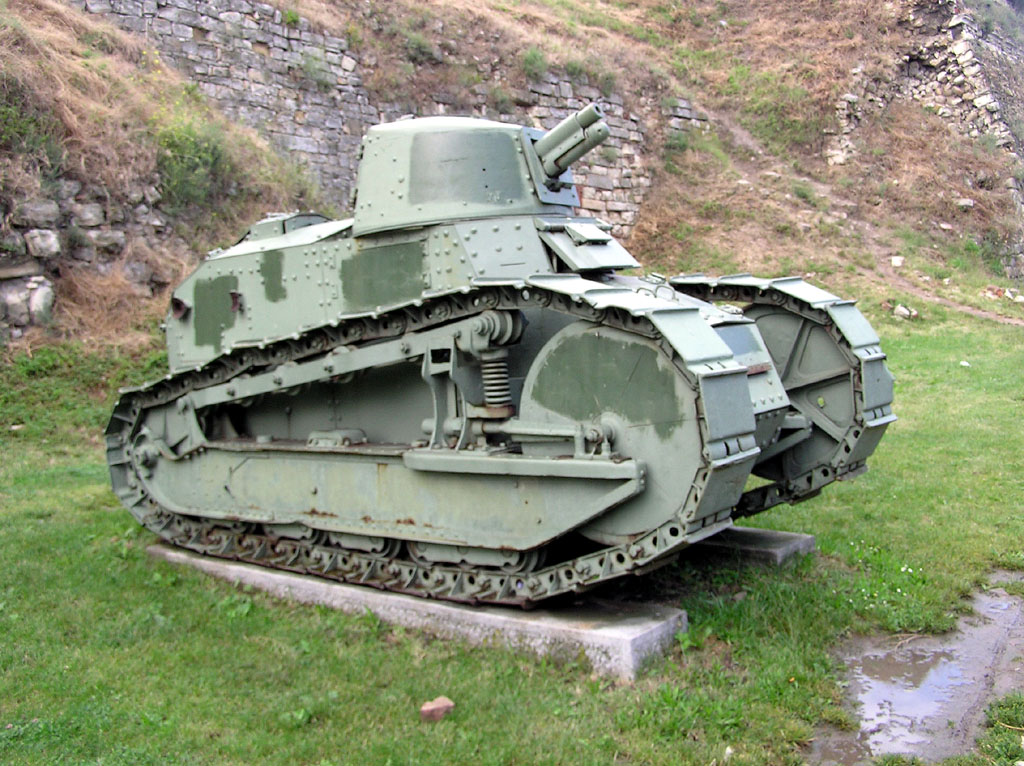
The French made FT tank was designed during World War I, and by 1941 was no match for German front line tanks.

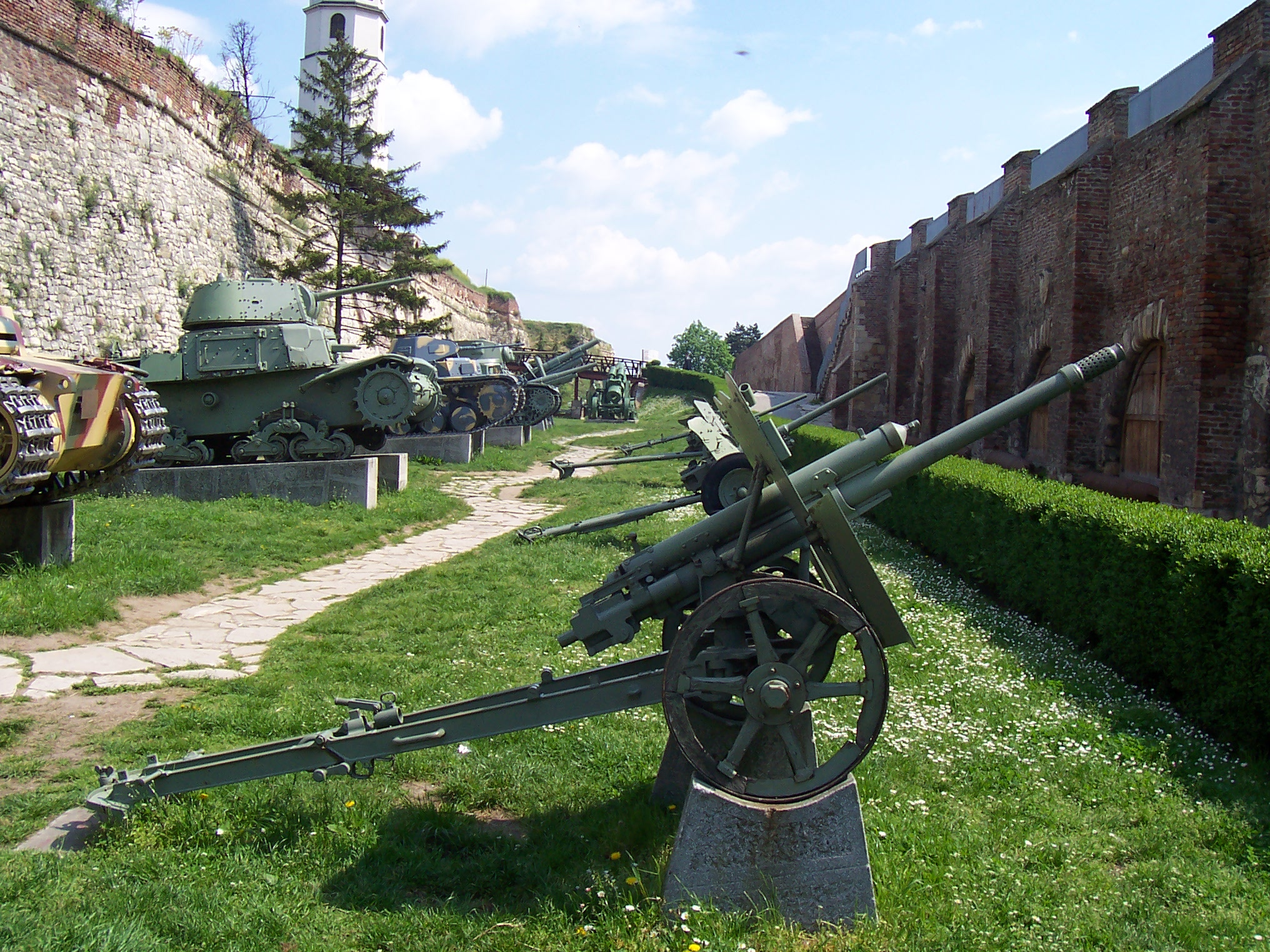
Škoda 37 mm Model 1937 anti-tank gun

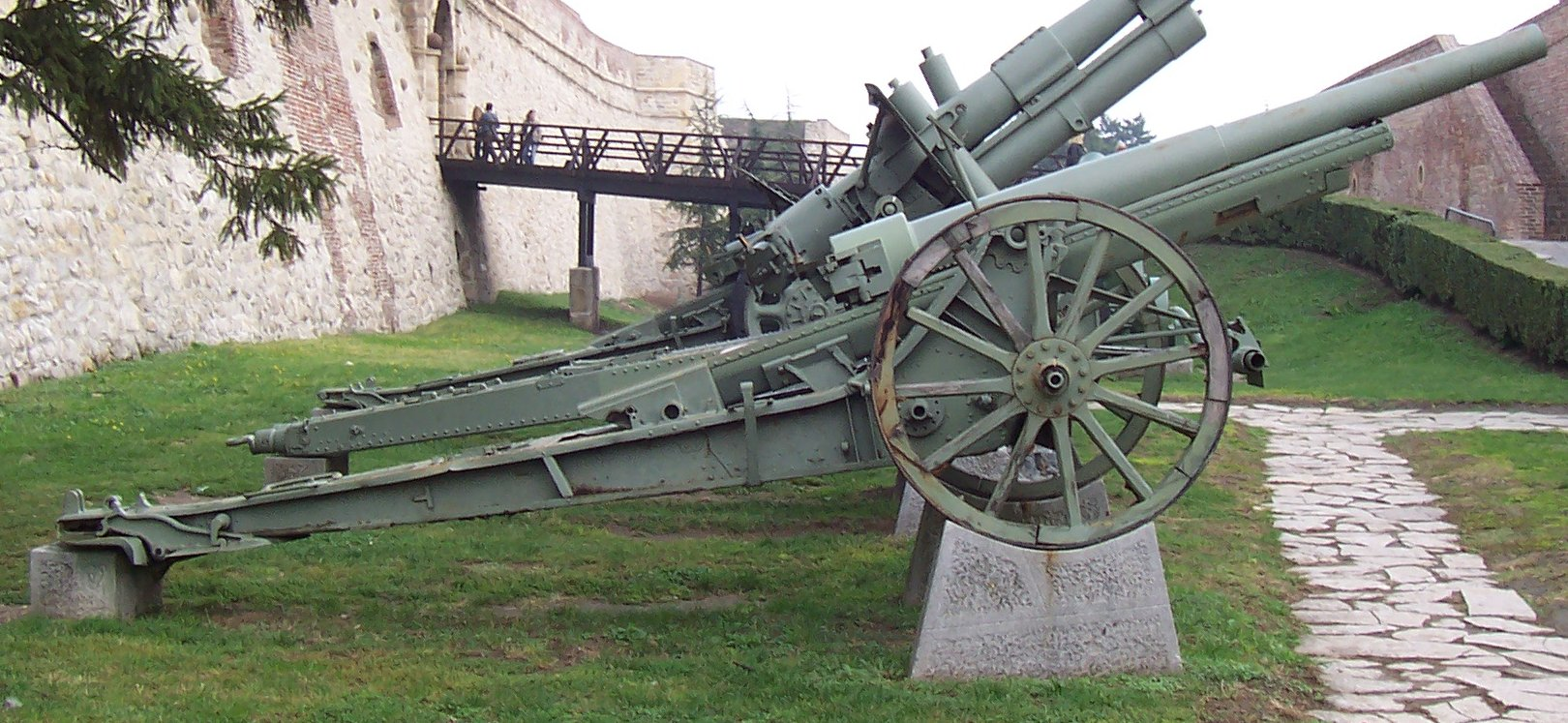
A World War I vintage Schneider-Ansaldo 105 mm M1913 field howitzer

== Royal Yugoslav Army Air Force ==
The roundel of the Royal Yugoslav Army Air Force

By April 1941, due to the difficulties Yugoslavia had faced in sourcing aircraft, the Royal Yugoslav Army Air Force (Serbo-Croatian Latin: Vazduhoplovstvo Vojske Kraljevine Jugoslavije, VVKJ) was equipped with 11 different types of operational aircraft, 14 types of training aircraft, and five types of auxiliary aircraft. These aircraft used 22 different engines, four different machine guns and two models of aircraft cannon. This made the training, supply and maintenance of the VVKJ quite problematic. The VVKJ was organised into a headquarters, four air brigades and one naval brigade. Its order of battle on 6 April 1941 is detailed below as provided by Shores, Cull and Malizia, the most detailed work available on the subject. (Note: Any differences with Niehorster, being a more recent but general source, have been identified in the text or through the use of notes.)

=== Air Force Headquarters ===
The VVKJ was commanded by Brigadni General (Brigadier) Borivoje Mirković, from his headquarters at Lješnica, and had two air groups and one independent squadron under its direct command. Niehorster includes the VVKJ transport group and the air training school as under the direct command of Army Air Force Headquarters, and they have been shown here for completeness.

Air Force Headquarters units
Unit	Location	Aircraft
11th Independent (Long Range Reconnaissance) Group	Veliki Radinci	9 × Bristol Blenheim Mk I light bombers 2 × Hawker Hind Mk I light bombers
81st Bomber Group	Mostar	14 × Savoia-Marchetti SM.79 medium bombers 3 × Messerschmitt Bf 109E-3a fighters 3 × Hawker Hurricane Mk I fighters 3 × Avia BH-33E biplane fighters (Note: Two Avia BH-33Es were detached to Podgorica.)
710th Liaison Squadron (Note: Aircraft types are consistent between Shores, Cull and Malizia, and Niehorster. Aircraft numbers are only provided by Niehorster.)	Lješnica	2 × Messerschmitt Bf 108 liaison aircraft 1 × Fieseler Fi 156 Storch liaison aircraft
Transport Group (Note: The aircraft types and numbers for the Transport Group are only provided by Niehorster.)	Zemun	10 × Lockheed Model 10 Electra airliners 2 × Spartan Cruiser transports 2 × Avia-Fokker F.39 airliners 1 × de Havilland Dragon Rapide airliner 2 × Caudron C.440 Goéland utility aircraft 1 × Aeroput MMS-3 light passenger aircraft 1 × de Havilland DH.60 Moth touring and training aircraft 1 × de Havilland Fox Moth passenger aircraft
Air Training School (Note: The aircraft types and numbers for the Air Training School are only provided by Niehorster. Shores, Cull and Malizia specify that there were ten training units, some of which were incorporated into operational regiments, with some being independent units. They state that they were equipped with Breguet 19s, Potez 25s and Caproni Ca.310 aircraft, and a large number of basic training aircraft of Yugoslav origin, but including some German Bücker Bü 131s.)	Mostar	3 × Hawker Hurricane Mk I fighters 3 × Messerschmitt Bf 108 liaison aircraft 2 × Messerschmitt Bf 109E-3a fighters 3 × Avia BH-33E biplane fighters

=== 1st Fighter Brigade ===
The 1st Fighter Brigade was commanded by Pukovnik (Colonel) Dragutin Rupčić, whose headquarters was at Zemun. It consisted of the 2nd and 6th Fighter Regiments and a liaison squadron.

Composition of the 1st Fighter Brigade
Formation	Unit	Location	Aircraft
2nd Fighter Regiment; HQ: Kraljevo	31st Fighter Group	Knić	19 × Messerschmitt Bf 109E-3a fighters
2nd Fighter Regiment; HQ: Kraljevo	52nd Fighter Group	Knić	15 × Hawker Hurricane I fighters
6th Fighter Regiment; HQ: Zemun	32nd Fighter Group	Prnjavor	27 × Messerschmitt Bf 109E-3a fighters
6th Fighter Regiment; HQ: Zemun	51st Fighter Group	Zemun	10 × Messerschmitt Bf 109E-3a fighters 6 × Rogožarski IK-3 fighters
—	702nd Liaison Squadron (Note: Shores, Cull and Malizia, specify Messerschmitt Bf 108 liaison aircraft and Fieseler Fi 156 liaison aircraft, Niehorster specifies Messerschmitt Bf 109E-3a fighters instead of Fieseler Fi 156 liaison aircraft.)	Zemun	Messerschmitt Bf 108 liaison aircraft Fieseler Fi 156 liaison aircraft

=== 2nd Mixed Air Brigade ===
The 2nd Mixed Air Brigade was commanded by Pukovnik Jakov Đorđević, whose headquarters was at Nova Topola. It consisted of the 4th Fighter Regiment, the 8th Bomber Regiment, and a liaison squadron.

Composition of the 2nd Mixed Air Brigade
Formation	Unit	Location	Aircraft
4th Fighter Regiment; HQ: Zagreb	33rd Fighter Group	Bosanski Aleksandrovac	13 × Hawker Hurricane Mk I fighters
4th Fighter Regiment; HQ: Zagreb	34th Fighter Group	Bosanski Aleksandrovac	7 × Hawker Hurricane Mk I fighters 8 ×Ikarus IK-2 fighters
8th Bomber Regiment; HQ: Zagreb	68th Bomber Group	Rovine	12 × Bristol Blenheim Mk I light bombers
8th Bomber Regiment; HQ: Zagreb	69th Bomber Group	Rovine	12 × Bristol Blenheim Mk I light bombers
—	703rd Liaison Squadron (Note: Neither Shores, Cull and Malizia, or Niehorster. specify aircraft numbers)	Nova Topola	Messerschmitt Bf 108 liaison aircraft Fieseler Fi 156 liaison aircraft

=== 3rd Mixed Air Brigade ===
The 3rd Mixed Air Brigade was commanded by Pukovnik Nikola Obuljen, whose headquarters was at Stubol. It consisted of the 3rd Bomber Regiment, 5th Fighter Regiment, and a liaison squadron.

Composition of the 3rd Mixed Air Brigade
Formation	Unit	Location	Aircraft
3rd Bomber Regiment; HQ: Skopje	63rd Bomber Group	Petrovec	30 × Dornier Do 17K light bombers
3rd Bomber Regiment; HQ: Skopje	64th Bomber Group	Petrovec	30 × Dornier Do 17K light bombers
5th Fighter Regiment; HQ: Niš	35th Fighter Group	Kosančić	15 × Hawker Fury Mk II biplane fighters
5th Fighter Regiment; HQ: Niš	36th Fighter Group	Režanovačka Kosa	15 × Hawker Fury Mk II biplane fighters
—	704th Liaison Squadron (Note: Neither Shores, Cull and Malizia, or Niehorster. specify aircraft numbers)	Stubol	Messerschmitt Bf 108 liaison aircraft Fieseler Fi 156 liaison aircraft

=== 4th Bomber Brigade ===
The 4th Bomber Brigade was commanded by Pukovnik Petar Vukčević, whose headquarters was at Ljubić. It consisted of the 1st and 7th Bomber Regiments and a liaison squadron.

Composition of the 4th Bomber Brigade
Formation	Unit	Location	Aircraft
1st Bomber Regiment; HQ: Novi Sad	61st Bomber Group (Note: Niehorster specifies that the 61st Bomber Group included 2 × Breguet 19 reconnaissance aircraft and 1 × Bücker Bü 131 biplane trainer aircraft.)	Bijeljina	11 × Bristol Blenheim Mk I light bombers
1st Bomber Regiment; HQ: Novi Sad	62nd Bomber Group (Note: Niehorster specifies that the 62nd Bomber Group included 2 × Breguet 19 reconnaissance aircraft and 1 × Bücker Bü 131 biplane trainer aircraft.)	Bijeljina	12 × Bristol Blenheim Mk I light bombers
7th Bomber Regiment; HQ: Mostar	66th Bomber Group	Preljina	13 × Savoia-Marchetti SM.79 medium bombers
7th Bomber Regiment; HQ: Mostar	67th Bomber Group	Gorobilje	13 × Savoia-Marchetti SM.79 medium bombers
—	705th Liaison Squadron (Note: Neither Shores, Cull and Malizia, or Niehorster specify aircraft numbers)	Ljubić	Messerschmitt Bf 108 liaison aircraft Fieseler Fi 156 liaison aircraft

=== Aircraft types ===
The Royal Yugoslav Army Air Force inventory in April 1941 included more than 423 aircraft of Yugoslav, German, Italian, French, Czech and British design, in addition to 20 largely civilian transport aircraft which had been pressed into military service. Of these, 107 of the fighter aircraft were of modern design, the remainder were not capable of meeting front line Axis aircraft on close to equal terms, and were therefore considered obsolete. Some bomber and reconnaissance aircraft were also considered obsolete for the same reason.

Aircraft types
Aircraft type	Model	Class	Number	Origin/notes
Fighter aircraft	Messerschmitt Bf 109E-3	—	61	Germany
Fighter aircraft	Hawker Hurricane Mk I	—	41	United Kingdom
Fighter aircraft	Hawker Fury Mk II biplane	—	30	United Kingdom (obsolete)
Fighter aircraft	Ikarus IK-2	—	8	Yugoslavia (obsolete)
Fighter aircraft	Rogožarski IK-3	—	6	Yugoslavia
Fighter aircraft	Avia BH-33E	—	6	Czechoslovakia (obsolete)
Bomber aircraft	Dornier Do 17Ka	medium	60	Germany
Bomber aircraft	Savoia-Marchetti SM 79-I	medium	40	Italy
Bomber aircraft	Bristol Blenheim Mk I	light	56	United Kingdom
Bomber aircraft	Hawker Hind Mk I biplane	light	2	United Kingdom (obsolete)
Reconnaissance aircraft	Caproni Ca.310	—	unknown	Italy
Reconnaissance aircraft	Breguet 19	—	113	France (obsolete)
Liaison aircraft	Messerschmitt Bf 108	—	unknown	Germany
Liaison aircraft	Fieseler Fi 156	—	unknown	Germany

Between 6 and 17 April 1941, the VVKJ took receipt of additional aircraft, including eight Hawker Hurricane Mk Is, six Dornier Do 17Ks, four Bristol Blenheim Mk Is, two Icarus IK-2s, one Messerschmitt Bf 109E-3 and one Rogožarski IK-3.

Aircraft types in service with the Royal Yugoslav Army Air Force

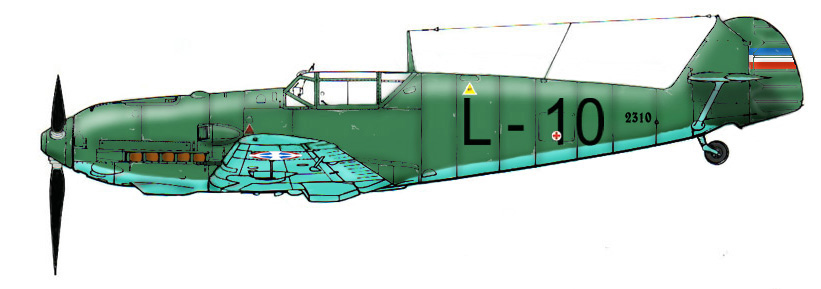
A Messerschmitt Bf 109E-3 with VVKJ markings

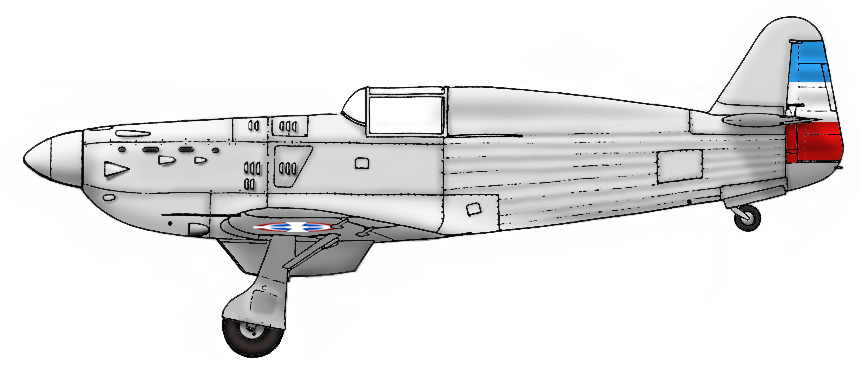
A Rogožarski IK-3 with VVKJ markings

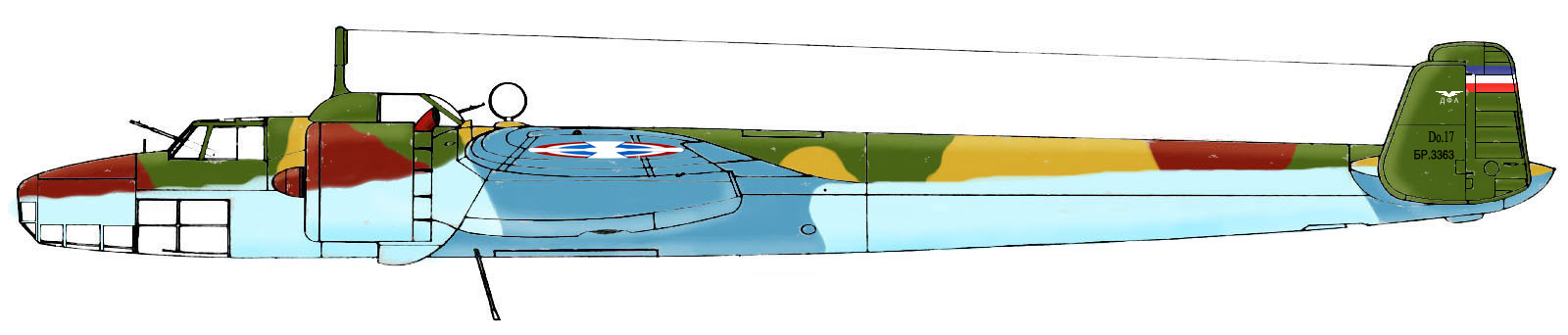
A Dornier Do 17Ka with VVKJ markings

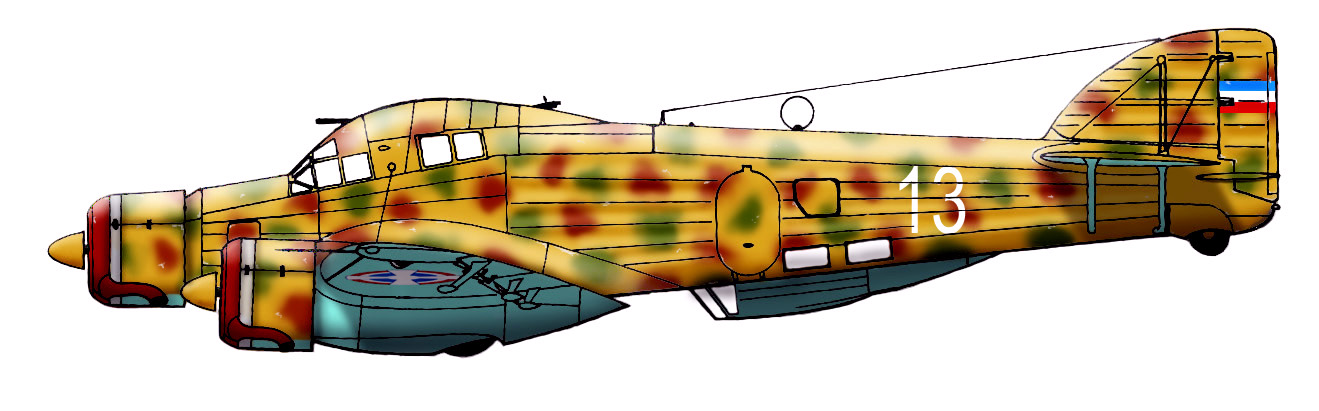
A Savoia-Marchetti SM 79-I with VVKJ markings

== Royal Yugoslav Navy ==
The naval ensign of the Kingdom of Yugoslavia

The Royal Yugoslav Navy (Serbo-Croatian Latin: Kraljevska Jugoslovenska Ratna Mornarica, KJRM) was small, with its largest ships being an obsolete former German light cruiser (used as a gunnery training ship), one flotilla leader, and three smaller Beograd-class destroyers. The Chief of the Naval Staff was Rear-Admiral M.L. Polić, and the personnel of the KJRM comprised about 611 officers and 8,562 men. (Note: This figure was the total in 1938.) The KJRM was organised into Riverine and Lake Forces, the Maritime Air Force, Naval Coastal Command, three torpedo divisions, the Submarine Division, and a grouping of miscellaneous and training vessels.

=== Riverine and Lake Forces ===
The Riverine and Lake Forces of the KJRM were headquartered on the Danube river in Novi Sad, and were organised into the River Flotilla and three Lake Detachments. Each division of the River Flotilla except the Monitor Division included one or more mobilised customs motorboats.

River Flotilla
Division	Ship/vessel name	Type	Origin/notes
Monitor Division; HQ: Dubovac	Vardar	river monitor	Austria-Hungary former Austro-Hungarian Navy river monitor Bosna
Monitor Division; HQ: Dubovac	Sava	river monitor	Austria-Hungary former Austro-Hungarian Navy river monitor Bodrog
1st Mine Barrage Division; HQ: Bezdan	Drava	river monitor	Austria-Hungary former Austro-Hungarian Navy river monitor Enns
1st Mine Barrage Division; HQ: Bezdan	Šabac	river tugboat	—
1st Mine Barrage Division; HQ: Bezdan	—	river minelayer	—
1st Mine Barrage Division; HQ: Bezdan	—	river minelayer	—
1st Mine Barrage Division; HQ: Bezdan	—	river transport	—
2nd Mine Barrage Division; HQ: Stara Kanjiža	Morava	river monitor	Austria-Hungary former Austro-Hungarian Navy river monitor Körös
2nd Mine Barrage Division; HQ: Stara Kanjiža	R-XXI	river tugboat	—
2nd Mine Barrage Division; HQ: Stara Kanjiža	Senta	river transport	—
3rd Mine Barrage Division; HQ: Sremski Karlovci	Sisak	river tugboat	—
3rd Mine Barrage Division; HQ: Sremski Karlovci	—	river mine-layer	—
3rd Mine Barrage Division; HQ: Sremski Karlovci	—	river mine-layer	—
3rd Mine Barrage Division; HQ: Sremski Karlovci	—	river transport	—
4th Mine Barrage Division; HQ: Smederevo	Raška	river tugboat	—
4th Mine Barrage Division; HQ: Smederevo	—	river mine-layer	—
4th Mine Barrage Division; HQ: Smederevo	—	river mine-layer	—
4th Mine Barrage Division; HQ: Smederevo	—	river transport	—
5th Mine Barrage Division; HQ: Erdut	Tanasko Rajić	river tugboat	—
5th Mine Barrage Division; HQ: Erdut	—	river mine-layer	—
5th Mine Barrage Division; HQ: Erdut	—	river mine-layer	—
5th Mine Barrage Division; HQ: Erdut	—	river transport	—
Iron Gates Division; HQ: Donji Milanovac	Kumanovo (Note: The Kumanovo and two river transports formed the Juc Canal Group.)	river tugboat	—
Iron Gates Division; HQ: Donji Milanovac	Vitez (Note: The Vitez and two river transports formed the Sipski Canal Group.)	river tugboat	—
Iron Gates Division; HQ: Donji Milanovac	—	river transport	—
Iron Gates Division; HQ: Donji Milanovac	—	river transport	—
Iron Gates Division; HQ: Donji Milanovac	—	river transport	—
Iron Gates Division; HQ: Donji Milanovac	—	river transport	—

The Lake Ohrid Detachment was based at Ohrid and consisted of two river gunboats, Graničar and Stražar, and one or more mobilised customs motorboats. The Lake Prespa Detachment was based at Asamati, and it is unclear where the Lake Skadar Detachment was based. Both of the latter detachments consisted of one or more mobilised customs motorboats.

=== Maritime Air Force ===
The Maritime Air Force was headquartered at Kaštel Lukšić near Split, and consisted of three Hydroplane Commands each of regimental strength. (Note: Shores, Cull and Malizia specify only two Hydroplane Commands, the 2nd and 3rd.)

Maritime Air Force
Command	Group	Squadron	Location	Aircraft
1st Hydroplane Command; HQ: Vodice	12th Hydroplane Group	unknown	—	12 × Ikarus IO biplane flying boats
2nd Hydroplane Command; HQ: Divulje	3rd Hydroplane Group	5th Hydroplane Squadron	Tijesno	5 × Rogožarski SIM-XIV-H reconnaissance floatplanes 1 × Ikarus ŠM biplane floatplane
2nd Hydroplane Command; HQ: Divulje	3rd Hydroplane Group	25th Hydroplane Squadron	Zlarin and Visovac	6 × Dornier Do 22Kj reconnaissance floatplanes 1 × Rogožarski PVT floatplane
2nd Hydroplane Command; HQ: Divulje	4th Hydroplane Group	26th Hydroplane Squadron	Krapanj	5 × Dornier Do J flying boats 1 × Ikarus ŠM biplane floatplane 1 × Rogožarski PVT floatplane
2nd Hydroplane Command; HQ: Divulje	4th Hydroplane Group	15th Hydroplane Squadron	Zlarin and Visovac	2 × Rogožarski SIM-XIV-H reconnaissance floatplanes 6–7 × Ikarus IO biplane flying boats 1 × Rogožarski SIM-XH trainer
3rd Hydroplane Command; HQ: Boka Kotorska	1st Hydroplane Group	1st Hydroplane Squadron	Krtole	5 × Rogožarski SIM-XIV-H reconnaissance floatplanes 1 × Ikarus ŠM biplane floatplane
3rd Hydroplane Command; HQ: Boka Kotorska	1st Hydroplane Group	11th Hydroplane Squadron (Note: Shores, Cull and Malizia state that the 11th Hydroplane Squadron included 8–10 elderly training aircraft.)	Risan	2–3 × Rogožarski SIM-XIV-H reconnaissance floatplanes 1 × Heinkel HE 8 reconnaissance floatplane
3rd Hydroplane Command; HQ: Boka Kotorska	2nd Hydroplane Group	20th Hydroplane Squadron	Orahovac	6 × Dornier Do 22Kj reconnaissance floatplanes
3rd Hydroplane Command; HQ: Boka Kotorska	2nd Hydroplane Group	21st Hydroplane Squadron (Note: Shores, Cull and Malizia state that the 21st Hydroplane Squadron included a "Fleet" aircraft, but it is unclear what type they are referring to.)	Dobrota	5 × Dornier Do J flying boats 1 × Dornier D floatplane torpedo bomber 2 × Rogožarski PVT floatplanes
3rd Hydroplane Command; HQ: Boka Kotorska	2nd Hydroplane Group	Training Squadron (Note: Shores, Cull and Malizia state that the Training Squadron included a "Fleet" aircraft, but it is unclear what type they are referring to.)	Trogir	1 × Rogožarski SIM-XIV-H reconnaissance floatplane 1 × Rogožarski PVT floatplanes 2 × Ikarus IO biplane flying boats 1–2 × Rogožarski SIM-XI trainers 1 × de Havilland DH.60 Moth trainer several Ikarus ŠM biplane floatplanes

Maritime aircraft types
Model	Number	Origin/notes
Rogožarski SIM-XIV-H	15–16	Kingdom of Yugoslavia
Ikarus ŠM	3	Kingdom of Yugoslavia
Dornier Do 22kJ	12	Nazi Germany
Rogožarski PVT	5	Kingdom of Yugoslavia
Dornier Do J	10	Nazi Germany
Ikarus IO	20–21	Kingdom of Yugoslavia
Rogožarski SIM-XH	1	Kingdom of Yugoslavia
Heinkel HE 8	1	Nazi Germany
Dornier D	1	Nazi Germany
Rogožarski SIM-XI	1–2	Kingdom of Yugoslavia
de Havilland DH.60 Moth	1	United Kingdom

=== Naval Coastal Command ===
The Naval Coastal Command of the KJRM was organised into three sectors along the Adriatic coast of Yugoslavia.

Naval Coastal Command
Sector	Ship/vessel name	Type	Origin/notes
Northern; HQ: Selce	Malinska	minelayer	Austria-Hungary; Malinska-class minelayer
Northern; HQ: Selce	Silni	patrol craft tender	unknown
Central; HQ: Šibenik	Spasilac	salvage ship	German Weimar Republic
Central; HQ: Šibenik	Lovćen	water tanker	unknown
Central; HQ: Šibenik	Labud	minelayer	German Empire; Galeb-class minelayer
Central; HQ: Šibenik	Kobac	minelayer	German Empire; Galeb-class minelayer
Central; HQ: Šibenik	Mosor	minelayer	Austria-Hungary; Malinska-class minelayer
Central; HQ: Šibenik	Marjan	minelayer	Austria-Hungary; Malinska-class minelayer
Southern; HQ: Kotor	T1	torpedo boat	Austria-Hungary former Austro-Hungarian Navy 250t-class T-group torpedo boat 76T
Southern; HQ: Kotor	T3	torpedo boat	Austria-Hungary former Austro-Hungarian Navy 250t-class T-group torpedo boat 78T
Southern; HQ: Kotor	Jastreb	minelayer	German Empire; Galeb-class minelayer
Southern; HQ: Kotor	Galeb	minelayer	German Empire; Galeb-class minelayer
Southern; HQ: Kotor	Mljet	minelayer	Austria-Hungary; Malinska-class minelayer
Southern; HQ: Kotor	Meljine	minelayer	Austria-Hungary; Malinska-class minelayer
Southern; HQ: Kotor	D2	training boat	Austria-Hungary former Austro-Hungarian Schichau-class minesweeper Uhu, later Tb36
Southern; HQ: Kotor	Jadran	sail training ship	German Weimar Republic
Southern; HQ: Kotor	Jaki	miscellaneous auxiliary	unknown
Southern; HQ: Kotor	Vila	small converted yacht	unknown

=== Torpedo Divisions ===
The 1st Torpedo Division consisted of the flotilla leader Dubrovnik and two of the three Beograd-class destroyers, and was based at Kotor. The remaining Beograd-class destroyer, Ljubljana, was under repair at Šibenik at the time of the invasion. The 2nd and 3rd Torpedo Division consisted of torpedo boats, and were both based at Šibenik.

Torpedo Divisions
Division	Ship/vessel name	Type	Origin/notes
1st HQ: Kotor	Dubrovnik	flotilla leader	UK
1st HQ: Kotor	Beograd	destroyer	France; Beograd-class destroyer
1st HQ: Kotor	Zagreb	destroyer	Kingdom of Yugoslavia; Beograd-class destroyer
2nd HQ: Šibenik	Velebit	torpedo boat	Nazi Germany; Orjen-class torpedo boat
2nd HQ: Šibenik	Rudnik	torpedo boat	Nazi Germany; Orjen-class torpedo boat
2nd HQ: Šibenik	Kajmakčalan	torpedo boat	Nazi Germany; Orjen-class torpedo boat
2nd HQ: Šibenik	Durmitor	torpedo boat	Nazi Germany; Orjen-class torpedo boat
2nd HQ: Šibenik	Dinara	torpedo boat	Nazi Germany; Orjen-class torpedo boat
2nd HQ: Šibenik	Triglav	torpedo boat	Nazi Germany; Orjen-class torpedo boat
2nd HQ: Šibenik	Suvobor	torpedo boat	Nazi Germany; Orjen-class torpedo boat
2nd HQ: Šibenik	Orjen	torpedo boat	Nazi Germany; Orjen-class torpedo boat
2nd HQ: Šibenik	Četnik	torpedo boat	UK; Četnik-class torpedo boat
2nd HQ: Šibenik	Uskok	torpedo boat	UK; Četnik-class torpedo boat
3rd HQ: Šibenik	T5	torpedo boat	former Austro-Hungarian Navy 250t-class F-group torpedo boat 87F
3rd HQ: Šibenik	T6	torpedo boat	former Austro-Hungarian Navy 250t-class F-group torpedo boat 93F
3rd HQ: Šibenik	T7	torpedo boat	former Austro-Hungarian Navy 250t-class F-group torpedo boat 96F
3rd HQ: Šibenik	T8	torpedo boat	former Austro-Hungarian Navy 250t-class F-group torpedo boat 97F

=== Submarine Division ===
The Submarine Division was based in Kotor, and consisted of the submarine tender Hvar and four ageing submarines of British or French manufacture.

Submarine Division
Ship/vessel	Type	Origin/notes
Hvar	submarine tender	United Kingdom
Hrabri	Hrabri-class submarine	United Kingdom, 1928 based on unbuilt British L-class submarine
Nebojša	Hrabri-class submarine	United Kingdom, 1928 based on unbuilt British L-class submarine
Osvetnik	Osvetnik-class submarine	France, 1929
Smeli	Osvetnik-class submarine	France, 1929

=== Miscellaneous vessels ===
The KJRM included several miscellaneous vessels that were not allocated to a particular division. They included the gunnery training ship Dalmacija, the gunboat Beli Orao and the converted seaplane tender/minelayer Zmaj. (Note: Niehorster does not list the minelayers Gavran, Orao and Sokol, but both Willmott and Chesneau list them as active in the KJRM at the time of the invasion, so they have been included here for completeness.)

Miscellaneous vessels
Ship/vessel	Type	Location	Origin/notes
Dalmacija	Gazelle-class cruiser	Kotor	former German Empire SMS Niobe, Dalmacija was obsolete and being used as a gunnery training ship
Beli Orao	gunboat	Kotor	Kingdom of Italy; Royal yacht/escort
Zmaj	minelayer	Šibenik	Weimar Republic, converted seaplane tender
Perun	oil tanker	Kotor	Belgium
Gavran	minelayer	unknown	ex German Empire, Galeb-class minelayer
Orao	minelayer	unknown	ex German Empire, Galeb-class minelayer
Sokol	minelayer	unknown	ex German Empire, Galeb-class minelayer

Vessels in service with the Royal Yugoslav Navy

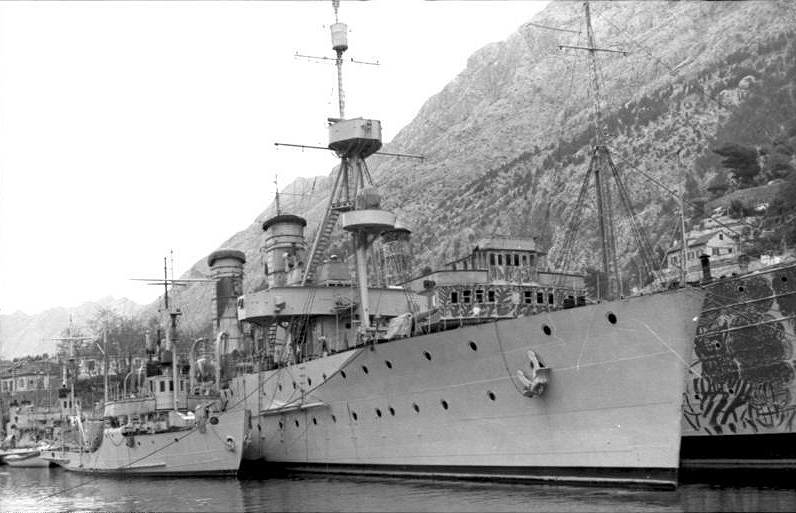
The light cruiser and gunnery training ship Dalmacija and the minelayers Mljet and Meljine docked at the Bay of Kotor

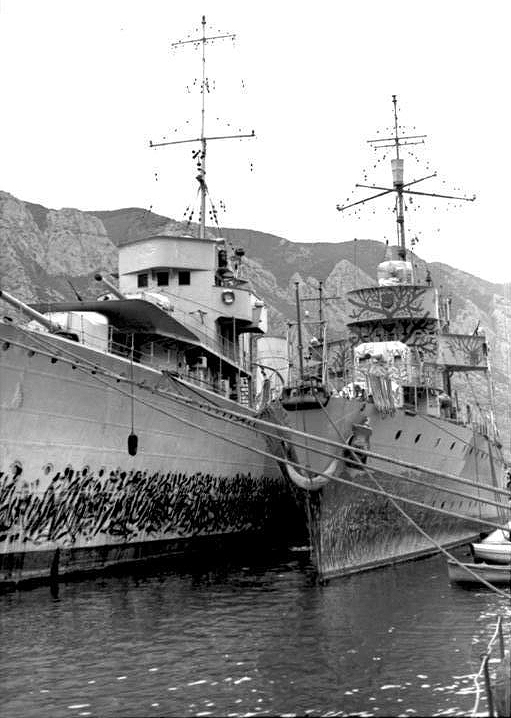
The destroyers Dubrovnik (left) and Beograd after their capture by Italy

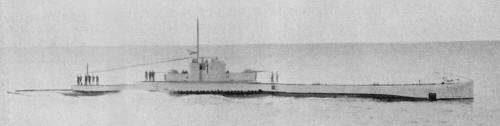
The submarine Hrabri

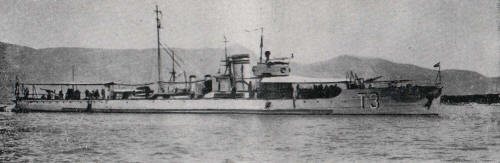
The torpedo boat T3

== See also ==
- Hawker Hurricane in Yugoslav service
- List of ships of the Royal Yugoslav Navy
