= Milutin Nedić =

Yugoslav general (1882–1945)

Army general Milutin Nedić
- Милутин Недић
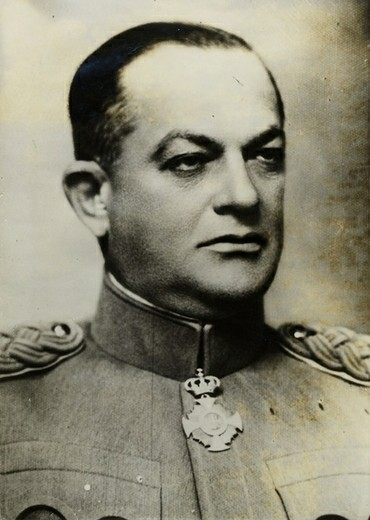
- Born: 26 October 1882; Sopot, Kingdom of Serbia
- Died: 1945 (aged 63); Salzburg, Allied-occupied Austria
- Relatives: Milan Nedić (brother); Dimitrije Ljotić (cousin)
- Military career
- Allegiance: Serbia (1901–18); Yugoslavia (1918–41)
- Branch: Serbian Army; Royal Yugoslav Army
- Service years: 1901–1941
- Rank: Armijski đeneral
- Commands: Royal Yugoslav Army; 2nd Army Group
- Conflicts: Balkan Wars; World War I World War II

Milutin Đ. Nedić (Serbian Cyrillic: Милутин Ђ. Недић; 26 October 1882 – 1945) was a Yugoslav Armijski đeneral (lieutenant general) (Note: Equivalent to a U.S. Army lieutenant general.) and Chief of the General Staff of the Royal Yugoslav Army prior to the outbreak of World War II. He was replaced in late 1938, and later commanded the 2nd Army Group during the German-led Axis invasion of Yugoslavia of April 1941. Nedić's command consisted of General Milan Rađenković's 1st Army, responsible for the area between the Danube and the Tisza, and the 2nd Army of General Dragoslav Miljković, responsible for the border from Slatina to the Danube. Nedić had no Army Group reserve, but the 2nd Army was to constitute a reserve of one infantry division deployed south of Slavonski Brod.

== Early life ==
Milutin Nedić was born in the Belgrade suburb of Sopot on 26 October 1882, to Đorđe and Pelagija Nedić (née Ilić). His was an old revolutionary family. His brother Milan would go on to have a long military career lasting until World War II. Nedić's father was a district chief and his mother was a schoolteacher. She was the granddaughter of Nikola Mihailović, who was mentioned in the writings of the poet Sima Milutinović Sarajlija and served as an ally to the revolutionary leader Karađorđe. The Nedić family was originally from the village of Zaoka, near Lazarevac. It traced its origins to two brothers, Damitrije and Gligorije, who had defended the Čokešina Monastery from the Turks during the Serbian Revolution. The family received its surname from Nedić's great-grandmother Neda, who was a member of the Vasojevići tribe of Montenegro.

In 1920, Nedić married Anastasija Krsmanović, the daughter of a successful Belgrade merchant. The couple had one child, a son named Nastas. After Anastasija's death, he married a Jelica Hristić, daughter of lawyer, diplomat, and Minister of Justice, Kosta Hristić, and granddaughter of Serbia's 4 times prime minister, Nikola Hristić.

== Military career ==
=== Balkan Wars and World War I ===
Nedić attended the Military Academy in Belgrade in the late-19th century, and finished first in his class. He began his military service in 1901, and participated in both Balkan Wars, during which he was in the communications section of the Supreme Command and later adjutant to the Chief of the General Staff. During World War I, Nedić was the chief of the General Staff section of the Ministry of War, and chief of staff of the Drinska Division.

=== Interwar period ===
During the interwar period, Nedić was the Yugoslav military attaché in Bulgaria, France and Italy, before being appointed as the General Officer Commanding the Air Force. He remained in this position until he was appointed as Chief of the General Staff in September 1936.

On 17 September 1938, Nedić approved a Yugoslav war plan to address a potential attack from the north following Germany's annexation of Austria (the Anschluss). In October, he was replaced as Chief of the General Staff by General Dušan Simović, who implemented a new war plan code-named Plan S ("S" standing for sever, or north). Nedić became the Minister of the Army and Navy. Contemporary British diplomatic staff described him as having "a charming personality", and stated that he was "very energetic and keen". However, they also blamed him for the indecision that plagued Yugoslav air policy during his time as minister.

=== World War II ===
Nedić commanded the 2nd Army Group during the German-led Axis invasion of Yugoslavia of April 1941. Nedić's command consisted of General Milan Rađenković's 1st Army, responsible for the area between the Danube and the Tisza, and the 2nd Army of General Dragoslav Miljković, responsible for the border from Slatina to the Danube. Nedić had no Army Group reserve, but the 2nd Army was to constitute a reserve of one infantry division deployed south of Slavonski Brod. During the invasion, he was taken into captivity by the Germans and detained in a German prisoner-of-war camp in Germany. The Germans allowed Nedić to return to Belgrade in 1942. He left Belgrade in October 1944 and retreated to Austria, where he committed suicide in 1945.

== Footnotes ==
Military offices
Preceded by Ljubomir Marić	Chief of the General Staff of the Yugoslav Royal Army; 1937 – 1938	Succeeded by Dušan Simović
Political offices
Preceded by Ljubomir Marić	Minister of the Army and Navy of the Kingdom of Yugoslavia; 1938 – 1939	Succeeded by Milan Nedić
