= Army general (Kingdom of Yugoslavia) =

Military rank

Army general Armijski đeneral
- Rank flag

- Cuff insignia
- Country: Kingdom of Serbia; Kingdom of Yugoslavia
- Service branch: Royal Serbian Army; Royal Yugoslav Army; Royal Yugoslav Army Air Force
- Rank: General officer
- Formation: 1900
- Abolished: 1946
- Next higher rank: Vojvoda
- Next lower rank: Divisional general
- Equivalent ranks: Admiral

Army general (Serbo-Croatian Latin: Armijski đeneral) was a military rank of the Kingdom of Serbia and later Kingdom of Yugoslavia. Established in 1900, it was abolished for some period after 1901, but it was again created in Kingdom of Yugoslavia after 1918 as Kingdom of Serbia passed along insignia and military ranks to newly named state. It was a high rank for Yugoslav generals, inferior only to the Vojvoda. Yugoslav army generals commanded armies, group of armies and held position of Deputy Commander in Chief of the Yugoslav Armed Forces, Chief of the Royal Yugoslav Army Air Force and Chief of the General Staff of the Royal Yugoslav Army. It was adopted and based on the similar French "commandant d'armée" later known as "général d'armée " - Army general.

== Promotion and use ==
This rank was usually given to Kingdom of Yugoslavia senior officers in the Ministry of Defense and General Staff and also used to promoted division generals under Law on the Organization of the Army and Navy from 19 July 1923 and 1929 by law and Decree on army formations from 1936. It was used for army and air officers while navy had its own rank of Admiral that was equal to army general. In order to be promoted to army general an officer had previously to have finished higher Military Academy, had successfully commanded with divisional area or similar division formation one year, as division general commanded at least one year or had a position more important than division commander at least a year, had highest military degrees and it was capable of highest command in the opinion of senior officers or the defence minister.

After the dissolution of King and Kingdom of Yugoslavia, the Yugoslav People's Army did not use this rank immediately but one similar to this was created under the name of General of the army. Only a few people in the Yugoslav People's Army held the title of 4 star General of the army - Veljko Kadijević, Nikola Ljubičić, Kosta Nađ and Ivan Gošnjak. In today's Serbian Armed Forces the equivalent is the rank of General - 4 star. For more see Military ranks of Serbia.

== List of army generals ==
At beginning of the war in April 1941, the Yugoslav armed forces had 13 active army generals:

- Milorad Petrović commanded the 1st Army Group
- Petar Nedeljković commanded the 4th Army under 1st Army Group
- Milutin Nedić commanded the 2nd Army Group
- Dragoslav Miljković commanded the 2nd Army under 2nd Army Group
- Milan Rađenković commanded the 1st Army under 2nd Army Group
- Milan Nedić commanded the 3rd Army Group
- Ilija Brašić commanded the 3rd Army under 3rd Army Group
- Jovan Naumović commanded the 3rd Territorial Army under 3rd Army Group
- Vladimir Cukavac commanded the 5th Army
- Dimitrije Živković commanded the 6th Army
- Sara Bjelica commanded the 7th Army
- Živko Stanisavljević led Coastal Defence Command
- Dušan Simović commanded the Royal Yugoslav Army Air Force and later was Chief of the General Staff

Their job was to command a total of 1,700,000 soldiers and officers during war, within an organisation specified in the 1936 decree regarding military formations under mobilisation and time of war. The 1,700,000 personnel were divided among:

- Operational army
  - three army group headquarters
  - seven army headquarters commanding a total of 28 infantry division, 3 cavalry divisions, 2 mountain detachments (13,900 soldiers each, comparable to a division in some other armies), 15 joint detachments (each consisting of one to three infantry regiments, one to three artillery regiments, and one cavalry regiment in some cases),
  - one guards cavalry brigade
  - two coastal headquarters
  - special forces headquarters
  - four regiments of heavy artillery
  - one motorized regiment of anti-tank artillery
  - two tank battalions
  - one chemical warfare battalion
  - one communication battalion
  - HQ of territorial air-defense
  - Many different transportation units and other units
- Reserve army
  - six Army territorial area with 16 divisional area, 49 military districts, 15 border fortress regiments
  - 49 infantry regiments and many other units.

=== Other notable army generals ===
- Milan Milovanović first Chief of the General Staff with that rank.
- Milan I of Serbia
- Danilo Kalafatović
- Stevan Hadžić - army general since 21. October 1923., 4 times served as minister of army and navy until his death
- Krsta Smiljanić - army general since 1923, commander of 3 army that hold civilian position as ban of Zeta and senator in Kingdom of Yugoslavia. Before in 1916 during WWI he was commander of Drina division that achieved breakthrough in Monastir offensive on Macedonian front under command of Field Marshal Petar Bojović.

== Comparative to other army ranks ==
Kingdom of Serbia and Kingdom of Yugoslavia rank of army general is equivalent to the UK and US ranks of general; It had same function as the French Army general because until 1930 most of Army formations was done using France army model. It was given to Chief of the General Staff and commanders of army or army groups that usually had few division under them. Divisions in Kingdom of Yugoslavia particularly after 1930 had been 27-28000 strong and thus similar to some other army's corps. Usual Italian infantry division like 64th Infantry Division Catanzaro at time of WWII had less than 7000 soldiers and US infantry division in 1943 consisted of 14,253 officers and soldiers while Soviet rifle division at same time had 9375 man. British division numbered 12772 man. All this illustrate how big was Yugoslavia division formation compared to others thus responsibility of 3 star Yugoslavia army generals was same as in other countries 4 star generals.
