= Šarlince =

Šarlince may refer to:

- Šarlince (Doljevac), a village in Serbia
- Šarlince (Leskovac), a village in Serbia
