= Divisional general =

Military rank

Divisional general (alternatively general of division) is a general officer rank who commands an army division. The rank originates from the French Revolutionary System, and is used by a number of countries. The rank is above a brigade general, and normally below an army corps general.

The rank is mostly used in countries where it is used as a modern alternative to a previous older rank of major-general or lieutenant-general.

== Specific countries ==
=== France ===
A French Army général de division translates as a "general of division". The French Air and Space Force equivalent is général de division aérienne (literally "general of air division"). Rank insignia is that of 3 white stars on the epaulette, sleeve mark or shoulder board. After World War II, the corresponding rank of divisional general was changed to major general, and before that it corresponded to lieutenant general.

As well as commanding a division, a général de division may be appointed as général de corps d'armée (a "corps general") commanding an army corps, or as a général d'armée (a "general of an army"), commanding a field army. These are not ranks, but appointments of the same rank. The insignia of a général de corps d'armée is four stars in a diamond formation, and that of a général d'armée is five stars in a cross-shaped arrangement. The arrangement for the air force is the same, but the ranks are called général de corps d'armée aérien ("general of an air corps") and général d'armée aérienne ("general of an air army") respectively.

==== Général de division ayant un commandement supérieur ====
Général de division ayant un commandement supérieur (literally, "divisional general holding higher command") was an unofficial rank used in World War I. At the time, France had a two-rank system of general officers; as a temporary measure, to bring its system into alignment with the rank systems of general officers of other countries, a horizontal bar was attached to the top or bottom of the three stars on the kepi and sleeves of the horizontal-blue uniform. Such divisional generals enjoyed the status and treatment of full generals.

=== Italy ===
The Italian army and Carabineer rank of generale di divisione translates as "divisional general". The air force equivalent is generale di divisione aerea (literally "general of air division").

The ordinary law n. 299, come into force on December 2, 2004, has restored the traditional ranks of Army Brigade General, Divisional General and Army corps general, which had been changed in 1997. Some general divisions wear a third functional star with red border, which indicates they are enrolled in a special responsibility or as deputy officials of their proximate superiors.

=== Poland ===
In the Polish Army, the rank was lower than that of Lieutenant General and higher than that of Brigadier General.

The rank of Major General in the Polish Army of the Second Polish Republic was introduced in 1922.

Silver insignia: a general's braid and two stars on the shoulder boards and the cap band; two braids on the peak; eagles on the collars of uniform jackets and coats.

According to the 1972 dress code for soldiers of the Polish People's Army, the Major General's braid on the peak of the garrison cap had two 6 mm wide braids sewn on next to each other, spaced 2 mm apart; the outer braid was sewn on 6 mm from the edge of the peak along its entire arc. The cap's braided band featured a general's braid, 3 cm wide and 3.5 cm high. Furthermore, in the middle of the band, within the gap in the braid, two stars were placed on a line parallel to the edge of the band. The shoulder boards featured a 3.5 cm high general's stripe placed across the entire shoulder board, 5 mm from the sleeve seam, and two stars placed along a straight line running through the center of the shoulder board. The first star was 1 cm from the stripe, and the second was 5 mm from the tip of the first star's shoulder to the concave angle of the second star's shoulder.

In the Army of Congress Poland, the rank insignia consisted of epaulettes with thick brooches and three stars.

In the Army of the Duchy of Warsaw, the rank insignia consisted of epaulettes with three stars, and double embroidery (seriform stripe) on the cap, collar, cuffs, and shoulder strap.

=== Serbia and Yugoslavia ===
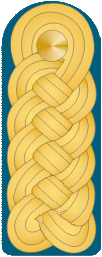
Serbian Дивизијски ђенерал

There was a proposition in 1898 by HM King Alexander I to introduce the rank of divisional general (Дивизијски ђенерал) to the Royal Serbian Army, along with brigade general and army general.

The newly created Royal Yugoslav Army introduced the rank of divisional general in 1923 and confirmed by law in 1929, modeled after French army, as the second general rank, higher than brigade general but lower than army general. The rank had a similar role as the French général de division at time of introduction, able to command a corps, as there was no separate rank for corps command. This rank was also used during World War II by the Chetniks. The most notable holders are Miroslav Trifunović and Ivan Prezelj. These ranks were replaced in 1945 by Tito's Yugoslav Partisans with the introduction of Soviet-style ranks.

== Divisional general's insignia ==
General de división
(Argentine Army)

Général de division
(Benin Army)

General de división
(Bolivian Army)

General de divisão
(Brazilian Army)

Général de division
(Burkina Faso Ground Forces)

Général de division
(Cameroon Ground Forces)

Général de division
(Central African Ground Forces)

Général de division
(Chadian Ground Forces)

General de división
(Chilean Army)

Général de division
(Congolese Ground Forces)

General de división
(Cuban Revolutionary Army)

General de división
(Ecuadorian Army)

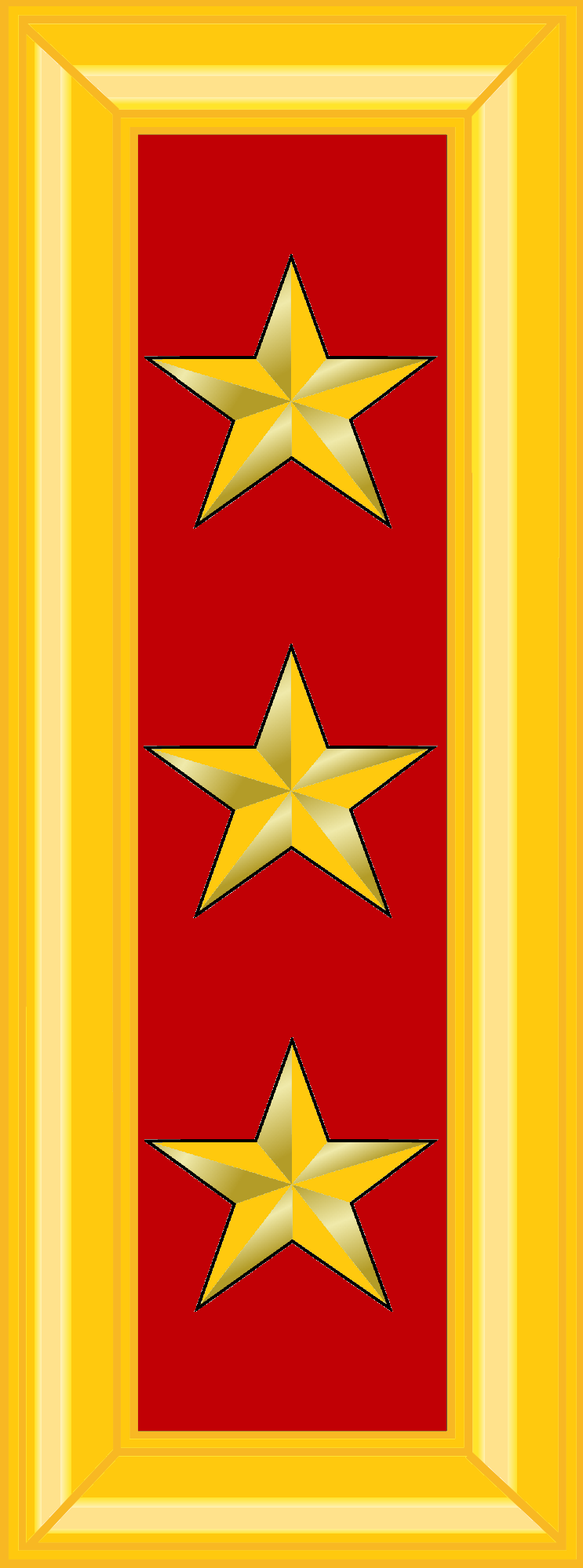
General de división
(Salvadoran Army)

Général de division
(French Army)

General de división
(Guatemalan Army)

Général de division
(Guinea Ground Forces)

General de división
(Honduran Army)

Generale di Divisione
(Maggior Generale)
(Italian Army)

Général de division
(Ivory Coast Ground Forces)

Général de division
(Madagascar Ground Forces)

Général de division
(Malian Ground Forces)

General de división
(Mexican Army)

General de divizie
(Moldovan Ground Forces)

Général de division
Arabic: Fariq
(Royal Moroccan Army)

Général de division
(Niger Ground Forces)

General de división
(Paraguayan Army)

General de división
(Peruvian Army)

Generał dywizji
(Polish Land Forces)

Général de division
(Senegalese Ground Forces)

General de división
(Spanish Army)

Divisionär
(French: Divisionnaire)
(Swiss Army)

Général de division
(Togolese Ground Forces)

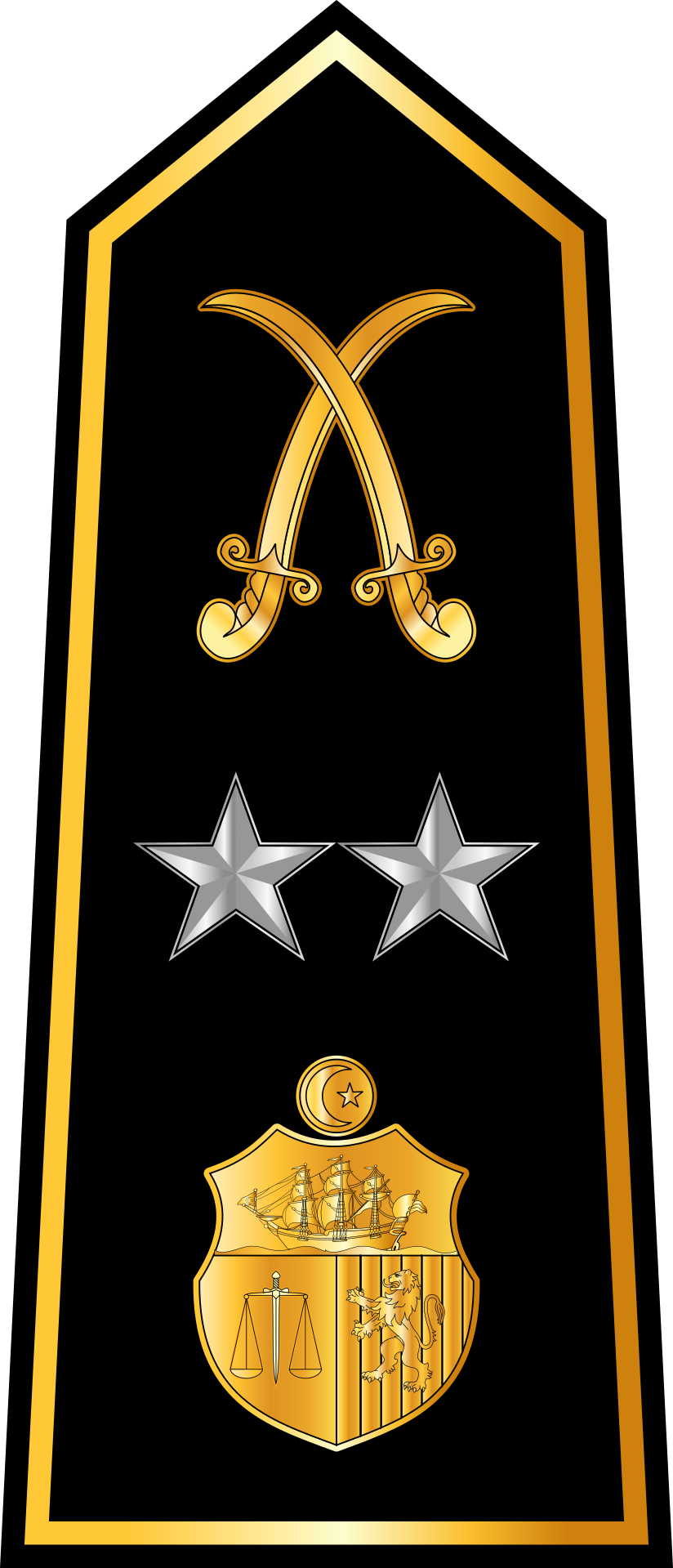
Général de division
(Arabic: فريق, romanized: Fariq)
(Tunisian Army)

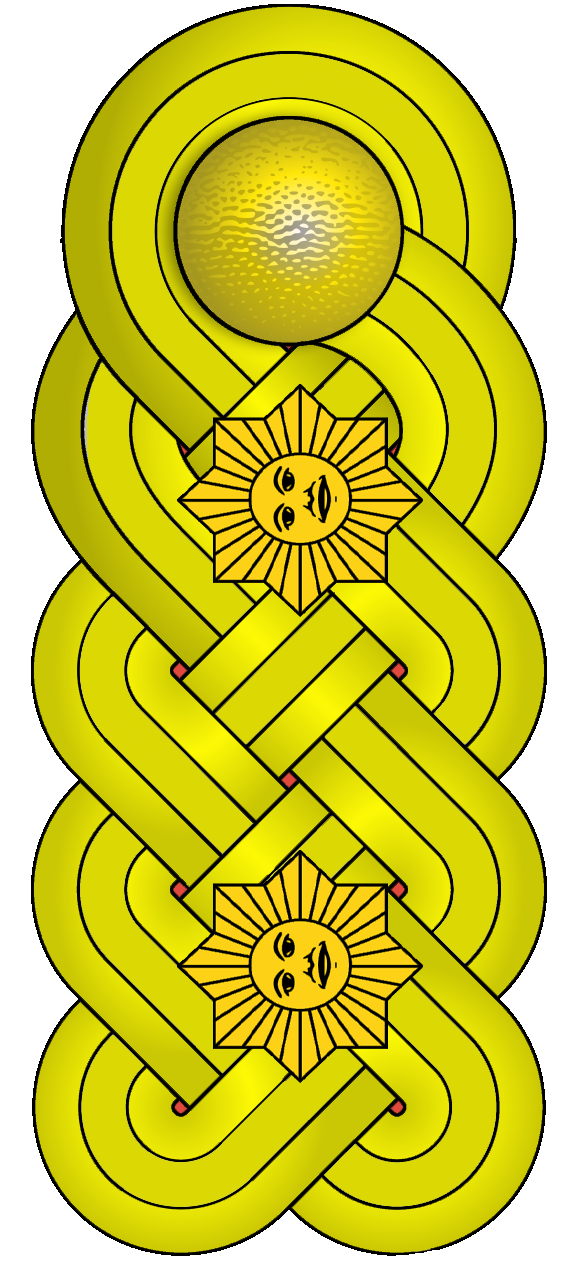
General de division
(Venezuelan Army)

== See also ==
- Divisional admiral
