= 2nd Army Group (Kingdom of Yugoslavia) =

Royal Yugoslav Army formation

- Country: Yugoslavia
- Branch: Royal Yugoslav Army
- Type: Infantry
- Size: Field army (Note: The Royal Yugoslav Army did not field corps, but their army groups consisted of several armies, which were corps-sized.)
- Engagements: Invasion of Yugoslavia (1941)

Commanders
- Notable commanders: Milutin Nedić

The 2nd Army Group was a Royal Yugoslav Army formation commanded by Armijski đeneral Milutin Nedić during the German-led Axis invasion of the Kingdom of Yugoslavia in April 1941 during World War II. It consisted of the 1st and 2nd Armies, comprising four infantry divisions, one horsed cavalry division, two brigade-strength infantry detachments, and one horsed cavalry regiment. It was responsible for the defence of the border with Hungary from Slatina to the Tisza river.

The 2nd Army Group was not directly attacked during the first few days of the invasion, but events to the east and west of its deployment area resulted in successive orders to withdraw to the lines of the Drava and Danube then the Sava. On 10 April, the crumbling defences of the 4th Army on the left flank of the 2nd Army Group had been penetrated by the German 8th Panzer Division, which then turned east and drove into the left flank of the 2nd Army Group on the following day. By the end of that day, the Germans had effectively routed the 2nd Army Group. Remnants continued to fight along the line of the Sava until early on 14 April, but mass surrenders began that day with tens of thousands of Yugoslav soldiers being taken into captivity by the Germans during their drive on Sarajevo in the centre of the country. The Yugoslav Supreme Command unconditionally surrendered in Belgrade effective at 12:00 on 18 April.

== Background ==
A map showing the location of Yugoslavia in Europe

The Kingdom of Serbs, Croats and Slovenes was created with the merger of Serbia, Montenegro and the South Slav-inhabited areas of Austria-Hungary on 1 December 1918, in the immediate aftermath of World War I. The Army of the Kingdom of Serbs, Croats and Slovenes was established to defend the new state. It was formed around the nucleus of the victorious Royal Serbian Army, as well as armed formations raised in regions formerly controlled by Austria-Hungary. Many former Austro-Hungarian officers and soldiers became members of the new army. From the beginning, much like other aspects of public life in the new kingdom, the army was dominated by ethnic Serbs, who saw it as a means by which to secure Serb political hegemony.

The army's development was hampered by the kingdom's poor economy, and this continued during the 1920s. In 1929, King Alexander changed the name of the country to the Kingdom of Yugoslavia, at which time the army was renamed the Royal Yugoslav Army (Serbo-Croatian Latin: Vojska Kraljevine Jugoslavije, VKJ). The army budget remained tight, and as tensions rose across Europe during the 1930s, it became difficult to secure weapons and munitions from other countries. Consequently, at the time World War II broke out in September 1939, the VKJ had several serious weaknesses, which included reliance on draught animals for transport, and the large size of its formations. Infantry divisions had a wartime strength of 26,000–27,000 men, as compared to contemporary British infantry divisions of half that strength. These characteristics resulted in slow, unwieldy formations, and the inadequate supply of arms and munitions meant that even the very large Yugoslav formations had low firepower. Generals better suited to the trench warfare of World War I were combined with an army that was neither equipped nor trained to resist the fast-moving combined arms approach used by the Germans in their invasions of Poland and France.

The weaknesses of the VKJ in strategy, structure, equipment, mobility and supply were exacerbated by serious ethnic disunity within Yugoslavia, resulting from two decades of Serb hegemony and the attendant lack of political legitimacy achieved by the central government. Attempts to address the disunity came too late to ensure that the VKJ was a cohesive force. Fifth column activity was also a serious concern, not only from the Croatian fascist Ustaše and the ethnic German minorities but also potentially from the pro-Bulgarian Macedonians and the Albanian population of Kosovo.

== Formation and composition ==
Yugoslav war plans saw the headquarters of the 2nd Army Group being raised at the time of mobilisation. It was to be commanded by Armijski đeneral (Note: Equivalent to a U.S. Army lieutenant general.) Milutin Nedić, and was to control the 1st Army, commanded by Armijski đeneral Milan Rađenković, and the 2nd Army, commanded by Armijski đeneral Dragoslav Miljković. The 1st Army was organised and mobilised on a geographic basis from the peacetime 1st Army District, headquartered in Novi Sad. On mobilisation it would consist of one infantry division, one horsed cavalry division, and two brigade-strength infantry detachments, and was supported by artillery, anti-aircraft artillery, and air reconnaissance elements of the Royal Yugoslav Army Air Force (Serbo-Croatian Latin: Vazduhoplovstvo vojske Kraljevine Jugoslavije, VVKJ). The 2nd Army was organised and mobilised on a geographic basis from the peacetime 2nd Army District, headquartered in Sarajevo. On mobilisation it was to consist of three infantry divisions and one horsed cavalry regiment, supported by artillery, anti-aircraft artillery and border guards, and also had VVKJ air reconnaissance support. The 2nd Army Group did not control any additional support units, and had several units with a significant proportion of Croat soldiers.

== Mobilisation and deployment plan ==
Main deployment areas of the 2nd Army Group, with the locations of Belgrade, Sarajevo and Banja Luka highlighted.

After unrelenting political pressure from Adolf Hitler, Yugoslavia signed the Tripartite Pact on 25 March 1941. On 27 March, a military coup d'état overthrew the government that had signed the pact, and a new government was formed under the commander of the VVKJ, Armijski đeneral Dušan Simović. A general mobilisation was not initiated by the new government until 3 April 1941, not to provoke Germany any further and thus precipitating war. However, on the same day as the coup, Hitler issued Führer Directive 25 which called for Yugoslavia to be treated as a hostile state, and on 3 April, Führer Directive 26 was issued, detailing the plan of attack and command structure for the German-led Axis invasion, which was to commence on 6 April.

The deployment plan for 2nd Army Group saw the 1st Army in the Bačka region between the Danube and the Tisza, with formations centred around the towns of Sombor, Bačka Topola and Senta, with the 3rd Cavalry Division held in depth, south of the Danube in the Fruška Gora region. The 2nd Army deployment plan saw it in the Baranya and Slavonia regions between Slatina and the Danube, with its formations positioned south of the Drava from just east of Slatina to Valpovo, and around the towns of Osijek and Vinkovci. The Yugoslav historian Velimir Terzić notes that the army group headquarters and headquarters of both armies were still at their mobilisation centres on 6 April, and describes the mobilisation of all formations of the 1st Army Group on 6 April as "only partial", with 80 to 90 percent of men having reported for duty and between 50 and 70 percent of its establishment strength in animals.

To the right of the 1st Army Group was the 6th Army, an independent formation that was responsible for the defence of the Yugoslav Banat region east of the Tisza. The boundary with the 6th Army ran just to the east of the Tisza to the confluence with the Danube, then south across the Sava through Obrenovac. On the left flank of the 2nd Army Group was the 1st Army Group, which was responsible for the defence of northwestern Yugoslavia, along the Yugoslav–Hungarian border west of Slatina, and the Yugoslav–German and Yugoslav–Italian borders. The army group boundary ran from just east of Slatina through Požega towards Banja Luka.

== Operations ==
The 2nd Army Group faced the Hungarian 3rd Army across the border, and during the first few days after the commencement of the invasion, there were exchanges of fire with Hungarian border guards, but the Yugoslavs faced no direct attacks along the 2nd Army Group sector. Neither the 2nd Army Group nor the Hungarians were ready for full-scale fighting, as they were still mobilising and deploying their forces. While Nedić was located at the projected headquarters in Bijeljina from 6 April, the operations staff of 2nd Army Group didn't arrived there from Sarajevo until 8 April. On 9 April, due to German successes elsewhere in Yugoslavia, the 6th Army on the right flank of the 2nd Army Group was ordered to withdraw south of the Danube and deploy on a line facing east to defend against an attack from the direction of Sofia, Bulgaria. 2nd Army Group also received orders to withdraw south of the line of the Drava and Danube. 1st Army began to withdraw, and on the same day elements were approaching the Danube crossing. The headquarters of the 2nd Army issued orders to evacuate Baranja and reinforce the left flank.

The following day, the situation deteriorated significantly when the German XXXXI Motorised Corps of General der Panzertruppe (Note: Equivalent to a U.S. Army lieutenant general.) Georg-Hans Reinhardt crossed the Yugoslav–Romanian border into the Yugoslav Banat and struck the 6th Army, halting its withdrawal and disrupting its ability to organise a coherent defence behind the Danube. Also on 10 April, the main thrust of General der Panzertruppe Heinrich von Vietinghoff's XXXXVI Motorised Corps of the 2nd Army, consisting of the 8th Panzer Division leading the 16th Motorised Infantry Division, crossed the Drava at Barcs in the 4th Army sector. Generalmajor (Note: Equivalent to a U.S. Army brigadier general.) Walter Neumann-Silkow's 8th Panzer Division turned southeast between the Drava and Sava rivers, and meeting almost no resistance and with strong air support, reached the left flank of the 2nd Army at Slatina by evening, despite poor roads and bad weather.

Later that day, as the situation was becoming increasingly desperate throughout the country, Simović, who was both the Prime Minister and Yugoslav Chief of the General Staff, broadcast the following message:

All troops must engage the enemy wherever encountered and with every means at their disposal. Don't wait for direct orders from above, but act on your own and be guided by your judgement, initiative, and conscience.

— Dušan Simović

The bulk of the 1st Army were able to cross the Danube and began to prepare defences, and the 2nd Army was able to evacuate Baranja and organise a defence of the left flank of the 2nd Army Group, now threatened by the 8th Panzer Division, but Croat reservists began to desert their units, significantly reducing the combat power of the 2nd Army. By the evening of 10 April, the 2nd Army Group was ordered to withdraw from these positions and form a defensive line behind the Sava from Debrc to the confluence with the Vrbas river, for which one or two days would be needed. On the night of 10/11 April, the whole 2nd Army Group continued its withdrawal, but units of the 2nd Army on the left flank of the 1st Army that included significant numbers of Croats began to dissolve due to the fifth column activities of the Ustaše and their sympathisers.

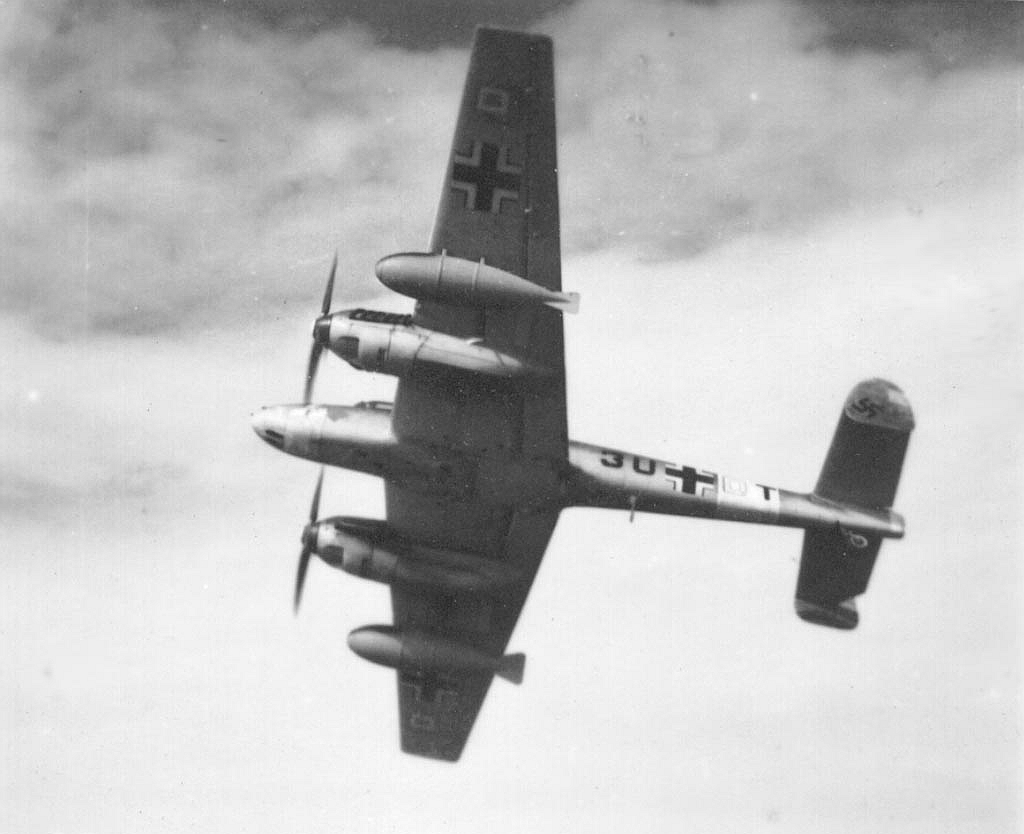
Messerschmitt Bf 110s of Zerstörergeschwader 26 destroyed the air reconnaissance assets of the 2nd Army Group on their airfield at Bijeljina on 12 April

At dawn on 11 April, Hungarian forces, consisting of the Mobile, IV and V Corps of Altábornagy (Note: Equivalent to a U.S. Army lieutenant general.) Elemér Gorondy-Novák's 3rd Army, crossed the Yugoslav border north of Osijek and near Subotica, overcame Yugoslav border guards and advanced on Subotica and Palić. The XXXXVI Motorised Corps continued to push east south of the Drava, with the 8th Panzer Division capturing Našice, Osijek on the Drava, and Vukovar on the Danube, followed by Generalmajor Sigfrid Henrici's 16th Motorised Infantry Division which advanced east of Našice, despite bridge demolitions and poor roads. The 8th Panzer Division had effectively routed the 2nd Army Group by 11 April. On the same day, Messerschmitt Bf 110s of I Group of Zerstörergeschwader 26 (ZG 26) destroyed several 1st Air Reconnaissance Group Breguet 19s at Ruma. The rest were flown to Bijeljina, but all of the air reconnaissance assets of the 2nd Army Group were destroyed the following day when I/ZG 26 swept over the airfield in one of the most effective attacks of the campaign. On the night of 11/12 April, the 8th Panzer Division captured Sremska Mitrovica on the Sava at 02:30, destroyed a bridge over the Danube at Bogojevo, and advanced on Lazarevac about 32 kilometres (20 mi) south of Belgrade. These advances delayed the withdrawal of the 2nd Army Group south of the Sava.

By 12 April, the withdrawal of the 2nd Army Group was being threatened from the left flank, and by this time, according to the Polish historian Andrzej Krzak, 2nd Army had "no combat importance at all". On the right flank, 6th Army attempted to regroup while being pressed by the 11th Panzer Division as it drove towards Belgrade. West of Belgrade, remnants of the 2nd Army Group tried to establish a line along the Sava, but XXXXVI Motorised Corps had already captured the bridges. When elements of the 8th Panzer Division captured Zemun without a fight, they captured 1st Army's rear area units. On 12 April, the 1st Army's 3rd Cavalry Division counter-attacked at Šabac and pushed the Germans back across the Sava. The Hungarians pursued the 1st Army south, and occupied the area between the Danube and the Tisza meeting virtually no resistance. Serb Chetnik irregulars fought isolated engagements, and the Hungarian General Staff considered irregular resistance forces to be their only significant opposition. The Hungarian 1st Parachute Battalion captured canal bridges at Vrbas and Srbobran. This, the first airborne operation in Hungarian history, was not without incident. The battalion's aircraft consisted of five Italian-made Savoia-Marchetti SM.75 transport aircraft formerly belonging to the civilian airline MALERT, but pressed into service with the Royal Hungarian Air Force (Hungarian: Magyar Királyi Honvéd Légierő, MKHL) at the start of the European war. Shortly after takeoff from the airport at Veszprém-Jutas on the afternoon of 12 April, the command plane, code E-101, crashed with the loss of 20 or 23 lives, including 19 paratroopers. This was the heaviest single loss suffered by the Hungarians during the Yugoslav campaign. Meanwhile, Sombor was captured against determined Chetnik resistance, and Subotica was also captured.

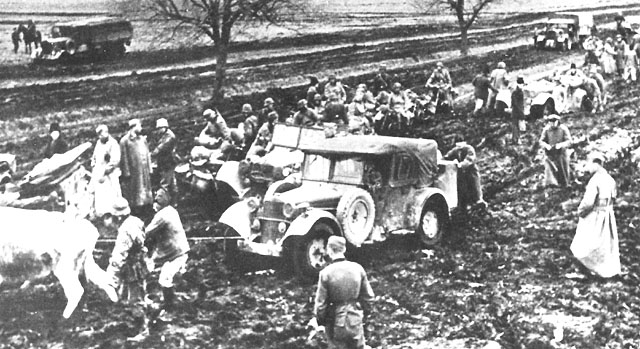
The Germans struggled along poor roads during their drive east towards Belgrade

On the evening of 12 April, elements of the SS Motorised Infantry Division Reich, under command of XXXXI Motorised Corps, crossed the Danube in pneumatic boats and captured Belgrade without resistance. About the same time, most of the elements of XXXXVI Motorised Corps that were approaching Belgrade from the west were redirected away from the capital, but part of the 8th Panzer Division continued their thrust to capture the Sava bridges to the west of Belgrade, and entered the city during the night. The rest of the 8th Panzer Division turned southeast and drove towards Valjevo to link up with the left flank of the First Panzer Group southwest of Belgrade. The 16th Motorised Infantry Division was redirected south across the Sava, and advanced toward Zvornik.

== Fate ==
On 13 April, the Hungarians occupied Baranja without resistance, and pushed south through Bačka to reach the line of Novi Sad and the Great Bačka Canal. Early on 14 April, the remnants of 2nd Army Group continued to fight against the 8th Panzer Division and 16th Motorised Infantry Division along the Sava. On 14 and 15 April, tens of thousands of Yugoslav soldiers were taken prisoner by the Germans during their drive on Sarajevo in the centre of the country, including 30,000 around Zvornik and 6,000 around Doboj. On 15 April, the 8th and 14th Panzer Divisions entered Sarajevo. After a delay in locating appropriate signatories for the surrender document, the Yugoslav High Command unconditionally surrendered in Belgrade effective at 12:00 on 18 April.
