= Dimitrije Živković =

Yugoslav general

General Dimitrije Živković
- Димитрије Живковић
- Military career
- Allegiance: Yugoslavia
- Branch: Royal Yugoslav Army
- Rank: Army general (Kingdom of Yugoslavia)
- Commands: 6th Army
- Conflicts: Invasion of Yugoslavia (1941) (surrendered)

Dimitrije Živković was an Army general (Kingdom of Yugoslavia) in the Royal Yugoslav Army (VKJ) who commanded the 6th Army during the German-led Axis invasion of Yugoslavia of April 1941 during World War II. Živković's command consisted of the Banat, Srem, Dunav, Krajina and Cer Divisions, and the 2nd Cavalry Division. The 6th Army was originally intended to form the strategic reserve for the VKJ. It was deployed around Belgrade and in the Banat region east of the Tisza. It held two infantry divisions in reserve in the lower Morava valley.
