= 2nd Army (Kingdom of Yugoslavia) =

Royal Yugoslav Army formation (1941)

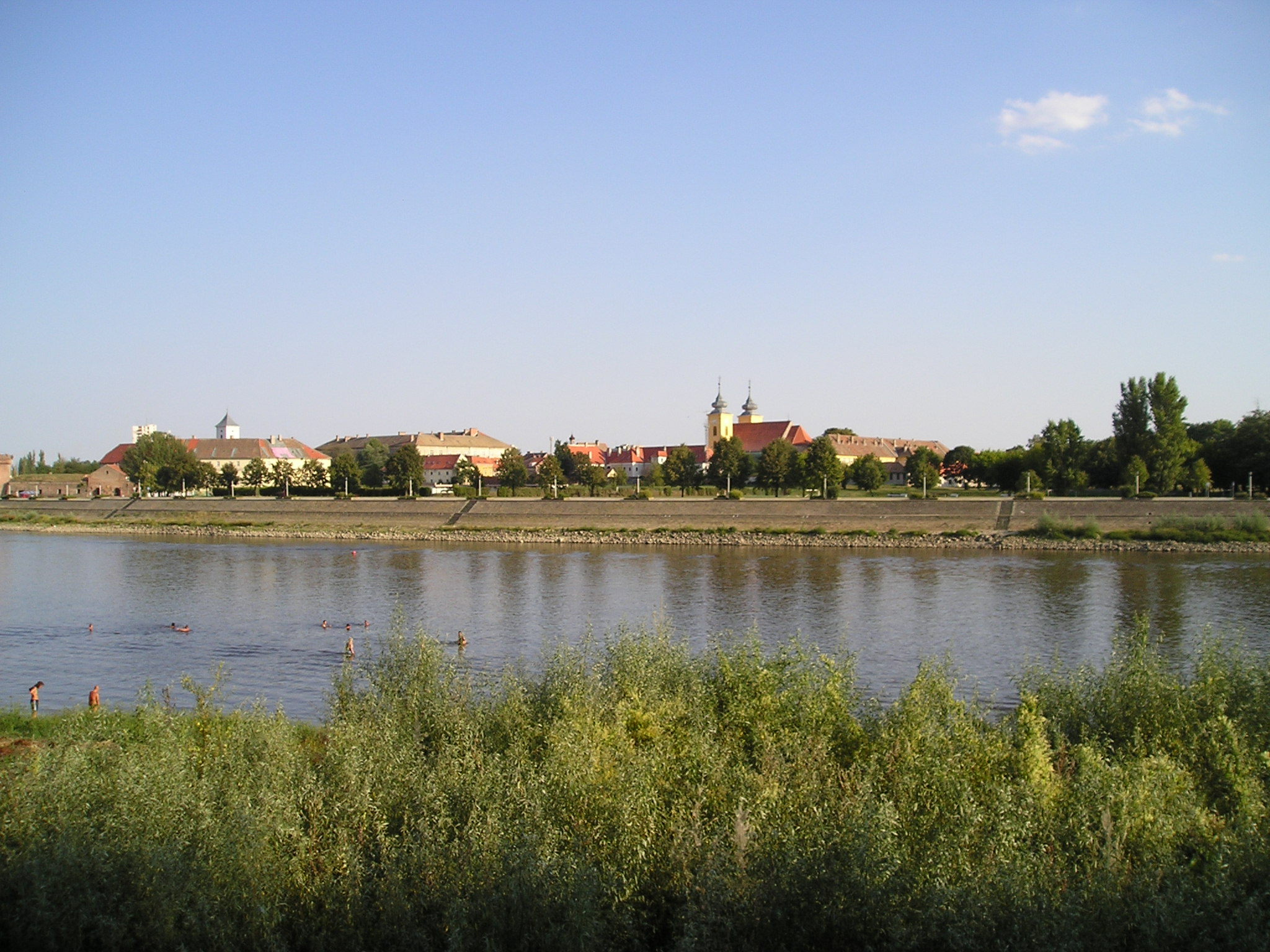
- The 30th Infantry Division Osiječka was deployed astride the Drava river at Osijek
- Country: Kingdom of Yugoslavia
- Branch: Royal Yugoslav Army
- Type: Infantry
- Size: Corps (Note: The Royal Yugoslav Army did not field corps, but their armies consisted of several divisions, and were therefore corps-sized.)
- Part of: 2nd Army Group
- Engagements: Invasion of Yugoslavia (1941)

Commanders
- Notable commanders: Dragoslav Miljković

The 2nd Army (Serbo-Croatian Latin: 2. armija) was a Royal Yugoslav Army formation commanded by Armijski đeneral (Note: Equivalent to a U.S. Army lieutenant general.) Dragoslav Miljković that opposed the German-led Axis invasion of the Kingdom of Yugoslavia in April 1941 during World War II. It consisted of three infantry divisions and one horsed cavalry regiment along with supporting units. It formed part of the 2nd Army Group, and was responsible for the defence of the Yugoslav–Hungarian border along the Drava river from Slatina to the Danube.

The 2nd Army was not directly attacked during the first few days after the invasion commenced, but attacks on its flanks from 10 April resulted in successive orders to withdraw to the lines of the Danube and then the Sava. On 11 April, the Hungarians crossed the border in the sector for which the 2nd Army had been responsible, but the Yugoslavs were already withdrawing and the Hungarians faced almost no resistance. On the same day, the German 8th Panzer Division, driving on Belgrade into the flank of the 2nd Army, had effectively routed the entire 2nd Army Group. The disintegration of the 2nd Army as a combat force was accelerated by fifth column activities and desertion by many of its Croat soldiers. The Germans captured Belgrade on 12 April. Remnants of the 2nd Army continued to resist along the line of the Sava on 14 April, and the headquarters of the 2nd Army was rebuffed when it contacted the Germans in an attempt to negotiate a separate ceasefire. On 14–15 April, tens of thousands of Yugoslav soldiers were captured, including many from the 2nd Army. The Germans closed on Sarajevo, capturing it on 15 April, and accepted the unconditional surrender of Yugoslavia on 17 April, which came into effect at 12:00 the following day.

== Background ==
A map showing the location of Yugoslavia in Europe

The Kingdom of Serbs, Croats and Slovenes was created with the merger of Serbia, Montenegro and the South Slav-inhabited areas of Austria-Hungary on 1 December 1918, in the immediate aftermath of World War I. The Army of the Kingdom of Serbs, Croats and Slovenes was established to defend the new state. It was formed around the nucleus of the victorious Royal Serbian Army, as well as armed formations raised in regions formerly controlled by Austria-Hungary. Many former Austro-Hungarian officers and soldiers became members of the new army. From the beginning, much like other aspects of public life in the new kingdom, the army was dominated by ethnic Serbs, who saw it as a means by which to secure Serb political hegemony.

The army's development was hampered by the kingdom's poor economy, and this continued during the 1920s. In 1929, King Alexander changed the name of the country to the Kingdom of Yugoslavia, at which time the army was renamed the Royal Yugoslav Army (Serbo-Croatian Latin: Vojska Kraljevine Jugoslavije, VKJ). The army budget remained tight, and as tensions rose across Europe during the 1930s, it became difficult to secure weapons and munitions from other countries. Consequently, at the time World War II broke out in September 1939, the VKJ had several serious weaknesses, which included reliance on draught animals for transport, and the large size of its formations. Infantry divisions had a wartime strength of 26,000–27,000 men, as compared to contemporary British infantry divisions of half that strength. These characteristics resulted in slow, unwieldy formations, and the inadequate supply of arms and munitions meant that even the very large Yugoslav formations had low firepower. Generals better suited to the trench warfare of World War I were combined with an army that was neither equipped nor trained to resist the fast-moving combined arms approach used by the Germans in their invasions of Poland and France.

The weaknesses of the VKJ in strategy, structure, equipment, mobility and supply were exacerbated by serious ethnic disunity within Yugoslavia, resulting from two decades of Serb hegemony and the attendant lack of political legitimacy achieved by the central government. Attempts to address the disunity came too late to ensure that the VKJ was a cohesive force. Fifth column activity was also a serious concern, not only from the Croatian nationalist Ustaše but also from the country's Slovene and ethnic German minorities.

== Formation and composition ==
Mobilisation centres and peacetime headquarters of the 2nd Army in blue, with the line of border fortifications in red

=== Peacetime organisation ===
Yugoslav war plans saw the 2nd Army organised and mobilised on a geographic basis from the peacetime 2nd Army District, headquartered in Sarajevo, which was divided into three divisional districts, each of which was subdivided into regimental regions. Slavonski Brod and Tuzla were key centres for the mobilisation and concentration of the 2nd Army due to their good rail infrastructure. Prior to the invasion, some fortifications had been constructed along the Hungarian border within what became the 2nd Army's area of operations. In the Baranya region, an anti-tank ditch, barbed wire entanglements, and medium and small bunkers had been constructed, with the main defensive line running from the Drava River through Beli Manastir to Batina on the Danube River. These defences had only been partially constructed by the time of the invasion, with the intention to complete them once troops had been mobilised.

=== Wartime organisation ===
The 2nd Army was commanded by Armijski đeneral (Note: Equivalent to a U.S. Army lieutenant general.) Dragoslav Miljković, his chief of staff was Brigadni đeneral (Note: Equivalent to a U.S. Army brigadier general.) Bogdan Maglić, and Maglić's deputy was Pukovnik (Note: Equivalent to a U.S. Army colonel.) Draža Mihailović. The 2nd Army consisted of:

- 10th Infantry Division Bosanska (10th ID)
- 17th Infantry Division Vrbaska (17th ID)
- 30th Infantry Division Osiječka (30th ID)
- 76th Cavalry Regiment (horse)

Army-level support was provided by the 76th Artillery Regiment, the 2nd Anti-Aircraft Battalion, and the 2nd Army Anti-Aircraft Company. The 3rd Air Reconnaissance Group comprising sixteen Breguet 19s was attached from the Royal Yugoslav Army Air Force and was based at Staro Topolje just east of Slavonski Brod.

== Deployment plan ==
Planned deployment locations for formations of the 2nd Army
- Army headquarters in blue
- subordinate formations in red
- 33rd ID in green

The 2nd Army was part of the 2nd Army Group, which was responsible for the eastern section of the Yugoslav–Hungarian border, with the 2nd Army in the Slavonia and Baranya regions between Slatina and the Danube, and the 1st Army in the Bačka region between the Danube and the Tisza. On the left flank of the 2nd Army was the 4th Army of the 1st Army Group, which was responsible for the defence of the Yugoslav–Hungarian border west of Slatina. The boundary with the 4th Army ran from just east of Slatina through Požega towards Banja Luka. The boundary with the 1st Army on the right flank of the 2nd Army was the Danube. The Yugoslav defence plan saw the 2nd Army deployed from the boundary with the 4th Army to the Danube, with two divisions along the line of the Drava and one division in reserve. The headquarters of the 2nd Army was to initially be located in Đakovo. The planned deployment of the 2nd Army from west to east was:

- 17th ID around Našice
- 30th ID in the Baranya region behind the border fortifications
- 10th ID in reserve on the right flank behind the Vuka river, centred on Vinkovci

Army-level and rear area troops were to be deployed near Đakovo. The 10th Border Guard Regiment was to man fortifications in the Baranya region, and the 1st Battalion of the 393rd Reserve Regiment was to man defences along the Drava in front of the 17th ID. The 33rd Infantry Division Lička (33rd ID), which was under the direct command of the Supreme Command of the VKJ, was deployed further south behind the Sava river, centred on Doboj.

== Mobilisation ==
After unrelenting pressure from Adolf Hitler, Yugoslavia signed the Tripartite Pact on 25 March 1941. On 27 March, a military coup d'état overthrew the government that had signed the pact, and a new government was formed under the VVKJ commander, Armijski đeneral Dušan Simović. A general mobilisation was not called by the new government until 3 April, out of fear of offending Hitler and thus precipitating war. On the same day as the coup, Hitler issued Führer Directive 25 which called for Yugoslavia to be treated as a hostile state, and on 3 April, Führer Directive 26 was issued, detailing the plan of attack and command structure for the invasion, which was to commence on 6 April.

The Yugoslav historian Velimir Terzić describes the mobilisation of the 2nd Army as a whole on 6 April as "only partial", and states the headquarters of the 2nd Army was mobilising at Kiseljak near Sarajevo, and did not reach Đakovo until 7 April. Of the army-level support units, the 76th Artillery Regiment was mobilising far to the south in Mostar, and was unable to move to its concentration area near Đakovo due to a lack of draught animals.

=== 17th Infantry Division Vrbaska ===
The 17th Infantry Division Vrbaska was still largely located at mobilisation centres in Bosnia, with only the operations branch of the divisional headquarters located in its concentration area in Slavonia. The balance of the division was located as follows:

- the rest of the divisional headquarters was located in Banja Luka
- the 33rd Infantry Regiment, with about 70 percent of its troops, was located at Banja Luka
- the 89th Infantry Regiment was located in Sisak
- the 90th Infantry Regiment, with about 90 percent of its troops, was located in Banja Luka
- the 17th Divisional Infantry Regiment, less its 2nd Battalion, was located in Banja Luka, with its 2nd Battalion located in Caprag
- the 17th Divisional Cavalry Battalion was mobilising in Banja Luka, but had less than five percent of its horses and riding equipment
- the 17th Artillery Regiment, less its 1st and 4th Battalions, was located in Petrinja, the 1st Battalion was in Otočac (and about to join Detachment Lika of the 7th Army), and the 4th Battalion was in Banja Luka

Other divisional units were also mobilising in the Banja Luka area. The 89th Infantry Regiment was ordered to march west to join the 40th Infantry Division Slavonska (40th ID), which was part of the 1st Army Group's 4th Army. The 43rd Infantry Regiment, originally allocated to the 40th ID and with about 75–80 percent of its troops, was marching from its mobilisation centre in Požega towards Našice, but on 6 April had only reached Jakšić, 9 km (5.6 mi) northeast of Požega. Border troops in the planned 17th ID deployment area consisted of the 1st Battalion of the 393rd Reserve Regiment.

=== 30th Infantry Division Osiječka ===
The 30th Infantry Division Osiječka was mainly located in its concentration areas in the Baranya region. The divisional headquarters and other divisional support troops were located in Osijek, and the rest of the division was located as follows:

- the 17th Infantry Regiment had marched from Vinkovci and was arriving in Valpovo
- the 41st Infantry Regiment was in the Beli Manastir area, except for its 1st Battalion, which was already in its planned position
- the 64th Infantry Regiment was in the Osijek area and was moving forward to its planned position
- the 30th Divisional Infantry Regiment was in Čepin, about 10 km (6.2 mi) southwest of Osijek
- the 30th Divisional Cavalry Battalion was Zmajevac, about 15 km (9.3 mi) east of Beli Manastir
- the 30th Artillery Regiment, less its 1st Battalion, was moving from Osijek towards Kozarac, the 1st Battalion was moving with the 17th Infantry Regiment

The units of the division had generally completed mobilisation, with about 80–90 percent of men having reported for duty, but only about 40 percent of animals taken on strength. Border troops in the planned 30th ID deployment area consisted of the 10th Border Guard Regiment.

=== 10th Infantry Division Bosanska ===
The 10th Infantry Division Bosanska had largely completed mobilisation in Bosnia. The divisional headquarters and other divisional support troops were located in Sarajevo, and the rest of the division was located as follows:

- the 10th Infantry Regiment was in Sarajevo
- the 27th Infantry Regiment was in Travnik
- the 60th Infantry Regiment was Derventa, preparing to march towards Vinkovci
- the 10th Divisional Infantry Regiment, less its 2nd Battalion, was located near Sarajevo, its 2nd Battalion was located in Travnik
- the 316th Reserve Army Regiment, with 90 percent of its troops, was located near Sarajevo
- the 10th Artillery Regiment, with 85 percent of its troops and 75 percent of its animals, was near Ilidža close to Sarajevo
- the 10th Divisional Cavalry Battalion was located in Ilidža

The 60th Infantry Regiment only had one-third of its strength in weapons, animals and equipment, it was given the task of supplying ammunition to the rest of the Army. Some other units lacked weapons and other items of equipment, despite there being stocks held in warehouses. Those providing the animals and fodder provided only the poorest material to the 2nd Army. The division was to move to its concentration area around Vinkovci as the reserve force for the 2nd Army.

=== Overall condition of the 2nd Army ===
The 2nd Army, with the exception of the 30th ID, was still mobilising in Bosnia on 6 April. About 80 to 90 percent of troops had reported for mobilisation, and units had 60 percent of the animals they needed to be at full strength. The 30th ID had completed its mobilisation and concentration according to the war plans, and was ready for action.

== Operations ==
By the end of 6 April, the 30th ID held positions in Baranya on the line Batina—Beli Manastir—Drava, with its strongest flank on the left, closest to the Drava. As the 17th ID had not yet arrived in its planned deployment locations, the 1st Battalion of the 43rd Infantry Regiment was initially the only unit in the divisional area, supported by the 1st Battalion of the 30th Artillery Regiment. The 2nd Army faced the Hungarian 3rd Army, and on 7 April Hungarian forces could be seen massing across the border. During the first few days after the commencement of the invasion, there were exchanges of fire with Hungarian border guards, but the 2nd Army faced no direct attacks. Neither the 2nd Army nor the Hungarians were ready for full-scale fighting, as they were still mobilising and deploying their forces. On 7 April, 2nd Army headquarters arrived in Đakovo and issued orders to its subordinate formations. On the left, the 43rd Infantry Regiment and border units remained the only fighting formations yet deployed along the Drava. In Baranya, the 30th ID was deployed with the 41st Infantry Regiment on the left, the 10th Infantry Regiment on the right, and the 64th Infantry Regiment in reserve, with supporting artillery distributed among the infantry formations. The 30th Divisional Cavalry Battalion was located in Kneževi Vinogradi, 11 kilometres (6.8 mi) southeast of Beli Manastir.

On 9 April, due to events in other parts of Yugoslavia, the 6th Army on the right flank of the 2nd Army Group was ordered to withdraw south of the Danube and deploy on a line facing east to defend against an attack from the direction of Sofia, Bulgaria. The headquarters of the 2nd Army issued orders to evacuate Baranja and reinforce the left flank.

The following day, the situation deteriorated significantly when General der Panzertruppe Georg-Hans Reinhardt's XXXXI Motorised Corps of the German 12th Army crossed the Yugoslav–Romanian border into the Yugoslav Banat and struck the 6th Army, halting its withdrawal and disrupting its ability to organise a coherent defence behind the Danube. Also on 10 April, the main thrust of General der Panzertruppe Heinrich von Vietinghoff's XXXXVI Motorised Corps of the 2nd Army, consisting of the 8th Panzer Division leading the 16th Motorised Infantry Division crossed the Drava at Barcs in the 4th Army sector on the left of the 2nd Army. Generalmajor Walter Neumann-Silkow's 8th Panzer Division turned southeast between the Drava and Sava rivers, and meeting almost no resistance and with strong air support, had reached the left flank of the 2nd Army at Slatina by evening, despite poor roads and bad weather.

Later that day, as the situation was becoming increasingly desperate throughout the country, Simović, who was both the Prime Minister and Yugoslav Chief of the General Staff, broadcast the following message:

All troops must engage the enemy wherever encountered and with every means at their disposal. Don't wait for direct orders from above, but act on your own and be guided by your judgement, initiative, and conscience.

— Dušan Simović

The 2nd Army was able to evacuate Baranja and organised a defence of the left flank of the 2nd Army Group, now threatened by the 8th Panzer Division, but Croat reservists began to desert their units due to the fifth column activities of the fascist Ustaše and their sympathisers. This significantly reducing the combat power of the 2nd Army. By the evening of 10 April, the 2nd Army Group was ordered to withdraw from this line and form a defensive line behind the Sava, from Debrc to the confluence with the Vrbas river, for which one or two days would be needed. On the night of 10/11 April, the whole 2nd Army Group continued its withdrawal, but units of the 2nd Army that included significant numbers of Croats began to dissolve.

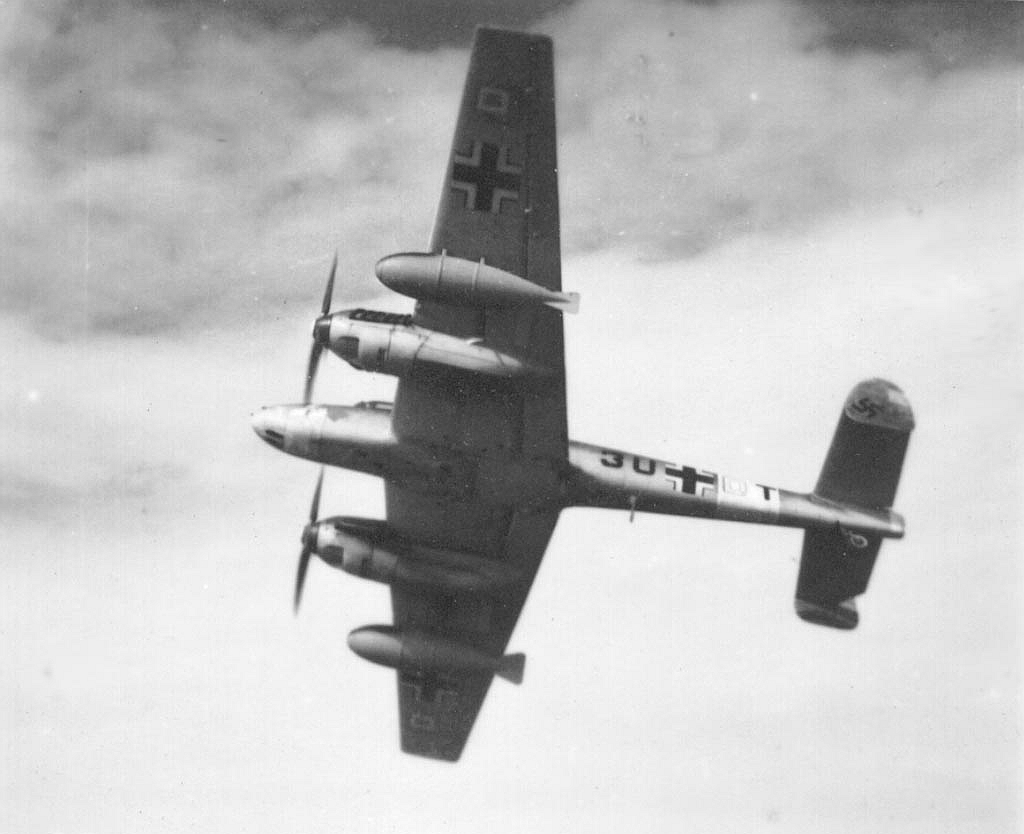
Messerschmitt Bf 110s of Zerstörergeschwader 26 destroyed the air reconnaissance assets of the 2nd Army at Bijeljina on 12 April

At dawn on 11 April, Hungarian forces, consisting of the Mobile, IV and V Corps of Vezérezredes (Note: Equivalent to a U.S. Army lieutenant general.) Elemér Gorondy-Novák's 3rd Army, crossed the Yugoslav border north of Osijek and near Subotica, overcame Yugoslav border guards and advanced on Subotica and Palić. The XXXXVI Motorised Corps continued to push east south of the Drava, with the 8th Panzer Division capturing Našice, Osijek on the Drava, and Vukovar on the Danube, followed by Generalmajor Sigfrid Henrici's 16th Motorised Infantry Division which advanced east of Našice, despite bridge demolitions and poor roads. The 8th Panzer Division had effectively routed the 2nd Army Group by 11 April. On the same day, the 3rd Air Reconnaissance Group Breguet 19s were flown from Staro Topolje to Bijeljina. The following day, Messerschmitt Bf 110s of I Group of the 26th Heavy Fighter Wing (German: Zerstörergeschwader 26, ZG 26) destroyed the 3rd Air Reconnaissance Group aircraft when they swept over the airfield in one of the most effective attacks of the campaign. On the night of 11/12 April, the 8th Panzer Division captured Sremska Mitrovica on the Sava at 02:30, after two important bridges over the Sava were captured intact. The 8th Panzer Division then destroyed a bridge over the Danube at Bogojevo, and advanced on Lazarevac about 32 kilometres (20 mi) south of Belgrade. These advances delayed the withdrawal of the 2nd Army Group south of the Sava.

== Fate ==
By 12 April, the withdrawal of the 2nd Army Group was being threatened from the left flank, with 2nd Army being described by the Polish historian Andrzej Krzak as having "no combat importance at all". On the far right flank, 6th Army attempted to regroup while being pressed by the 11th Panzer Division as it drove towards Belgrade. West of Belgrade, remnants of the 2nd Army Group tried to establish a line along the Sava, but XXXXVI Motorised Corps had already captured the bridges. Elements of the 8th Panzer Division captured Zemun without a fight. On 12 April, the 1st Army's 3rd Cavalry Division counter-attacked on the right flank of the 2nd Army at Šabac and pushed the Germans back across the Sava. The Ustaše had captured Slavonski Brod without German assistance, but 2nd Army units recaptured the town and destroyed the bridge over the Sava. The Hungarians occupied Baranja without facing resistance.

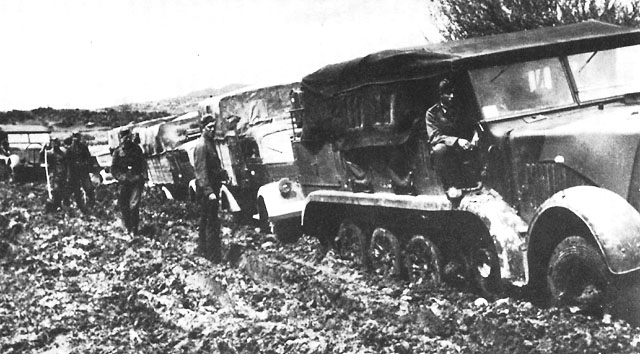
The 8th Panzer Division and 16th Motorised Infantry Division struggled along poor roads during their drive into the left flank of the 2nd Army on their way to Belgrade

On the evening of 12 April, elements of SS-Gruppenführer und Generalleutnant der Waffen-SS (Note: Equivalent to a U.S. Army major general.) Paul Hausser's SS Motorised Infantry Division Reich, under command of XXXXI Motorised Corps crossed the Danube in pneumatic boats and captured Belgrade without resistance. About the same time, most of the elements of XXXXVI Motorised Corps that were approaching Belgrade from the west were redirected away from the capital, but part of the 8th Panzer Division continued their thrust to capture the Sava bridges to the west of Belgrade, and entered the city during the night. The rest of the 8th Panzer Division turned southeast and drove towards Valjevo to link up with the left flank of the First Panzer Group southwest of Belgrade. The 16th Motorised Infantry Division was redirected south across the Sava, and advanced toward Zvornik.

On 13 and 14 April, the 8th Panzer Division led a southward thrust towards Sarajevo, where both the Yugoslav Supreme Command and the headquarters of the 2nd Army were located, and during that day the 2nd Army asked the Germans for a separate ceasefire agreement, but were rebuffed, as by this stage only the unconditional surrender of the whole Yugoslav Army would be considered by the Germans. On 14 and 15 April, tens of thousands of Yugoslav soldiers were taken prisoner by the Germans during their drive on Sarajevo in the centre of the country, including 30,000 around Zvornik and 6,000 around Doboj. On 15 April, the 8th Panzer Division approached Sarajevo from the east as the 14th Panzer Division entered it from the west, and the 2nd Army surrendered. After a delay in locating appropriate signatories for the surrender document, the Yugoslav Supreme Command unconditionally surrendered in Belgrade effective at 12:00 on 18 April.
