= Staro Topolje =

Coordinates: 45°11′N 18°15′E

- Village
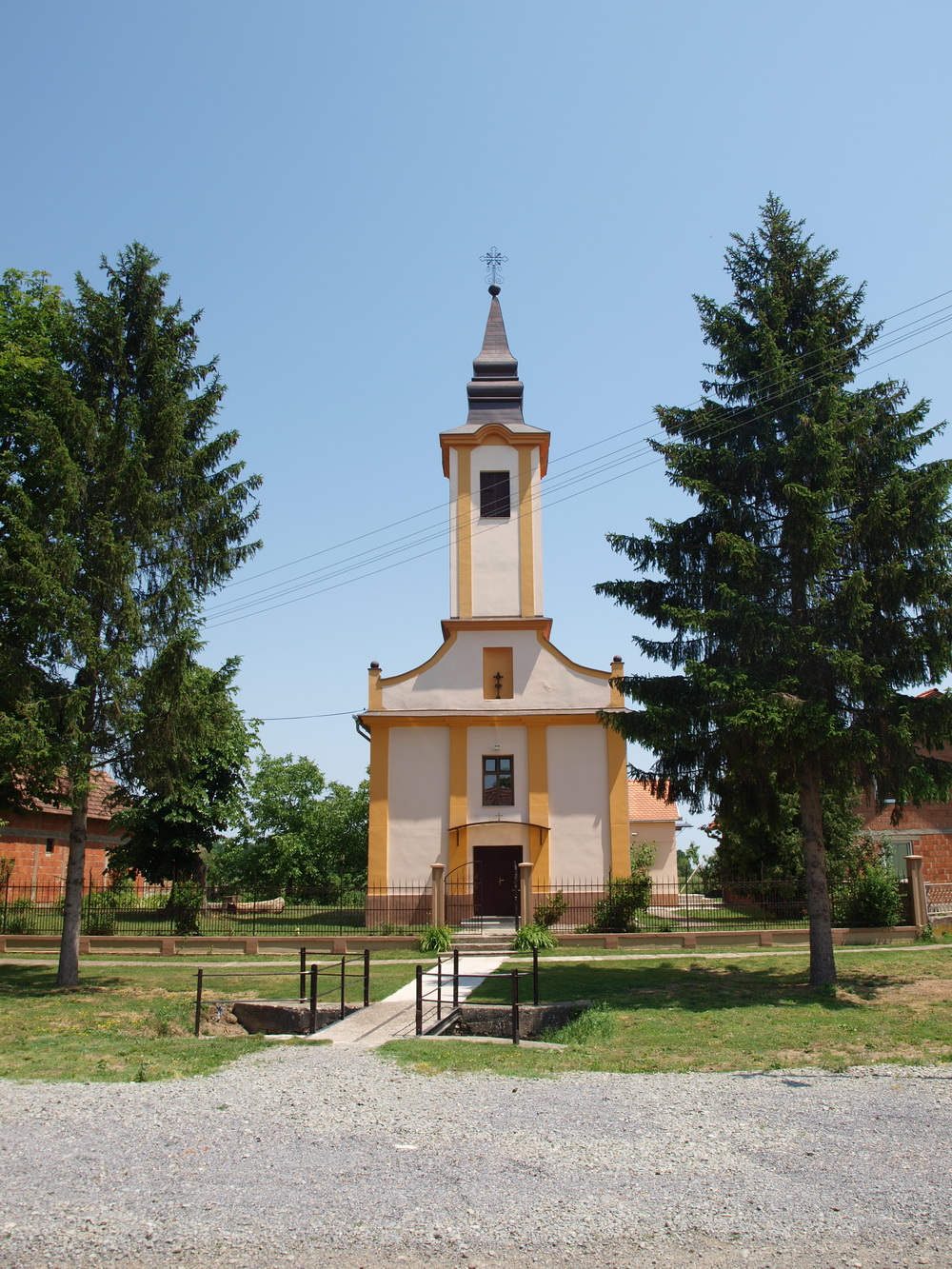
- Interactive map of Staro Topolje
- Country: Croatia
- County: Brod-Posavina County

Area
  - Total: 11.2 km^{2} (4.3 sq mi)

Population (2021)
  - Total: 577
  - Density: 51.5/km^{2} (133/sq mi)
- Time zone: UTC+1 (CET)
  - Summer (DST): UTC+2 (CEST)

Staro Topolje is a village in Croatia.
