= 1st Army (Kingdom of Yugoslavia) =

Royal Yugoslav Army formation

- Country: Yugoslavia
- Branch: Royal Yugoslav Army
- Type: Infantry
- Size: Corps (Note: The Royal Yugoslav Army did not field corps, but their armies consisted of several divisions, and were therefore corps-sized.)
- Part of: 2nd Army Group
- Engagements: Invasion of Yugoslavia (1941)

Commanders
- Notable commanders: Milan Rađenković

The 1st Army was a Royal Yugoslav Army formation commanded by Armijski đeneral Milan Rađenković during the German-led Axis invasion of the Kingdom of Yugoslavia in April 1941 during World War II. It consisted of one infantry division, one horsed cavalry division, and two brigade-strength infantry detachments. It formed part of the 2nd Army Group, and was responsible for the defence of the section of the Yugoslav-Hungarian border between the Danube and the Tisza rivers.

The 1st Army was not directly attacked during the first few days after the invasion commenced, but attacks on its flanks resulted in successive orders to withdraw to the lines of the Danube and then the Sava. The Hungarians then crossed the border in the sector for which the 1st Army had been responsible, but the Yugoslavs were already withdrawing and the Hungarians faced almost no resistance. This was followed by the German capture of Belgrade and the rear area units of 1st Army. Remnants of the 1st Army continued to resist along the line of the Sava, within days, tens of thousands of Yugoslav soldiers had been captured. The Germans closed on Sarajevo, and accepted the unconditional surrender of the Royal Yugoslav Army on 17 April, which came into effect at the following day.

== Background ==
A map showing the location of Yugoslavia in Europe

The Kingdom of Serbs, Croats and Slovenes was created with the merger of Serbia, Montenegro and the South Slav-inhabited areas of Austria-Hungary on 1 December 1918, in the immediate aftermath of World War I. The Army of the Kingdom of Serbs, Croats and Slovenes was established to defend the new state. It was formed around the nucleus of the victorious Royal Serbian Army, as well as armed formations raised in regions formerly controlled by Austria-Hungary. Many former Austro-Hungarian officers and soldiers became members of the new army. From the beginning, much like other aspects of public life in the new kingdom, the army was dominated by ethnic Serbs, who saw it as a means by which to secure Serb political hegemony.

The army's development was hampered by the kingdom's poor economy, and this continued during the 1920s. In 1929, King Alexander changed the name of the country to the Kingdom of Yugoslavia, at which time the army was renamed the Royal Yugoslav Army (Serbo-Croatian Latin: Vojska Kraljevine Jugoslavije, VKJ). The army budget remained tight, and as tensions rose across Europe during the 1930s, it became difficult to secure weapons and munitions from other countries. Consequently, at the time World War II broke out in September 1939, the VKJ had several serious weaknesses, which included reliance on draught animals for transport, and the large size of its formations. Infantry divisions had a wartime strength of 26,000–27,000 men, as compared to contemporary British infantry divisions of half that strength. These characteristics resulted in slow, unwieldy formations, and the inadequate supply of arms and munitions meant that even the very large Yugoslav formations had low firepower. Generals better suited to the trench warfare of World War I were combined with an army that was neither equipped nor trained to resist the fast-moving combined arms approach used by the Germans in their invasions of Poland and France.

The weaknesses of the VKJ in strategy, structure, equipment, mobility and supply were exacerbated by serious ethnic disunity within Yugoslavia, resulting from two decades of Serb hegemony and the attendant lack of political legitimacy achieved by the central government. Attempts to address the disunity came too late to ensure that the VKJ was a cohesive force. Fifth column activity was also a serious concern, not only from the Croatian nationalist Ustaše but also from the country's Slovene and ethnic German minorities.

== Composition ==
The 1st Army was commanded by Armijski đeneral (Note: Armijski đeneral was equivalent to a United States lieutenant general.) Milan Rađenković, and his chief of staff was Brigadni đeneral (Note: Brigadni đeneral was equivalent to a United States brigadier general.) Todor Milićević. It was organised and mobilised on a geographic basis from the 1st Army District, which was divided into divisional districts, each of which was subdivided into regimental regions. The 1st Army consisted of:

- 7th Infantry Division Potiska
- 3rd Cavalry Division
- Infantry Detachment Senta (brigade-strength)
- Infantry Detachment Sombor (brigade-strength)

Its support units included the 56th Army Artillery Regiment, the 1st Anti-Aircraft Battalion, and the 1st Army Anti-Aircraft Company. The 1st Air Reconnaissance Group comprising fifteen Breguet 19s was attached from the Royal Yugoslav Air Force and was based at Ruma just south of Novi Sad.

== Deployment ==
Main deployment areas of the 1st Army, with the location of Belgrade highlighted.

The 1st Army was part of the 2nd Army Group, which was responsible for the eastern section of the Yugoslav-Hungarian border, with the 1st Army deployed in the Bačka region between the Danube and the Tisza, and the 2nd Army in the Baranya and Slavonia regions between Slatina and the Danube. On the right flank of the 1st Army was the 6th Army, an independent formation that was responsible for the defence of the Yugoslav Banat region east of the Tisza. The boundary with the 2nd Army ran just east of the Danube to Vukovar, then south towards Bijeljina. The boundary with the 6th Army ran just to the east of the Tisza to the confluence with the Danube, then south across the Sava through Obrenovac. The Yugoslav defence plan saw the 1st Army deployed with one division forward with an infantry detachment on each flank, and a cavalry division held in depth. The deployment of the 1st Army from west to east was:

- Infantry Detachment Sombor around Sombor
- 7th Infantry Division Potiska centred on Bačka Topola with its forward elements in Subotica
- Infantry Detachment Senta around Senta
- 3rd Cavalry Division south of the Danube in the Fruška Gora region between Novi Sad and Sremska Mitrovica

The 44th Infantry Division Unska, which was under the direct command of the General Headquarters of the VKJ, was deployed in the 1st Army area to the east of the 3rd Cavalry Division, centred on Stara Pazova on the road between Novi Sad and Belgrade.

== Operations ==
=== 6–10 April ===
The 1st Army faced the Hungarian 3rd Army, and during the first few days after the commencement of the invasion, there were exchanges of fire with Hungarian border guards, but the 1st Army faced no direct attacks. Neither the 1st Army or the Hungarians were ready for full-scale fighting, as they were still mobilising and deploying their forces. On 9 April, due to events in other parts of Yugoslavia, the 6th Army on the right flank of the 1st Army was ordered to withdraw south of the Danube and deploy on a line facing east to defend against an attack from the direction of Sofia, Bulgaria. 2nd Army Group also received orders to withdraw south of the line of the Drava and Danube. 1st Army began to withdraw, and on the same day elements were approaching the Danube crossing.

The following day, the situation deteriorated significantly when the German XLI Motorised Corps crossed the Yugoslav-Romanian border into the Yugoslav Banat and struck the 6th Army, halting its withdrawal and disrupting its ability to organise a coherent defence behind the Danube. Also on 10 April, the main thrust of the XLVI Motorised Corps of the 2nd Army, consisting of the 8th Panzer Division leading the 16th Motorised Infantry Division crossed the Drava at Barcs in the 4th Army sector. The 8th Panzer Division turned southeast between the Drava and Sava rivers, and meeting almost no resistance and with strong air support, had reached Slatina by evening, despite poor roads and bad weather.

Later that day, as the situation was becoming increasingly desperate throughout the country, Dušan Simović, who was both the Prime Minister and Yugoslav Chief of the General Staff, broadcast the following message:

All troops must engage the enemy wherever encountered and with every means at their disposal. Don't wait for direct orders from above, but act on your own and be guided by your judgement, initiative, and conscience.

— Dušan Simović

The bulk of the 1st Army were able to cross the Danube and began to prepare defences. By the evening of 10 April, the 1st Army was ordered to withdraw from this line and form a defensive line behind the Sava from Debrc to the confluence with the Vrbas river, for which one or two days would be needed. On the night of 10/11 April, the whole 2nd Army Group continued its withdrawal, but units of the 2nd Army on the left flank of the 1st Army that included significant numbers of Croats began to dissolve due to the fifth column activities of the fascist Ustaše and their sympathisers.

=== 11–12 April ===
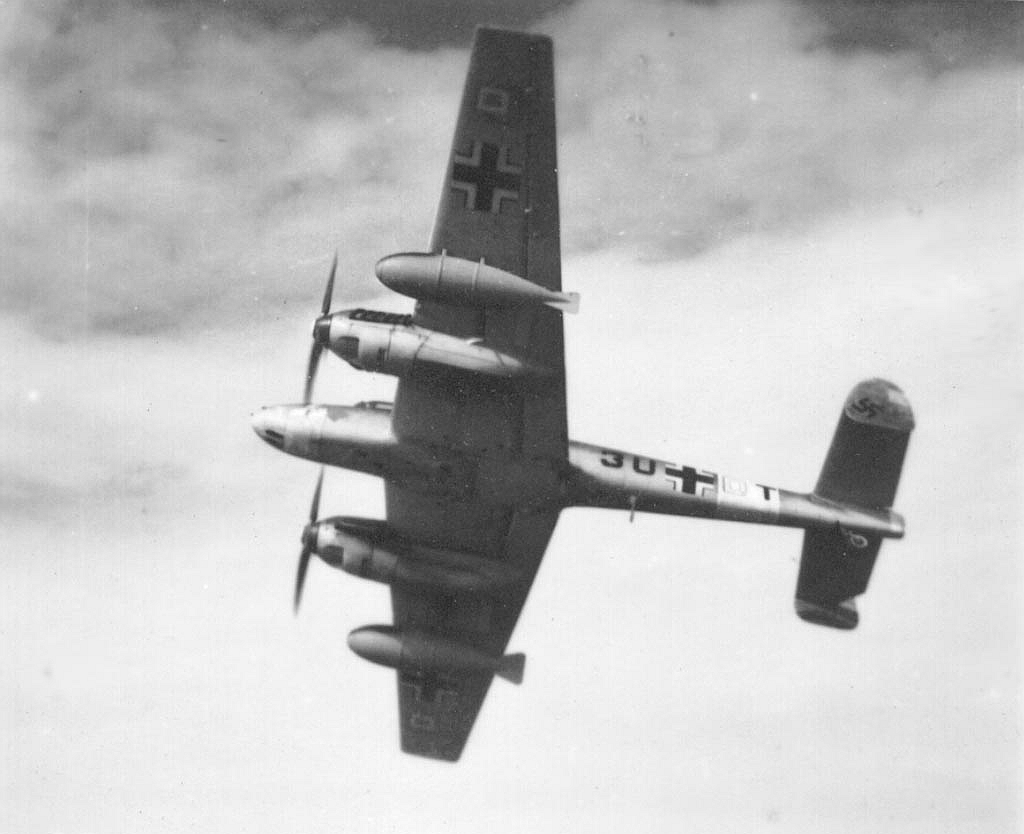
Messerschmitt Bf 110's of Zerstörergeschwader 26 destroyed the air reconnaissance assets of the 1st Army on their airfields over successive days

At dawn on 11 April, Hungarian forces, consisting with the Mobile, IV and V Corps of Vezérezredes (Lieutenant General) Elemér Gorondy-Novák's 3rd Army, crossed the Yugoslav border north of Osijek and near Subotica, overcame Yugoslav border guards and advanced on Subotica and Palić. The XLVI Motorised Corps continued to push east south of the Drava, with the 8th Panzer Division capturing Našice, Osijek on the Drava, and Vukovar on the Danube, followed by the 16th Motorised Infantry Division which advanced east of Našice, despite bridge demolitions and poor roads. The 8th Panzer Division had effectively routed the 2nd Army Group by 11 April. On the same day, Messerschmitt Bf 110's of I Group of the 26th Heavy Fighter Wing (German: Zerstörergeschwader 26, ZG 26) destroyed several 1st Air Reconnaissance Group Breguet 19s at Ruma. The rest were flown to Bijeljina, but were destroyed the following day when I/ZG 26 swept over the airfield in one of the most effective attacks of the campaign. On the night of 11/12 April, the 8th Panzer Division captured Sremska Mitrovica on the Sava at 02:30, destroyed a bridge over the Danube at Bogojevo, and advanced on Lazarevac about 32 kilometres (20 mi) south of Belgrade. These advances delayed the withdrawal of the 2nd Army Group south of the Sava.

By 12 April, the withdrawal of the 2nd Army Group was being threatened from the left flank, with 2nd Army having "no combat importance at all". On the right flank, 6th Army attempted to regroup while being pressed by the 11th Panzer Division as it drove towards Belgrade. West of Belgrade, remnants of the 2nd Army Group tried to establish a line along the Sava, but XLVI Motorised Corps had already captured the bridges. When elements of the 8th Panzer Division captured Zemun without a fight, they captured 1st Army's rear area units. On 12 April, the 1st Army's 3rd Cavalry Division counter-attacked at Šabac and pushed the Germans back across the Sava. The Hungarians pursued the 1st Army south, and occupied the area between the Danube and the Tisza meeting virtually no resistance. Serb Chetnik irregulars fought isolated engagements, and the Hungarian General Staff considered irregular resistance forces to be their only significant opposition. The Hungarian 1st Parachute Battalion captured canal bridges at Vrbas and Srbobran. This, the first airborne operation in Hungarian history, was not without incident. The battalion's aircraft consisted of five Italian-made Savoia-Marchetti SM.75 transport aircraft formerly with the civilian airline MALERT, but pressed into service with the Royal Hungarian Air Force (Hungarian: Magyar Királyi Honvéd Légierő, MKHL) at the start of the European war. Shortly after takeoff from the airport at Veszprém-Jutas on the afternoon of 12 April, the command plane, code E-101, crashed with the loss of 20 or 23 lives, including 19 paratroopers. This was the heaviest single loss suffered by the Hungarians during the Yugoslav campaign. Meanwhile, Sombor was captured against determined Chetnik resistance, and Subotica was also captured.

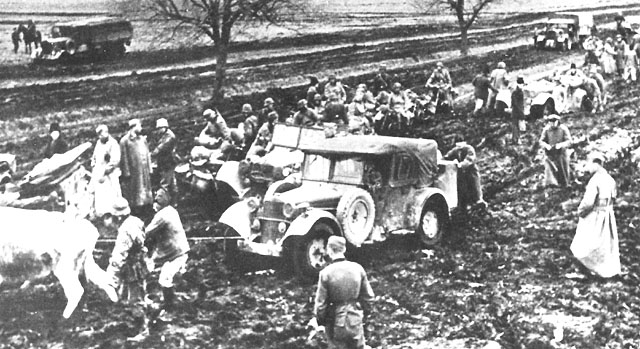
The Germans struggled along poor roads during their drive east towards Belgrade

On the evening of 12 April, elements of the SS Motorised Infantry Division Reich, under command of XLI Motorised Corps crossed the Danube in pneumatic boats and captured Belgrade without resistance. About the same time, most of the elements of XLVI Motorised Corps that were approaching Belgrade from the west were redirected away from the capital. Elements of the 8th Panzer Division did continue their thrust to capture the Sava bridges to the west of Belgrade, and entered the city during the night. The rest of the 8th Panzer Division turned southeast and drove towards Valjevo to link up with the left flank of the First Panzer Group southwest of Belgrade. The 16th Motorised Infantry Division was redirected south across the Sava, and advanced toward Zvornik.

== Fate ==
On 13 April, the Hungarians occupied Baranja without resistance, and pushed south through Bačka to reach the line of Novi Sad and the Great Bačka Canal. Early on 14 April, the remnants of 2nd Army Group, including the 1st Army, continued to fight against the 8th Panzer Division and 16th Motorised Infantry Division along the Sava. On 14 and 15 April, tens of thousands of Yugoslav soldiers were taken prisoner by the Germans during their drive on Sarajevo in the centre of the country, including 30,000 around Zvornik and 6,000 around Doboj. On 15 April, the 8th and 14th Panzer Divisions entered Sarajevo. After a delay in locating appropriate signatories for the surrender document, the Yugoslav High Command unconditionally surrendered in Belgrade effective at 12:00 on 18 April.
