= Milan Rađenković =

Yugoslav general

General Milan Rađenković
- Милан Рађенковић
- Military career
- Allegiance: Yugoslavia
- Branch: Royal Yugoslav Army
- Rank: Army general (Kingdom of Yugoslavia)
- Commands: 1st Army
- Conflicts: Invasion of Yugoslavia (1941)

Milan Rađenković was an Army general (Kingdom of Yugoslavia) in the Royal Yugoslav Army who commanded the 1st Army during the German-led Axis invasion of Yugoslavia of April 1941 during World War II. Rađenković's command consisted of the Potisje, Senta and Sombor Divisions and the 3rd Cavalry Division. The 1st Army was responsible for the area between the Danube and the Tisza.
