= Dragoslav Miljković =

Yugoslav general (1883–1953)

General Dragoslav Miljković
- Драгослав Миљковић
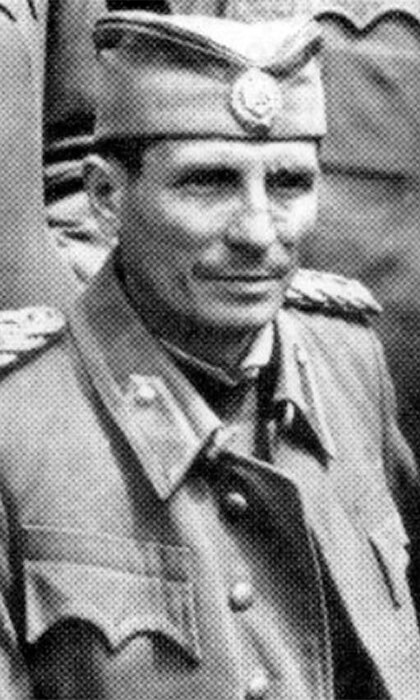
- A picture of Dragoslav Miljković
- Born: January 23, 1883
- Died: May 24, 1953 (aged 70)
- Military career
- Allegiance: Yugoslavia
- Branch: Royal Yugoslav Army
- Rank: Army general (Kingdom of Yugoslavia)
- Commands: 2nd Army
- Conflicts: Invasion of Yugoslavia (1941)

Dragoslav Miljković (Cyrillic: Драгослав Миљковић, 23 January 1883 – 24 May 1953) was an Army general (Kingdom of Yugoslavia) in the Royal Yugoslav Army who commanded the 2nd Army during the German-led Axis invasion of Yugoslavia of April 1941 during World War II.

== Biography ==
Miljković's command consisted of the 10th Infantry Division Bosanska, 17th Infantry Division Vrbaska and 30th Infantry Division Osiječka. The 2nd Army was responsible for the border from Slatina to the Danube.

He was captured by the Germans and taken to a prison camp.
He was the head of the prison camp in Osnabrück, where he fell ill and spent half a year in the camp hospital.
He returned to his home country after liberation. The new communist authorities sentenced him to 3 years in prison with forced labor.

He died on May 24, 1953, in Belgrade.
