= 6th Army (Kingdom of Yugoslavia) =

The 6th Army was a Royal Yugoslav Army formation which commanded six divisions during the German-led Axis invasion of the Kingdom of Yugoslavia in April 1941 during World War II. It was commanded by General Dimitrije Živković, and it was deployed around Belgrade and in the Banat region east of the Tisza . It held two infantry divisions in reserve in the lower Morava valley.
