= Milan Nedić =

Serbian general, politician, and Nazi collaborator (1878–1946)

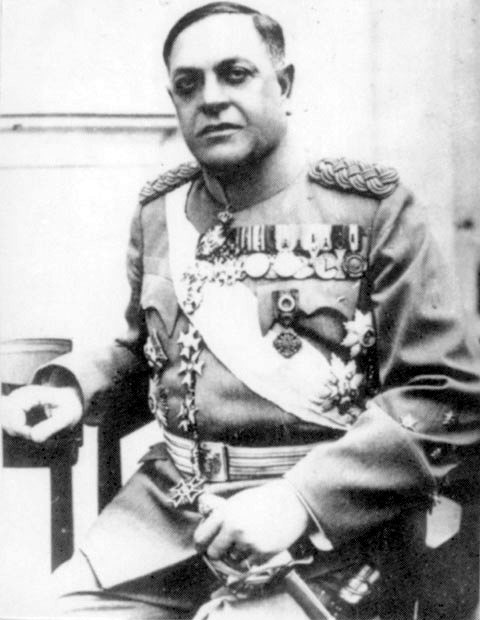
- Official portrait, 1939

Prime Minister of the Government of National Salvation
- In office 29 August 1941 – 4 October 1944
- Preceded by: Office established
- Succeeded by: Office abolished

Minister of Interior of the Government of National Salvation
- In office 5 November 1943 – 4 October 1944
- Prime Minister: Himself
- Preceded by: Tanasije Dinić
- Succeeded by: Office abolished

Minister of the Army and Navy of the Kingdom of Yugoslavia
- In office 26 August 1939 – 6 November 1940
- Monarch: Peter II
- Prime Minister: Dragiša Cvetković
- Regent: Paul
- Preceded by: Milutin Nedić
- Succeeded by: Petar Pešić (acting)

Chief of the General Staff of the Royal Yugoslav Armed Forces
- In office 1 June 1934 – 9 March 1935
- Monarchs: Alexander I Peter II
- Prime Minister: Nikola Uzunović; Bogoljub Jevtić
- Regent: Paul
- Preceded by: Petar Kosić (acting)
- Succeeded by: Petar Kosić (acting)

Personal details
- Born: 2 September 1878 Grocka, Principality of Serbia
- Died: 4 February 1946 (aged 67) Belgrade, PR Serbia, FPR Yugoslavia
- Cause of death: suicide by jumping from height (officially)
- Resting place: Unknown
- Spouse: Živka Pešić
- Children: 5
- Relatives: Milutin Nedić (brother); Dimitrije Ljotić (cousin); Stanislav Krakov (Nephew)
- Education: Military Academy

Military service
- Allegiance: Kingdom of Serbia (1904–1918); Kingdom of Yugoslavia (1918–1941); Nazi Germany (1941–1945); Government of National Salvation (1941–1945) As puppet
- Branch/service: Royal Serbian Army; Royal Yugoslav Army
- Years of service: 1904–1941
- Rank: Army general
- Commands: 3rd Army Group
- Battles/wars: Balkan Wars; World War I; Serbian army's retreat through Albania; World War II in Yugoslavia; Invasion of Yugoslavia
- Awards: Albanian Commemorative Medal

Milan Nedić (Serbian Cyrillic: Милан Недић; 2 September 1878 – 4 February 1946) was a Yugoslav and Serbian army general and politician who served as the Chief of the General Staff of the Royal Yugoslav Army and minister of war in the Royal Yugoslav Government. During World War II, he collaborated with Nazi Germany and served as the prime minister of the puppet government of National Salvation, in the German occupied territory of Serbia. After the war, the Yugoslav communist authorities imprisoned him, where in 1946, according to the official version, he committed suicide. There have been attempts since the 1990s to present Nedić's role in World War II more positively. All applications to rehabilitate him have so far been declined by the official Serbian courts.

== Early life ==
Milan Nedić was born in the Belgrade suburb of Grocka on 2 September 1878 to Đorđe and Pelagia Nedić. His father was a local district chief and his mother was a teacher from a village near Mount Kosmaj. She was the granddaughter of Nikola Mihailović, who was mentioned in the writings of poet Sima Milutinović Sarajlija and was an ally of Serbian revolutionary leader Karađorđe. The Nedić family was originally from the village of Zaoka, near Lazarevac. It traced its origins to two brothers, Damjan and Gligorije, who defended the Čokešina Monastery from the Turks during the Serbian Revolution. The family received its name from Nedić's great-grandmother, Neda, who was a member of the Vasojevići tribe from modern-day Montenegro.

== Military and political career ==
Nedić finished gymnasium in Kragujevac in 1895 and entered the lower level of the Military Academy in Belgrade that year. In 1904, he completed the upper level of the academy, then the General Staff preparatory, and was commissioned into the Serbian Army. In 1910, he was promoted to the rank of major. He fought with the Serbian Army during the Balkan Wars, and received multiple decorations for bravery. In 1913, he was promoted to the rank of lieutenant colonel. He served with the Serbian Army during World War I and was involved in rearguard actions during its retreat through Albania in the winter of 1915. That year, he was promoted to the rank of colonel. At 38, he was the youngest colonel in the Serbian General Staff. He was appointed ordnance officer to King Peter in 1916. Towards the end of the war, Nedić was given command of an infantry brigade of the Timok Division.

Nedić remained a brigade commander within the Timok Division until the end of 1918 and served as the 3rd Army chief of staff. Beginning in 1919, he also served as the de facto head of the 4th Army District in Croatia because its nominal commander, General Božidar Janković, was old and infirm. Nedić's cousin, Dimitrije Ljotić, and their mutual friend Stanislav Krakov, also served in the 4th Army District and were commanded by Nedić. When the Royal Yugoslav Army (Serbo-Croatian Latin: Vojska Kraljevine Jugoslavije, VKJ) was formed in 1919 he was absorbed into the army at the same rank. He was promoted to Divizijski đeneral in 1923, and subsequently commanded a division then was Secretary-General of the Committee of National Defence.

In 1930, Nedić was promoted to the rank of Armijski đeneral, (Note: Armiski đeneral was equivalent to a United States lieutenant general.) and assumed command of the 3rd Army in Skoplje. Nedić was appointed Chief of the General Staff in June 1934, and held this position until the following year, when he became the third member of the Military Council, probably because of his strained relations with the Minister for the Army and Navy, Petar Živković. At the time, British diplomatic staff observed that he was "somewhat slow-thinking and obstinate".

On 13 August 1939, Nedić was appointed Minister of the Army and Navy as part of the Cvetković–Maček Agreement. Ljotić later assisted the SS-Reichssicherheitshauptamt (Reich Security Central Office, RSHA) in establishing contacts with him. He also exploited the connections he had with Nedić to ensure that the banned Zbor-published journal Bilten (Bulletin) was distributed to members of the VKJ. The journal was published illegally in a military printing house and distributed throughout Yugoslavia by military couriers.

Because of his disapproval of a potential participation in the war against Adolf Hitler's Germany, Nedić was dismissed on 6 November 1940 by Prince Paul. This was most likely out of unease with Nazi Germany's ally, Fascist Italy which at the time harboured the Croatian extreme nationalist Ustashe leader Ante Pavelić in exile in Rome, and because of the rhetoric of some Italian fascists in the past such as the late Gabriele D'Annunzio, who were violently opposed to a Yugoslav state. Prince Paul sympathised with Britain and Greece, but would not bring Yugoslavia into the war at present while Nedić had pressed for Yugoslavia to accept Hitler's offer of having Yugoslavia sign the Tripartite Pact. The prince regent wanted to keep Yugoslavia neutral as he was painfully well aware of the greater military power of the Reich, but did not want an alignment with Germany, which led to clashes with Nedić.

Germany had also offered Yugoslavia the province of Greek Macedonia as a reward for signing the Tripartite Pact, which would have given Yugoslavia Thessaloniki, Greece's second-largest city, and access to the Aegean Sea. Paul, who was married to a Greek princess, rejected the bribe of Greek Macedonia; Nedić had been in favor of accepting the offer. Nedić believed that Germany would win the war and favored having Yugoslavia join the winning side while also being very keen to annex Greek Macedonia. Nedić's viewpoint was Serbian rather than Yugoslav, and his primary concern was to protect Serbia from losing territory to neighbors such as Hungary, Bulgaria and Italy, which he believed could be best achieved with an alliance with Germany.

Under the strong German pressure with the Foreign Minister Joachim von Ribbentrop threatening war if Yugoslavia did not sign the Tripartite Pact, Prince Paul had Yugoslavia sign the pact on 25 March 1941, but he added the proviso that Yugoslavia would not grant transit rights to Germany to invade Greece. Paul's advantage was that though Yugoslavia was poor, the kingdom was rich in minerals including coal, iron, copper, gold, silver, lead, zinc, chrome, manganese and bauxite. Germany was Yugoslavia's largest trading partner, with 41% of all Yugoslav exports going to the Reich by 1939, and the mines of Yugoslavia were important to sustaining the German economy. Hitler preferred to have Yugoslavia as a German ally rather than risk the destruction of Yugoslavia's mines, over which he sought control. Nedić welcomed the coup d'état of March 1941 which deposed the regime that had signed the Tripartite Pact, and commanded the 3rd Army Group in the German-led Axis invasion that followed. The new prime minister, Dušan Simović, thought very highly of Nedić and gave him the command of the 3rd Army Group, saying he was the best general available. Unlike the other Yugoslav generals captured by the Wehrmacht in April 1941, Nedić was not sent to a POW camp in Germany, but instead released to his home in Belgrade.

== German-occupied territory of Serbia ==
Wehrmacht commander Heinrich Danckelmann decided to entrust Nedić with the administration of German-occupied territory of Serbia, officially named the Territory of the Military Commander in Serbia, in order to suppress Serb resistance. With the commencement of Operation Barbarossa in 1941, the Reich made defeating the Soviet Union its main priority; Nedić's government was created in order to provide indigenous forces to hunt down guerillas. The three Wehrmacht motorised divisions that had conquered Yugoslavia in April were pulled out by June for Operation Barbarossa; the total Wehrmacht forces in Serbia in the summer of 1941 amounted to three second-rate infantry divisions, ineffective against guerrilla bands in the mountainous countryside. Danckelmann demanded additional Wehrmacht and SS/police, only to be told that no additional forces would be sent to Serbia until Operation Barbarossa was concluded. Danckelmann's deputy, Harald Turner, suggested raising Serbian forces to put down the Partisan rebellion, which in turn required a Serbian government.

The German Auswärtiges Amt (Foreign Office) sent out Edmund Veesenmayer to Belgrade with orders to find a prominent Serb leader who was well-respected, could be trusted to deal "ruthlessly" with the guerrillas, and was capable of raising a para-military force. Veesenmayer selected Nedić under the grounds that he had the necessary experience to raise para-military forces, was well-respected by the Serbs, had an authoritarian personality and leadership style, and was fanatically anti-Communist and a great believer in the Nazi "final victory".

Nedić had recently endured the loss of his only son and pregnant daughter-in-law in a munitions explosion in Smederevo, in which several thousands died. He accepted the post of the prime minister in the government called the Government of National Salvation, on 29 August 1941. Mass imprisonment of the Jews started, with police and gendarmerie of under Nedićs quisling government assisting the Germans.

The German historian Marie-Jannine Calic wrote that Nedić's ideology was "...a mixture of ultraconservatism and the chauvinism of the fascist Zbor movement, a strange conglomerate of heterogeneous ideological elements creating an ethnic-racist, blood-and-soil cult and religious Orthodox messianism, coupled with a fixation on an age-old Serb patriarchal family structure and village community". Calic wrote that Nedić was motivated to collaborate by his beliefs that he could protect the Serbs from the worst of the occupation, that Germany would win the war and that he could best secure Serbia's place in the "New Order of Europe", and that Serb society had become "sick" and needed his stern regime to cure it. Nedić did not envision the restoration of Yugoslavia after the war; he instead expected to lead a Serb state. Hitler regarded all Serbs as treacherous and scheming, whom he contemptuously labelled a nation of "bandits", and Nedić was never fully trusted in Berlin. Nedić did not help his cause in Berlin by professing to be still loyal to the House of Karađorđević as he maintained that the teenage King Peter II had been merely misled.

On 28 August 1941, the prime minister of the government-in-exile, General Dušan Simović gave a speech on the BBC's Serbo-Croatian language station in which he claimed that the invasion of Yugoslavia had delayed the invasion of the Soviet Union by five weeks and presented Yugoslava's defeat as a sort of victory for the Allies. Nedić responded by giving a speech on Radio Belgrade in which he mockingly called Simović "the savior of Bolshevism".

On 1 September 1941 Nedić made a speech on Radio Belgrade in which he declared the intent of his administration to "save the core of the Serbian people" by accepting the occupation of Germany in the area of Šumadija, Drina Valley, Pomoravlje and Banat. He also spoke against organizing resistance to the occupying forces. Unlike the government of Marshal Philippe Pétain in Vichy France, which the Germans treated as a sovereign state with full diplomatic relations, Nedić's "Government of National Salvation" was not allowed full sovereignty. The control of the economy, the financial system, the police, and the military always rested in German hands, and Germany did not send an ambassador to Belgrade. Nedić was also denied any authority over the volksdeutsche (ethnic Germans) living in Serbia, who were organized into a state-within-the-state under direct German control.

The two paramilitary forces that Nedić did control was the Serbian State Guard and the Serbian Volunteer Corps, both of which existed only to assist German forces with hunting down Yugoslav Partisans who had adopted guerrilla warfare. Nedić was unpopular with most Serbs. The urban middle class largely remained loyal to King Peter II and his government-in-exile in London; the peasants distrusted Nedić's government, which proved incapable of curtailing the German economic exploitation of Serbia. Nedić imposed a strict censorship, created a National Labour Service, and "cleansed" the education system by firing all teachers and university professors suspected of opposing the occupation.

Nedić had a strong distrust of intellectuals, and he brought in a "Serbian Cultural Plan" for the "renewal" of Serbia that defined "Serb" in racial terms. In common with the other "submerged" (i.e conquered) nations of Eastern Europe, intellectuals in Serbia had an immense prestige as the guardians of the national culture. Nedić's purge of the educational system, his attacks on intellectuals opposed to his regime, and his attempts to promote intellectuals favorable to his regime were part of a wider effort to redefine Serbian identity in racial-ethnoreligious terms. The centerpiece of his efforts was the "Committee for the Protection of Serbian Blood", a group of intellectuals who defined the Serbs as "Aryan" and Orthodox.

Nedić's Ministry of Education, Ljotić and the intellectuals from the Zbor prepared Serbia and its youth by changing the education system in order to prepare the society for Hitler’s New Europe, in which anti-Semitism and anti-Communism were integral parts of the new ideological framework. About the "great" Adolf Hitler hundreds of texts was written by Nedic's propaganda.

Nedić's propaganda machine was funded by Germany and it promoted anti-Semitism and anti-communism, linking these to anti-Masonry. In his speeches Nedić used terms such as "Communist-Jewish rabble" and "Communist-Masonic-Jewish-English mafia". His propaganda employed other terms from Nazi racial theories including "white race", "pure race", "aryanism", and he strongly advocated protection of the Serbian people from "irregular mixtures".

Nedić's government implemented regulations issued by the occupation authorities which deprived the Romani and Jewish population of the ability to work.

In March 1942, Nedić established the Serbian State Guard (Srpska državna straža) with German support. Nedić’s control over the force was short-lived, as the Higher SS and Police Leader in Serbia, August Meyszner, quickly took command of the force. According to Philip J. Cohen, the State Guard guarded the Banjica concentration camp and, citing survivor memoirs, reports that the Guard and the Belgrade Special Police carried out executions of inmates, including children. Raphael Israeli writes that the camp was jointly administered by German authorities and local collaborators, with the Gestapo supervising operations and carrying out most executions, while the camp administration was under the authority of the Special Police. In October 1943, the State Guard was placed under the operational control of the SS. Its members were employed in executing captured Partisans.

The puppet government under Nedić accepted many refugees, the majority of Serbian descent. The Ustaše regime in Croatia had waged a genocidal campaign against the Prečani Serbs of the Krajina and Bosnia and Herzegovina, leading to thousands of refugees fleeing into Serbia proper, and much of Nedić's time was taken up with trying to provide aid for the refugees. However, Nedić's inability to stop the Ustaše violence against the prečani Serbs did much to undermine his image in Serbia, and he admitted that he had asked the Germans to pressure the government in Zagreb.

The civil war unleashed in the German-occupied territory of Serbia was more lethal than the German occupation itself. In total, between 141,000 and 167,000 people died in Serbia of war-related causes. These deaths included 34,000 killed by the Germans and their Serb collaborators, 46,000 deaths in prisons and camps, and 33,000 Chetnik and 42,000 Partisan combatants. At least 300,000 people were deported from Serbia or held in prisons and concentration camps.

German anti-Partisan reprisal policy demanded that 100 Serbs be killed for each German soldier killed, and 50 killed for each wounded German; the Kragujevac massacre was one instance of such a reprisal. By December 1941, following an offensive that saw a half-million German, Italian, Bulgarian, and Hungarian troops—joined by forces that Nedić raised—the Partisans were driven out of Serbia, having fled into the mountains of Bosnia-Herzegovina.

Nedić was quick to implement Hitler's anti-Semitic policies. Belgrade became the first city in Europe to be declared Judenfrei ("clean of Jews"); Serbia was declared so in August 1942. Nedić secretly diverted money and arms from his government to the Chetniks. The military forces of Ljotić and Nedić joined the Wehrmacht in its anti-Communist operations.

In his 1942 Christmas address, Nedić announced that "the old world, which had destroyed our state, is over and replaced by the new one. This new world will elevate Serbia to its rightful and honorable place in the new Europe; under the new leadership (of Germany) we look courageously into the future". In 1942 he outlined a memo of his vision of "Great Serbia" in which Bosnia-Herzegovina, Srijem, and Dalmatia lie within Serbia's borders, their populations replaced by Serbian settlers. On 28 February 1943, the commanding general in Serbia reduced the German reprisal policy to 50 hostages for each German soldier, armed forces employee, civilian or Bulgarian soldier killed, and 25 for each German or Bulgarian wounded.

Nedić was received by Adolf Hitler in September 1943. Nedić requested the annexation of East Bosnia, Montenegro, the Sanjak, Kosovo-Metohija, and Srijem. Joachim von Ribbentrop opposed Nedić’s demands; Hitler appeased Nedić with the promise of concessions elsewhere.

On 4 October 1944, with the successes of the Red Army, Bulgarian Army and Yugoslav Partisans and their combined onslaught on Belgrade, Nedić's puppet government was disbanded, and on 6 October Nedić fled from Belgrade to Kitzbühel, Austria (then annexed to Germany) where he took refuge with the occupying British. On 1 January 1946, the British forces handed him over to the Partisans.

== Imprisonment and death ==
Nedić was incarcerated in Belgrade on charges of treason. On 4 February 1946, it is believed that Nedić either jumped out of the window of the Belgrade prison where he was being detained or that he was pushed out to his death. According to official records, he committed suicide by jumping through the window. According to the Register of Victims Killed after 12 September 1944, Nedić was "liquidated".

A former OZNA officer, Miodrag Mladenović, later claimed that on 4 February 1946, he received an order to retrieve a dead body at Zmaj Jovina street, where the prison was located, and transport it to a cemetery for burial. Mladenović said that when he arrived at the scene, the body was wrapped in a blanket and rigor mortis had set in. He said he transported the body as ordered, and that it was buried in an unusually deep grave. Mladenović said he did not see the face of the corpse, and that he learned of Nedić's reported suicide the next day through state media.

== Legacy and controversy ==
In Socialist Federal Republic of Yugoslavia Yugoslavia, Nedić was depicted as a villain until 1985. That year the historian Veselin Đuretić published his book Saveznici i Jugoslovenska ratna drama (The Allies and the Yugoslav War Drama), an account of relations between the "Big Three" allies-the Soviet Union, the United States and the United Kingdom-with the Partisans and the Chetniks. Besides for reversing the usual picture in Yugoslav historiography that had Partisans as the heroes and the Chetniks as the villains, Đuretić also tried to rehabilitate Nedić as a great Serb patriot, which marked the first time ever that any book in Communist Yugoslavia had presented Nedić in a positive light.

During the Milošević era, the regime, with some Serb historians, sought to persuade prominent Yugoslav Jewish organizations and individuals of a joint Serbo-Jewish martyrdom. Regime historians obscured Nedić and Ljotić's murder and deportations of Jews. (See History of the Jews in Serbia.) The 1993 book The 100 most prominent Serbs published by the Serbian Academy of Sciences and Arts included an entry on Nedić in which its editor, art historian Dejan Medaković, claimed that Nedić was "one of the most tragic figures in Serbian history" whose collaboration saved "a million Serbian lives". Patriarch Pavle of the Serbian Orthodox Church held a memorial service for Nedić in 1994, in which he justified Nedić's collaboration with Nazi Germany on the grounds that it was "the only way to save the Serbian people from the revenge of the occupiers".

Demands for the rehabilitation of Milan Nedić intensified in 2000. The minor Serbian Liberal Party attempted to promote his rehabilitation as an anti-Nazi who did his best in an impossible situation, sparking controversy in Serbia. The publisher of a 2002 secondary school history textbook, Nebojša Jovanović, told the daily Politika that collaboration with the Nazis was a way of preserving the "biological substance of the Serbian people".

Nedić's portrait was included among those of Serbian prime ministers in the building of the Government of Serbia. In 2008, the Minister of Interior and Deputy Prime Minister Ivica Dačić removed the portrait after the announcement of Serbian neo-Nazi activity, including marches. Revisionist interpretations required that Nedić's collaboration with the occupying forces and responsibility for the execution of Jews under his rule be obscured, in order to remember him as the "savior of the Serbian people".

On 11 July 2018, the High Court in Belgrade rejected an application to rehabilitate Nedić. During the rehabilitation trial, historian Bojan Dimitrijevic from the Institute for Contemporary Serbian History claimed, based on archived documents, that Nedić was not directly involved in the persecution and killing of Jews. According to Dimitrijevic, Nedić's administration only registered Jews and gave them false Serbian documents, while the Germans rounded them up and performed all the executions. Others argued that Nedić protected Serbs from German violence by aiding in the persecution of Jews. They point out that his regime confiscated and sold the property of Jews after they were executed by Germans.

According to the United States Holocaust Memorial Museum (USHMM), approximately 15,000 Jews were living in German-occupied Serbia in 1941. Most Jewish men were shot in reprisal executions that year while women and children were later killed in 1942 at the Sajmište concentration camp. The USHMM notes that Nedić’s collaborationist government largely shared the Nazis’ political and ideological vision.

According to Jaša Almuli, historian and former President of the Jewish community in Belgrade, one reason for the high proportion of Jews killed in Serbia was the German policy of reprisal shootings in 1941, under which Jews were used as hostages. Almuli stated that approximately 5,000 adult Jewish men were executed under this policy which had been ordered by Adolf Hitler and enforced by German authorities including Harald Turner.

According to Philip J. Cohen, approximately 15,000 Jews perished in Nedić’s Serbia, representing about 94 percent of the Jewish population. According to Jelena Subotić, 27,000 Jews out of 33,500 in pre-occupied Serbia were killed in the Holocaust in German-occupied Serbia, and another 1,000 from central Europe, mostly from Czechoslovakia and Austria. Subotić concludes that of the approximately 17,000 Jews who lived in German-occupied Serbia, 82% of them were killed early on, including 11,000 Belgrade Jews.

During the COVID-19 pandemics in 2020, school classes were presented on the Radio Television of Serbia. In one 8th-grade history lecture, a teacher spoke positively about Milan Nedić and his role in WWII; such statements were not based on the official history textbooks.

Historian Dubravka Stojanović commented on the lecture, stressing that the public's "games played with fascism and anti-fascism" regarding fundamental moral questions of "good and evil" have led society into a state of confusion. She noted problems of historical revisionism and the political rehabilitation of World War II collaborators in Serbian history textbooks.

== Works by Nedić ==
- Srpska vojska i solunska ofanziva, 1932
- Kralj Aleksandar Prvi Ujedinitelj: kao vojskovođ, 1935
- Srpska vojska na Albanskoj Golgoti, 1937

== Sources ==
- Biber, Dušan (1994). "The Yugoslav Coup d'etat, March 27, 1941". In John Erickson & David Dilks (ed.). Barbarossa The Axis and the Allies. Edinburgh University Press. pp. 34–42. ISBN 9781474468060.
- Byford, Jovan (2011a). "Willing Bystanders: Dimitrije Ljotić, "Shield Collaboration" and the Destruction of Serbia's Jews". In Haynes, Rebecca; Rady, Martyn (eds.). In the Shadow of Hitler: Personalities of the Right in Central and Eastern Europe. London: I.B.Tauris. ISBN 978-1-84511-697-2.
- Byford, Jovan (2011b). "The Collaborationist Administration and the Treatment of the Jews in Nazi-Occupied Serbia." In: Ramet S.P., Listhaug O. (eds) Serbia and the Serbs in World War Two.". Serbia and the Serbs in World War Two. Palgrave Macmillan. pp. 109–127. doi:10.1057/9780230347816_6. ISBN 978-1-349-32611-2.
- Calic, Marie-Janine (2019). A History of Yugoslavia. West Lafayette: Purdue University. ISBN 978-1-55753-838-3.
- Cohen, Philip J. (1996). Serbia's Secret War: Propaganda and the Deceit of History. College Station, Texas: Texas A&M University Press. ISBN 978-0-89096-760-7.
- Cox, John K. (2002). The History of Serbia. Greenwood Publishing Group. ISBN 978-0-313-31290-8.
- "Biografija—Milan Nedić". Glas javnosti (in Serbian). 27 January 2006.
- Hoare, Marko Attila (2006). Genocide and Resistance in Hitler's Bosnia: The Partisans and the Chetniks 1941–1943. New York, New York: Oxford University Press. ISBN 978-0-19-726380-8.
- Israeli, Raphael (2013). The Death Camps of Croatia: Visions and Revisions, 1941–1945. New Brunswick, NJ: Transaction Publishers. ISBN 978-1-41-284975-3.
- Himka, John-Paul; Michlic, Joanna Beata (2019). Bringing the Dark Past to Light: The Reception of the Holocaust in Postcommunist Europe. University of Nebraska Press. ISBN 978-1-49621-020-3.
- Jarman, Robert L., ed. (1997c). Yugoslavia Political Diaries 1918–1965. Vol. 3. Slough, Berkshire: Archives Edition. ISBN 978-1-85207-950-5.
- Lampe, John (2014). Balkans Into Southeastern Europe, 1914-2014 A Century of War and Transition. London: Palgrave Macmillan. ISBN 9781137057778.
- Lazić, Sladjana (2011). "The Re-evaluation of Milan Nedić and Draža Mihailović in Serbia". In Ramet, Sabrina P.; Listhaug, Ola (eds.). Serbia and the Serbs in World War Two. London, England: Palgrave Macmillan. ISBN 978-0230278301.
- Niehorster, Leo (2013a). "Royal Yugoslav Armed Forces Ranks". Leo Niehorster.
- Ramet, Sabrina P. (2006). The Three Yugoslavias: State-Building and Legitimation, 1918–2005. Bloomington, Indiana: Indiana University Press. ISBN 978-0-253-34656-8.
- Ramet, Sabrina P.; Lazić, Sladjana (2011). "The Collaborationist Regime of Milan Nedić". In Ramet, Sabrina P.; Listhaug, Ola (eds.). Serbia and the Serbs in World War Two. London: Palgrave Macmillan. ISBN 978-0230278301.
- Rieber, Alfred (2022). Storms Over the Balkans During the Second World War. Oxford: Oxford University Press. ISBN 9780192858030.
- Subotić, Jelena (2019). Yellow Star, Red Star: Holocaust Remembrance after Communism. Cornell University Press. ISBN 978-1-50174-241-5.
- Tomasevich, Jozo (1975). War and Revolution in Yugoslavia, 1941–1945: The Chetniks. Stanford, California: Stanford University Press. ISBN 978-0-8047-0857-9.
- Tomasevich, Jozo (2001). War and Revolution in Yugoslavia, 1941–1945: Occupation and Collaboration. Stanford, California: Stanford University Press. ISBN 978-0-8047-3615-2.
- Perica, Vjekoslav (2002). Balkan Idols: Religion and Nationalism in Yugoslav States. Oxford University Press. ISBN 978-0-19-517429-8.

Military offices
Preceded by Milan Milovanović	Chief of the General Staff of Royal Yugoslav Army; 1934 – 1935	Succeeded by Ljubomir Marić
Political offices
Preceded by Milutin Nedić	Minister of the Army and Navy of the Kingdom of Yugoslavia; 1939–1940	Succeeded by Petar Pešić
Preceded by New title	President of the Ministerial Council of the Serbian Government of National Salvation; 1941 – 1944	Succeeded by Position abolished
