= Jovan Naumović =

Yugoslav general

General Jovan Naumović
- Јован Наумовић
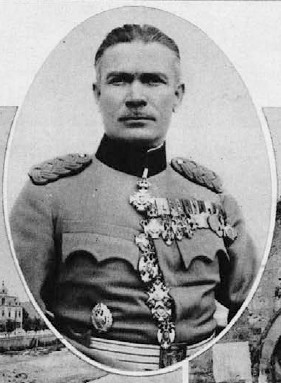
- Jovan Naumović in full dress uniform
- Born: 11 November 1879; Leskovac, Principality of Serbia
- Died: 13 February 1945 (aged 65); Belgrade, Yugoslavia
- Military career
- Allegiance: Kingdom of Yugoslavia
- Branch: Royal Yugoslav Army
- Rank: Armijski đeneral
- Nickname: "Vojvoda Osogovski"
- Commands: (Kingdom of Yugoslavia) 3rd Territorial Army
- Conflicts: Invasion of Yugoslavia (1941)

Jovan Naumović (Serbian Cyrillic: Јован Наумовић; 11 November 1879 – 13 February 1945) was an Armijski đeneral (Note: equivalent to a U.S. Army lieutenant general.) in the Royal Yugoslav Army who commanded the 3rd Territorial Army during the German-led Axis invasion of Yugoslavia of April 1941 during World War II. Naumović's command consisted of three infantry divisions and some smaller formations. The 3rd Territorial Army was part of the 3rd Army Group which was responsible for the border with Albania between Lake Ohrid to Lake Skadar, and the Romanian and Bulgarian borders between the Iron Gates and the Greek border.

== Career ==
After graduating from the Military Academy in Belgrade, joined the Unification or Death organization. He fought as a Chetnik in Old Serbia against the Ottoman Turks (1904–1905) under the nom de guerre Vojvoda Osogovski.

Naumović was chief of staff of the 3rd Army in 1929. After that, he served as a brigade and divisional commander and has head of the gendarmerie. In September 1938 he was appointed to command the 5th Army at Niš.

== See also ==
- List of Chetnik voivodes
