= Danilo Kalafatović =

Yugoslav general (1875–1946)

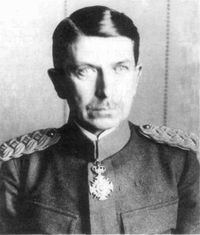
- Danilo Kalafatović, c. 1915
- Born: 27 October 1875; Konarevo, Principality of Serbia
- Died: 1946 (aged 70–71) Moosburg an der Isar, Allied-occupied Germany
- Allegiance: Kingdom of Serbia (1900–1918); Kingdom of Yugoslavia (1918–1941)
- Service years: 1900–1941
- Rank: Army general (Kingdom of Yugoslavia)
- Commands: Chief of the General Staff
- Conflicts: Balkan Wars; World War I World War II: Invasion of Yugoslavia (1941) (POW)

Danilo Kalafatović (Serbian Cyrillic: Данило Калафатовић; 27 October 1875 – 1946) was a Serbian military officer and Army general (Kingdom of Yugoslavia) who served in the armies of the Kingdom of Serbia (Royal Serbian Army) and Kingdom of Yugoslavia (Royal Yugoslav Army) during the first half of the 20th century. During the Second World War, he was briefly Chief of the General Staff and Supreme Commander of Yugoslavia.

== Biography ==
Kalafatović was born on 27 October 1875 in Konarevo. At the end of World War I, Kalafatović became head of the operational section of the Serbian general staff.

During the Axis invasion of Yugoslavia, on 13 April 1941 General Kalafatović was named Chief of the General Staff of the Royal Yugoslav Army by King Peter II, succeeding General Dušan Simović, who was also serving as Prime Minister. Following the defeat of the Kingdom of Yugoslavia, Kalafatović designated Foreign Minister Aleksandar Cincar-Marković and General Radivoje Janković to sign the unconditional surrender of the country to the Axis powers.

He died in 1946 in Moosburg an der Isar, Allied-occupied Germany. His military archive is located in Toronto.

== Sources ==
- Cohen, Philip J. (1996). Serbia's Secret War: Propaganda and the Deceit of History. College Station, Texas: Texas A&M University Press. ISBN 978-0-89096-760-7.
- Levental, Zdenko (1992). Rodolphe Archibald Reiss: criminaliste et moraliste de la Grande guerre [Rodolphe Archibald Reiss: Criminal and Moralist of the Great War] (in French). Paris: L'age D'homme. ISBN 978-2-8251-0197-1.
- Vucinich, Wayne S. (1969). Contemporary Yugoslavia: Twenty Years of Socialist Experiment. Berkeley, California: University of California Press.

Military offices
Preceded by Dušan Simović	Chief of the General Staff of the Royal Yugoslav Army; 1941	Succeeded by Dušan Simović
