= Stane Potočar =

Slovenian general officer

General Stane Potočar
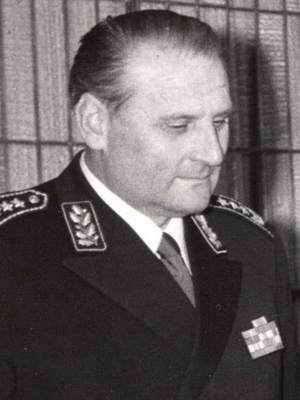
- Potočar in 1972
- Born: 27 April 1919; Mirna Peč (Lower Carniola), Kingdom of Serbs, Croats and Slovenes
- Died: 5 December 1997 (aged 78); Ljubljana, Slovenia
- Military career
- Allegiance: Socialist Federal Republic of Yugoslavia
- Branch: Yugoslav Partisans; Yugoslav People's Army: Yugoslav Ground Forces
- Service years: 1941–1979
- Rank: Colonel General
- Nickname: Lazar
- Commands: Chief of the General Staff of the Yugoslav People's Army (1972–1979)
- Conflicts: World War II in Yugoslavia
- Awards: Order of the People's Hero (4 September 1953)

Stane Potočar (27 April 1919 – 5 December 1997) was a Slovenian general of the Yugoslav People's Army (JNA), who served as the Chief of the General Staff of the JNA from 15 October 1972 to 10 July 1979.

== Early life and World War II ==
Potočar was born in Mirna Peč near Dolenjska to a peasant family. After completing primary school and a butchering apprenticeship in Ljubljana, he worked in his brother's shop and later as a butcher's assistant in Novo Mesto. In 1940, he was called up to the Royal Yugoslav Army, graduating from the Corps Non-Commissioned Officer School within the Guard Cavalry Squadron.

Following the capitulation of Yugoslavia, Potočar returned home and joined the Liberation Front of the Slovene Nation, transferring materials to partisan units. He formally joined the Partisans on March 15, 1942, serving in the Karst Detachment, and was admitted into the Communist Party.

In September 1942, he became the commander of the Third Battalion of the "Matija Gubec" Brigade. He distinguished himself in battles against fascist garrisons and White Guard strongholds, notably at Ajdovec and Žužemberk, earning rapid promotions to major and deputy commander.

By January 1944, Potočar was promoted to lieutenant colonel and appointed commander of the 31st Division. Under his leadership, the division engaged in major sabotage operations against German transport routes, including destroying the Baška Grapa railway and evacuating 180 wounded fighters to Kočevski Rog. In September 1944, he was promoted to colonel and took command of the Ninth Corps, operating in the Slovene Littoral. In April 1945, he was sent to the Soviet Union for advanced military training.

== Post-war career ==
After World War II, Potočar commanded the 23rd Serbian Shock Division and the JNA Detachment in the Free Territory of Trieste (1946–1947). He graduated from the Higher Military Academy of the JNA in 1952 and steadily rose through the ranks. In 1952, he was promoted to Major General, when he commanded the 24th Division in Skopje. In 1960, he was promoted to Lieutenant General, during which he commanded the Maribor Military District. In 1970-71 he commanded the Seventh Army in Bosnia-Herzegovina. In 1971, he was promoted to Colonel General. On October 19, 1972, he was appointed Chief of the General Staff of the Yugoslav People's Army, a position he held until his retirement in July 1979. In 1979, he was also awarded the order of the People's Hero.

== Retirement and death ==
In his later years, Potočar served as a member of the Assembly of the Socialist Republic of Slovenia and held leadership positions in Alliance of Associations of Fighters for the Values of the National Liberation Struggle of Slovenia (SUBNOR) and the Socialist League of the Working People. He died on December 5, 1997, in Ljubljana.

== Awards ==
- Order of the War Banner
- Order of the Yugoslav Flag
- Order of the Partisan Star
- Order of Merit to the People
- Order of Brotherhood and Unity
- Order of the People's Army
- Order of Military Merit
- Order of the People's Army
- Order of Courage
- Order of the People's Hero (September 4, 1953)

== Literature ==
- Ivetić, Velimir (2000). Načelnici generalštaba 1876—2000. Beograd: Novinsko-informativni centar VOJSКA.

Military offices
Preceded by Viktor Bubanj	Chief of the General Staff of the Yugoslav People's Army; 15 October 1972 – 10 July 1979	Succeeded by Branko Mamula
