= Rade Hamović =

Bosnian Serb general officer

General Rade Hamović
- Serbian Cyrillic: Раде Хамовић
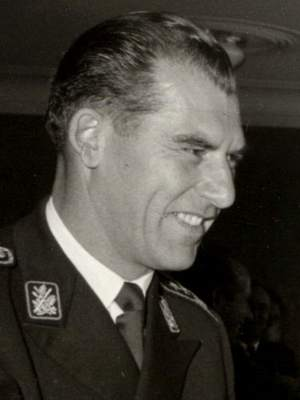
- Hamović in 1954
- Born: 13 February 1916; Stolac, Bosnia and Herzegovina, Austria-Hungary
- Died: 19 May 2009 (aged 93); Ljubljana, Slovenia
- Burial place: Belgrade New Cemetery; 44°48′34″N 20°29′14″E
- Spouse(s): Ljerka Durbešić; Ljerka Kervina-Hamović
- Children: Vuk Hamović
- Military career
- Allegiance: Kingdom of Yugoslavia; Socialist Federal Republic of Yugoslavia
- Branch: Royal Yugoslav Army; Yugoslav Partisans; Yugoslav People's Army: Yugoslav Ground Forces
- Service years: 1936–1941; 1941–1968
- Rank: Colonel General
- Commands: Chief of the General Staff of the Yugoslav People's Army (1961–1967)
- Conflicts: Invasion of Yugoslavia; World War II in Yugoslavia
- Awards: Order of the People's Hero (23 July 1952)

Rade Hamović (Serbian Cyrillic: Раде Хамовић; 13 February 1916 – 19 May 2009) was a Bosnian Serb general of the Yugoslav People's Army (JNA), who served as the Chief of the General Staff of the JNA from 16 June 1961 to 15 June 1967.

Previously, he held the rank of potporuchnik (junior officer) of the Royal Yugoslav Army, after graduating from the Military Academy in Belgrade in 1936, as one of the top 10 cadets in his class. During World War II in Yugoslavia, he was a member of the Supreme Headquarters of the Yugoslav Partisans.

== Literature ==
- Ivetić, Velimir (2000). Načelnici generalštaba 1876—2000. Beograd: Novinsko-informativni centar VOJSКA.

Military offices
Preceded by Ljubo Vučković	Chief of the General Staff of the Yugoslav People's Army; 16 June 1961 – 15 June 1967	Succeeded by Miloš Šumonja
