= Ilija Brašić =

General Ilija Brašić
- Илија Брашић
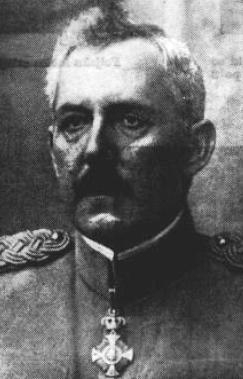
- Born: October 16, 1882; Oparić, Kingdom of Serbia
- Died: March 13, 1951 (aged 68); United States
- Military career
- Allegiance: Yugoslavia
- Branch: Royal Yugoslav Army
- Rank: Army general (Kingdom of Yugoslavia)
- Commands: 3rd Army
- Conflicts: Invasion of Yugoslavia (1941)

Ilija Brašić (October 16, 1882 – March 13, 1951) was an Army general (Kingdom of Yugoslavia) in the Royal Yugoslav Army who commanded the 3rd Army during the German-led Axis invasion of Yugoslavia of April 1941 during World War II.

== Biography ==
Brašić's command consisted of the Bregalnica, Šumadija, Vardar and Zeta Divisions and the Korn Detachment. The 3rd Army was responsible for the border with Albania between Lake Ohrid to Lake Skadar.

He was taken prisoner by the Germans and spent the rest of the Second World War in captivity.
After his liberation, he emigrated to the United States of America.

He died on March 13, 1951, in Milwaukee, Minnesota and was buried in the cemetery of the Monastery of St. Sava in Libertyville, Illinois.
