= Ljubo Vučković =

Montenegrin general officer

General Ljubo Vučković
- Serbo-Croatian: Љубо Вучковић
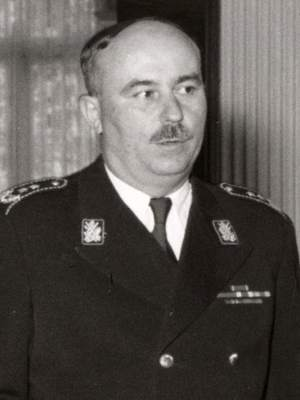
- Vučković in 1955
- Born: 22 January 1915; Ljubotinj (Cetinje), Kingdom of Montenegro
- Died: 7 July 1976 (aged 61); Belgrade, SR Serbia, SFR Yugoslavia
- Burial place: Belgrade New Cemetery; 44°48′34″N 20°29′14″E
- Spouse: Ksenija Vučković
- Military career
- Allegiance: Kingdom of Yugoslavia; Socialist Federal Republic of Yugoslavia
- Branch: Royal Yugoslav Army; Yugoslav Partisans; Yugoslav People's Army: Yugoslav Ground Forces
- Service years: 1935–1941; 1941–1975
- Rank: Colonel General
- Commands: Chief of the General Staff of the Yugoslav People's Army (1955–1961)
- Conflicts: Invasion of Yugoslavia; World War II in Yugoslavia
- Awards: Order of the People's Hero (20 December 1951)

Ljubo Vučković (Serbo-Croatian: Љубо Вучковић; 22 January 1915 – 7 July 1976) was a Montenegrin general of the Yugoslav People's Army (JNA), who served as the Chief of the General Staff of the JNA from 29 April 1955 to 16 June 1961.

Previously, he held the rank of potporuchnik (junior officer) of the Royal Yugoslav Army, after graduating from the Military Academy in Belgrade in 1935, before being promoted to the rank of poruchnik (lieutenant) in 1939.

== Literature ==
- Pejanović, Dušan (1983). Ljubo Vučković — Životni put i revolucionarno djelo. Gornji Milanovac: Dečje novine.
- Ivetić, Velimir (2000). Načelnici generalštaba 1876—2000. Beograd: Novinsko-informativni centar VOJSКA.

Military offices
Preceded by Peko Dapčević	Chief of the General Staff of the Yugoslav People's Army; 29 April 1955 – 16 June 1961	Succeeded by Rade Hamović
