= Mihailo D. Bodi =

Serbian and Yugoslav general (1884–1953)

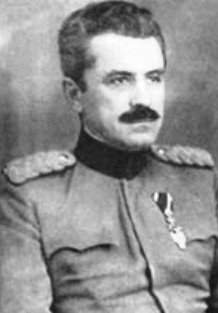
Mihailo D. Bodi

Mihailo D. Bodi (Sofia, Bulgaria, 18 September 1884 – Belgrade, Yugoslavia, 1953) was a Royal Serbian Army divisional general. He also served as Acting Chief of the General Staff in the Royal Yugoslav Army.

In 1901 he enrolled in the Artillery School of the Military Academy as a cadet after graduating from the Belgrade Gymnasium. He graduated with a bachelor of engineering from the Military College and later served as an Engineer Sergeant, a construction and demolitions specialist, building critical infrastructure and carrying out mock demolition raids against potential enemy military targets. As a demolitions specialist, he was an instructor in demolition raids, such as railroads, fuel depots, bridges and other critical components of infrastructure. It was only in 1920 that he transferred from engineering to the General Staff profession.

In September 1915, he married Zorka, daughter of Laza Dimitrijević, a doctor from Smederevo.

== Military service ==
- From 12 August 1905, he was a sergeant in the 1st Engineering Battalion;
- From 7 November 1906, he served as a sergeant in the railway company 2nd Engineering Battalion.
- In the Balkan Wars of 1912 and 1913 as a sergeant he served in the pioneer corps;
- A member of the Serbian-Bulgarian Border Commission.
- During the Arnaut uprising of 1913, he was in the Engineer Battalion.
- In the First World War in charge of railway logistics in Mladenovac;
- Deputy Chief of the Military Railway Inspection;
- In 1916 he was a Member of the Franco-British Railway Commission of the Allied Forces in Thessaloniki;
- On 7 April 1919 he was a Military delegate of the Serbian Army in Budapest
- Military envoy to Hungary until September 20, 1922
- Chief of the General Staff of the cadet Field Division;
- from 17 September 1923 to 30 November 1926 he was Head of the Operational Department of the Operational at the Serbian General Staff;
- At the same time from 13 November 1923 he was a Professor of "Strategy" at the Lower School of the University of Belgrade;
- 30 November 1926 to 4 August 1927: Adjutant to the King Alexander I
- 4 August 1927: Military Attaché to Greece
- 12 December 1927: Military Attaché to Turkey
- 30 April 1929 to 23 October 1931: Interim Chief of Intelligence Department of the General Staff
- 23 October 1931 to 1 April 1934: Interim General Officer Commanding Sava Divisional District
- 1 April 1934 to 14 October 1935: General Officer Commanding Sava Divisional District
- 14 October 1935 to 6 September 1936: Assistant Inspector for State Defence
- 6 September 1936 to 22 October 1937: Interim First Deputy Chief of the General Staff
- 22 October 1937 to 10 October 1938: Deputy Chief of the General Staff
- 10 October 1938 to 12 September 1940: Second Deputy Chief of the General Staff
- 12 September 1940 to 16 October 1940: In reserve
- 16 October 1940: Retired
- April 1941: Assistant Commander in Chief of the Rear Area Command
- 27 March 1941: Recalled to undertake emergency measures.
- 17 April 1941: Member of the Yugoslav representatives who signed an unconditional surrender.
- 18 April 1941: German armistice with Yugoslavia became effective.
- April 1941 to March 1942: Prisoner of war, Germany
- March 1942: Released from POW camp due to poor health and was sent to Switzerland to convalesce.

According to the testimony of Captain Ratko Kalafatović, in 1943–1945 Mihailo D. Bodi was in Switzerland as a military envoy of the Yugoslav government in exile.

== Promotions ==
- Engineer lieutenant, 1905;
- Captain, 1912;
- Major, 1915;
- Colonel, 14 October 1924;
- Brigadier General, 17 July 1929
- Divisional General, 1 April 1934.
