= Seventh Army (Yugoslavia) =

Military formation of the Yugoslav Ground Forces

The Seventh Army was a military formation of the Yugoslav Ground Forces which supervised forces in the Socialist Republic of Bosnia and Herzegovina from 1968 to 1988. It was abolished under the "Jedinstvo" (Unity) reorganisation of 1987-88.

The commanders of the 6th Army were: Radovan Vukanović, Colonel General (1945–1946) and Mihajlo Apostolski, Colonel General (1946–1948).

In 1948 the Sixth Army became the 7th Military District, (later 7th Army District and 7th Army). Mihajlo Apostolski remained in command until 1952. From that point, Veljko Kovačević commanded the Military District as a Colonel General (1952–1956); Milutin Morača, Colonel General (1956–1964); Pero Kosorić, Colonel General (1964–1967); Vlado Bajić, Colonel General (1967–1970); Stane Potočar, Colonel General (1970–1971); Mirko Vranić, Colonel General (1971–1974); Rahmija Kadenić, Colonel General (1974–1977); Milan Aćić, Colonel General (1977–1984); Anton Lukežić, Lieutenant General (from 1984); and General Radovan Kukanjac (from 1991).

The political commissars were: Blažo Đuričić, Major General (1945–1946); Milinko Đurović, Colonel General (1947–1949); Boško Đuričković, Colonel General (1949–1952); and Dušan Korać, Colonel General (1952–1953). The Chiefs of Staff of the Territorial Defence of Bosnia and Herzegovina (TO BiH) were: Franjo Herljević (from 1969), Mirko Vranić (from 1974), Žarko Miličević (from 1982), Mujo Mujkić (from 1984), Miloš Bajčetić (from 1990), and Drago Vukosavljević (from 1991). The Secretaries for National Defense of BiH were Ekrem Durić and Đorđe Maran.

In 1956 the Army Area commanded seven infantry divisions under the Sarajevo, Tuzla, Mostar, and Banja LUka Military Districts.
