= Veljko Kovačević =

Montenegrin general and writer

Veljko Kovačević (19 December 1912 – 24 May 1994) was a Montenegrin general and writer.

== Biography ==
He was born in Grahovo (part of Nikšić) in the Kingdom of Montenegro. After abandoning the studies at the Faculty of Philosophy in Zagreb in 1937, he volunteered in the Spanish Civil War. After internment in France (1939–1941) as requested by the leadership of the Communist Party, he organized partisan units in Gorski Kotar and along the Croatian littoral.

After the end of World War II, he held several senior military and government posts. In 1952, he finished the Higher Military Academy in Belgrade. He commanded the Seventh Army Area in Bosnia and Herzegovina from 1952-56. He studied military history, and war topics were a recurrent theme in his stories and novels.

He died in Belgrade.

== Works ==
- U rovovima Španije (1958)
- Kapelski kresovi (1961)
- Mlada šuma (1966)
- Gavrijada (1971)
- Dani koji ne odlaze (I–II, 1985)
