= 3rd Army Group (Kingdom of Yugoslavia) =

Royal Yugoslav Army formation

- Country: Yugoslavia
- Branch: Royal Yugoslav Army
- Type: Infantry
- Size: Field army
- Engagements: Invasion of Yugoslavia (1941)

Commanders
- Notable commanders: Milan Nedić

The 3rd Army Group was a Royal Yugoslav Army formation which commanded the 3rd Army and 5th Army during the German-led Axis invasion of the Kingdom of Yugoslavia in April 1941 during World War II. It was commanded by General Milan Nedić, and was responsible for the border with Albania between Lake Ohrid to Lake Skadar, and the Romanian and Bulgarian borders between the Iron Gates and the Greek border.
