= Chief of the General Staff (Yugoslavia) =

Head of military staff of Yugoslavia

- Начелник Генералштаба (Serbo-Croatian); Načelnik Generalštaba (Serbo-Croatian)
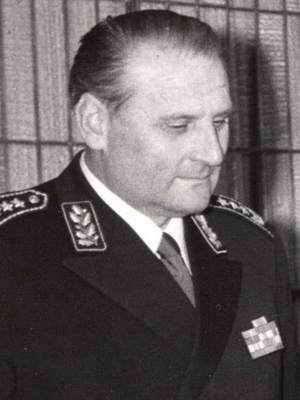
- Longest in office Colonel general Stane Potočar; 15 October 1972 – 10 July 1979
- Royal Yugoslav Army (1918–41); Yugoslav People's Army (1945–92)
- Type: Chief of staff
- Status: Abolished
- Abbreviation: NGŠ
- Member of: General Staff
- Reports to: Minister of Defence of Yugoslavia
- Seat: General Staff Building, Belgrade (1965–92)
- Appointer: Head of state of Yugoslavia (1918–92)
- Term length: No fixed length
- Precursor: Chief of the Serbian General Staff
- Formation: 1 December 1918; 107 years ago
- First holder: Field Marshal Živojin Mišić
- Final holder: Lt. Col. General Ljubiša Jokić
- Abolished: 20 May 1992; 34 years ago
- Superseded by: Chief of the General Staff (Serbia and Montenegro); Chairman of the Chiefs of Joint Staff (BiH); Chief of the General Staff (Croatia); Chief of the General Staff (North Macedonia); Chief of the General Staff (Slovenia)
- Deputy: Deputy Chief of the General Staff

The Chief of the General Staff of Yugoslavia (Serbo-Croatian: Начелник Генералштаба / Načelnik Generalštaba; Slovene: Načelnik Generalštaba; Macedonian: Началник на Генералштабот, romanized: Načalnik na Generalštabot) was the chief of the General Staff of the Royal Yugoslav Army from 1918 to 1941, and the Yugoslav People's Army from 1945 to 1992.

== List of chiefs of the general staff ==
† denotes people who died in office.

=== Royal Yugoslav Army and Navy (1918–1920) ===
No.	Portrait	Chief of Staff of the Supreme Command	Took office	Left office	Time in office	Defence branch
1	Živojin Mišić	Field Marshal; Živojin Mišić (1855–1921) (Note: Previously served as Chief of the Serbian General Staff.)	1 December 1918	5 May 1920	1 year, 156 days	Royal Army

=== Royal Yugoslav Armed Forces (1920–1941) ===
No.	Portrait	Chief of the General Staff	Took office	Left office	Time in office	Defence branch
1	Živojin Mišić	Field Marshal; Živojin Mišić (1855–1921)	5 May 1920	20 January 1921 †	260 days	Royal Army
–	Petar Pešić	General; Petar Pešić (1871–1944); Acting	21 January 1921	10 March 1921	48 days	Royal Army
2	Petar Bojović	Field Marshal; Petar Bojović (1858–1945)	10 March 1921	8 December 1921	273 days	Royal Army
3	Petar Pešić	General; Petar Pešić (1871–1944)	8 December 1921	4 November 1922	331 days	Royal Army
–	Milan Milovanović	General (when appointed); Divisional general (since 1923); Milan Milovanović (1874–1942); Acting	4 November 1922	30 July 1924	1 year, 269 days	Royal Army
(3)	Petar Pešić	Army general Petar Pešić (1871–1944)	30 July 1924	11 April 1929	4 years, 255 days	Royal Army
4	Milan Milovanović	Army general Milan Milovanović (1874–1942)	11 April 1929	18 April 1934	5 years, 7 days	Royal Army
–	Petar Kosić	Divisional general Petar Kosić (1881–1949); Acting	18 April 1934	1 June 1934	44 days	Royal Army
5	Milan Nedić	Army general Milan Nedić (1877–1946) (Note: Later served as the Prime Minister of the Government of National Salvation from 1941 to 1944.)	1 June 1934	9 March 1935	281 days	Royal Army
–	Petar Kosić	Divisional general Petar Kosić (1881–1949); Acting	10 March 1935	12 May 1935	63 days	Royal Army
6	Ljubomir Marić	Army general Ljubomir Marić (1878–1960)	12 May 1935	8 March 1936	301 days	Royal Army
–	Petar Kosić	Divisional general Petar Kosić (1881–1949); Acting	8 March 1936	6 September 1936	182 days	Royal Army
–	Milutin Nedić	Divisional general Milutin Nedić (1882–1945); Acting (Note: Brother of Milan Nedić.)	6 September 1936	6 September 1937	1 year	Royal Army
7	Milutin Nedić	Army general Milutin Nedić (1882–1945)	6 September 1937	25 August 1938	353 days	Royal Army
–	Mihailo D. Bodi	Divisional general Mihailo D. Bodi (1884–1953); Acting	25 August 1938	15 September 1938	21 days	Royal Army
8	Dušan Simović	Army general Dušan Simović (1882–1962)	15 September 1938	3 January 1940	1 year, 110 days	Royal Air Force
9	Petar Kosić	Army general Petar Kosić (1881–1949) (Note: Removed from office in the Yugoslav coup d'état.)	3 January 1940	27 March 1941	1 year, 83 days	Royal Army
(8)	Dušan Simović	Army general Dušan Simović (1882–1962)	27 March 1941	14 April 1941	18 days	Royal Air Force
–	Danilo Kalafatović	Army general Danilo Kalafatović (1875–1946); Acting	15 April 1941	17 April 1941	2 days	Royal Army

=== Yugoslav Army Outside the Homeland (1941–1942) ===
No.	Portrait	Chief of Staff of the Supreme Command	Took office	Left office	Time in office	Defence branch
1	Miodrag Lozić	Lieutenant colonel Miodrag Lozić	1941	1942	0–1 years	JVvO

=== Yugoslav Army in the Homeland (1942–1945) ===
No.	Portrait	Chief of Staff of the Supreme Command	Took office	Left office	Time in office	Defence branch
1	Dragoljub Mihailović	Army general Dragoljub Mihailović (1893–1946)	1942	1944	1–2 years	JVuO
2	Miodrag Damjanović	Brigadier general Miodrag Damjanović (1893–1956)	1944	1945	0–1 years	JVuO

=== National Liberation Army (1941–1945) ===
No.	Portrait	Chief of the Supreme Headquarters	Took office	Left office	Time in office	Party	Defence branch
N/A	Arso Jovanović	Lt. General; Arso Jovanović (1907–1948)	12 December 1941	1 March 1945	3 years, 79 days	SKJ	NOV i POJ

=== Yugoslav People's Army (1945–1992) ===
The Chief of the General Staff (Serbo-Croatian: Načelnik Generalštaba - NGŠ, Начелник Генералштаба - НГШ; Macedonian: Началник на Генералштабот; Slovene: Načelnik Generalštaba) was the chief of staff of the General Staff of the Yugoslav People's Army (JNA) during its existence from 1945 to 1992. He was appointed by the President (after 1980 Presidency) of the Socialist Federal Republic of Yugoslavia, who was the commander-in-chief. While the Federal Secretary of People's Defence (defence minister) headed the Federal Secretariat of People's Defence (Savezni sekretarijat za narodnu odbranu - SSNO) and it was the most effective military person, the Chief of the General Staff (which was the formational part of SSNO) was the most professional and staff body.

No.	Portrait	Chief of the General Staff	Took office	Left office	Time in office	Party	Defence branch
1	Arso Jovanović	Lt. General; Arso Jovanović (1907–1948) (Note: Killed by border guards while allegedly trying to escape to Romania during the Informbiro period.)	1 March 1945	11 September 1945	194 days	SKJ	Ground Forces
2	Koča Popović	Colonel general Koča Popović (1908–1992) (Note: Afterwards served as the Minister of Foreign Affairs from 1953 to 1965.)	11 September 1945	14 January 1953	7 years, 125 days	SKJ	Ground Forces
3	Peko Dapčević	Colonel general Peko Dapčević (1913–1999)	14 January 1953	29 April 1955	2 years, 105 days	SKJ	Ground Forces
4	Ljubo Vučković	Colonel general Ljubo Vučković (1915–1976)	29 April 1955	16 June 1961	6 years, 48 days	SKJ	Ground Forces
5	Rade Hamović	Colonel general Rade Hamović (1916–2009)	16 June 1961	15 June 1967	5 years, 364 days	SKJ	Ground Forces
6	Miloš Šumonja	Colonel general Miloš Šumonja (1918–2006)	15 June 1967	5 January 1970	2 years, 204 days	SKJ	Ground Forces
7	Viktor Bubanj	Colonel general Viktor Bubanj (1918–1972)	5 January 1970	15 October 1972 †	2 years, 284 days	SKJ	Air Force
8	Stane Potočar	Colonel general Stane Potočar (1919–1997)	15 October 1972	10 July 1979	6 years, 268 days	SKJ	Ground Forces
9	Branko Mamula	Admiral; Branko Mamula (1921–2021) (Note: Afterwards served as the Minister of Defence from 1982 to 1988.)	10 July 1979	5 May 1982	2 years, 299 days	SKJ	Navy
10	Petar Gračanin	Colonel general Petar Gračanin (1923–2004) (Note: Later served as the President of the Presidency of SR Serbia from 1987 to 1989.)	5 May 1982	1 September 1985	3 years, 119 days	SKJ	Ground Forces
11	Zorko Čanadi	Colonel general Zorko Čanadi (1925–2003)	1 September 1985	15 September 1987	2 years, 14 days	SKJ	Ground Forces
12	Stevan Mirković	Colonel general Stevan Mirković (1927–2015)	15 September 1987	29 September 1989	2 years, 14 days	SKJ	Ground Forces
13	Blagoje Adžić	Colonel general Blagoje Adžić (1932–2012)	29 September 1989	27 February 1992	2 years, 151 days	SKJ	Ground Forces
14	Života Panić	Colonel general Života Panić (1933–2003) (Note: Chief of the General Staff of the Armed Forces of Yugoslavia from 20 May 1992.)	27 February 1992	20 May 1992	83 days	Independent	Ground Forces

== See also ==
- Chief of the General Staff (Serbia and Montenegro)
- Chiefs of Joint Staff of the Armed Forces of Bosnia and Herzegovina
- Chief of the General Staff of the Armed Forces (Croatia)
- Chief of the General Staff (North Macedonia)
- Chief of the General Staff (Slovenia)

== Sources ==
- Chief of the General Staff: 1876–2000, Ivetić Velimir, Belgrade 2000.
