= Miloš Šumonja =

Croatian Serb general officer

General Miloš Šumonja
- Serbian Cyrillic: Милош Шумоња
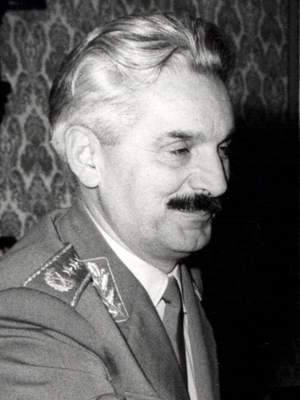
- Šumonja in 1950
- Born: 23 September 1918; Tušilović (Karlovac County), Croatia-Slavonia, Austria-Hungary
- Died: 22 March 2006 (aged 87); Belgrade, Republic of Serbia, Serbia and Montenegro
- Burial place: Belgrade New Cemetery; 44°48′34″N 20°29′14″E
- Spouse: Anka Šumonja
- Military career
- Allegiance: Socialist Federal Republic of Yugoslavia
- Branch: Yugoslav Partisans; Yugoslav People's Army: Yugoslav Ground Forces
- Service years: 1941–1978
- Rank: Colonel General
- Commands: Chief of the General Staff of the Yugoslav People's Army (1967–1970)
- Conflicts: World War II in Yugoslavia
- Awards: Order of the People's Hero (23 June 1953)

Miloš Šumonja (Serbian Cyrillic: Милош Шумоња; 23 September 1918 – 22 March 2006) was a Croatian Serb general of the Yugoslav People's Army (JNA), who served as the Chief of the General Staff of the JNA from 15 June 1967 to 5 January 1970.

== Literature ==
- Ivetić, Velimir (2000). Načelnici generalštaba 1876—2000. Beograd: Novinsko-informativni centar VOJSКA.

Military offices
| Preceded by Rade Hamović | Chief of the General Staff of the Yugoslav People's Army; 15 June 1967 – 5 January 1970 | Succeeded by Viktor Bubanj |
