= Tušilović =

Coordinates: 45°24′N 15°37′E

- Village
- Interactive map of Tušilović
- Country: Croatia
- County: Karlovac County

Area
  - Total: 4.9 km^{2} (1.9 sq mi)

Population (2021)
  - Total: 532
  - Density: 110/km^{2} (280/sq mi)
- Time zone: UTC+1 (CET)
  - Summer (DST): UTC+2 (CEST)

Tušilović is a village in Croatia. It is connected by the D1 highway. It has around 800 people living in it. It is known for its beautiful nature.

== Notable people ==
- Miloš Šumonja
