= Ljubomir Marić (general) =

Serbian military officer (1878–1960)

General Ljubomir Marić
- Serbian Cyrillic: Љубомир Марић
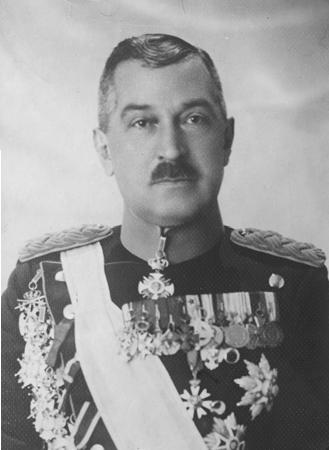
- Born: 18 January 1878; Galovići near Kosjerić, Principality of Serbia
- Died: 11 August 1960 (aged 82); Belgrade, SR Serbia, SFR Yugoslavia
- Burial place: Belgrade New Cemetery
- Military career
- Allegiance: Kingdom of Serbia; Kingdom of Yugoslavia
- Branch: Royal Serbian Army; Royal Yugoslav Army
- Service years: 1897–1939
- Rank: Army general
- Commands: Chief of the General Staff; Minister of the Army and Navy
- Conflicts: Balkan Wars; World War I
- Awards: Order of the Yugoslav Crown; Order of St. Sava; Order of the White Eagle; Order of Karađorđe's Star

Ljubomir Marić (Serbian Cyrillic: Љубомир Марић; 18 January 1878 – 11 August 1960) was a Serbian military officer and a Yugoslav army general, who served as the Chief of the General Staff of the Royal Yugoslav Army from 12 May 1935 to 8 March 1936, and as the Minister of the Army and Navy of the Kingdom of Yugoslavia from 8 March 1936 to 25 August 1938. He was also a professor at the Military Academy.

== Gallery ==
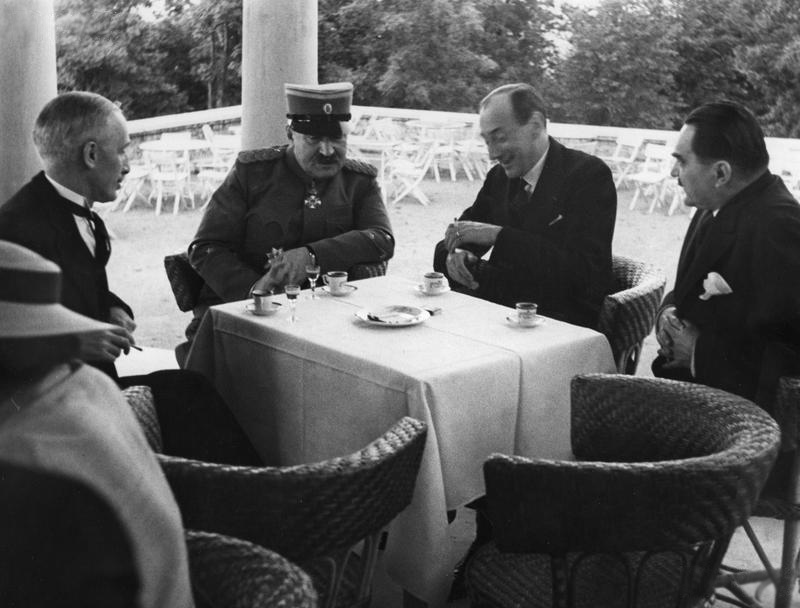
Meeting of the Polish Foreign Minister Józef Beck with members of the Yugoslav Government. From left visible: Yugoslav Trade and Industry Minister Milan Vrbanić, General Marić, Beck and Yugoslav Prime Minister Milan Stojadinović. Belgrade, 28 May 1936.

== Literature ==
- Ivetić, Velimir (2000). Načelnici generalštaba 1876—2000. Beograd: Novinsko-informativni centar VOJSКA.

Military offices
Preceded by Petar Kosić; Acting	Chief of the General Staff of the Royal Yugoslav Army; 12 May 1935 – 8 March 1936	Succeeded by Petar Kosić; Acting
Government offices
Preceded by Petar Živković	Minister of the Army and Navy of the Kingdom of Yugoslavia; 8 March 1936 – 25 August 1938	Succeeded by Milutin Nedić
