= Branko Mamula =

Yugoslav naval officer and politician (1921–2021)

- Бранко Мамула
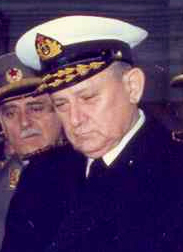

4th Federal Secretary of People's Defence of Yugoslavia
- In office 5 May 1982 – 15 May 1988
- Prime Minister: Veselin Đuranović; Milka Planinc; Branko Mikulić
- Preceded by: Nikola Ljubičić
- Succeeded by: Veljko Kadijević

9th Chief of the General Staff of the Yugoslav People's Army
- In office 10 July 1979 – 5 May 1982
- Minister: Nikola Ljubičić
- Preceded by: Stane Potočar
- Succeeded by: Petar Gračanin

Personal details
- Born: 30 May 1921 Slavsko Polje, Kingdom of Serbs, Croats and Slovenes (modern Croatia)
- Died: 19 October 2021 (aged 100) Tivat, Montenegro
- Party: League of Communists of Yugoslavia (1942–1990); League of Communists – Movement for Yugoslavia (1990–1992)
- Awards: Order of the Hero of Socialist Labour

Military service
- Allegiance: Yugoslavia
- Branch/service: Yugoslav Navy
- Years of service: 1941–1988
- Rank: Admiral of the fleet
- Commands: Yugoslav People's Army (JNA); Yugoslav Navy
- Battles/wars: World War II

Branko "Đuro" Mamula (Serbian Cyrillic: Бранко "Ђурo" Мамула; 30 May 1921 – 19 October 2021) was a Serbian politician and Yugoslav officer who participated in World War II in Yugoslavia. He was later the Minister of Defence of Yugoslavia from 1982 to 1988.

== Biography ==
Mamula was born in Kordun in May 1921 to an ethnic Serb family. He joined League of Communist Youth of Yugoslavia in 1940 and at the start of World War II in Yugoslavia in 1941 he joined the Yugoslav Partisans. In 1942, he joined Communist Party of Yugoslavia. During the war, he was put in charge of numerous units, moving through the ranks of the Partisans.

He was the political commissioner of the fleet, the Military Maritime School Center, the Fifth Maritime Zone, the Political Administration of the Yugoslav Navy Command (JRM) and the Squadron (1945 — 1953), and after the abolition of the function of political commissioner in the JNA, he was appointed assistant commander for political and legal affairs. Upon his return from school in the UK, he became the Head of the Operations Department of the JRM Command. From 1960 to 1963, he was in Sudan as a military adviser to the General Staff. Upon completion of the Operations Course at the JNA War School, he became the Commander of the Military Maritime Area of Pula, and then the Assistant Commander of the Fourth Army District. For three years, from 1967 to 1970, he was the Deputy Head of the Naval Administration in the State Secretariat for National Defence (SSNO), from 1970 to 1976 he was the Head of the Navy Administration, and until 1979, the Commander of the Military-Maritime District and Assistant to the Federal Secretary for National Defence of the SFRY, Nikola Ljubičić. From 10 July 1979 to 5 May 1982, he held the rank of admiral as Chief of the General Staff of the Yugoslav People's Army he served as the Chief of the General Staff of the JNA. From May 5, 1982 to May 15, 1988, he served as the Federal Secretary for People's Defence of the SFRY (Defence Minister), after which he was demobilized. After becoming Defence Minister in 1983, he was promoted to Admiral of the fleet.

He lived in Opatija from 1985 until 1991.

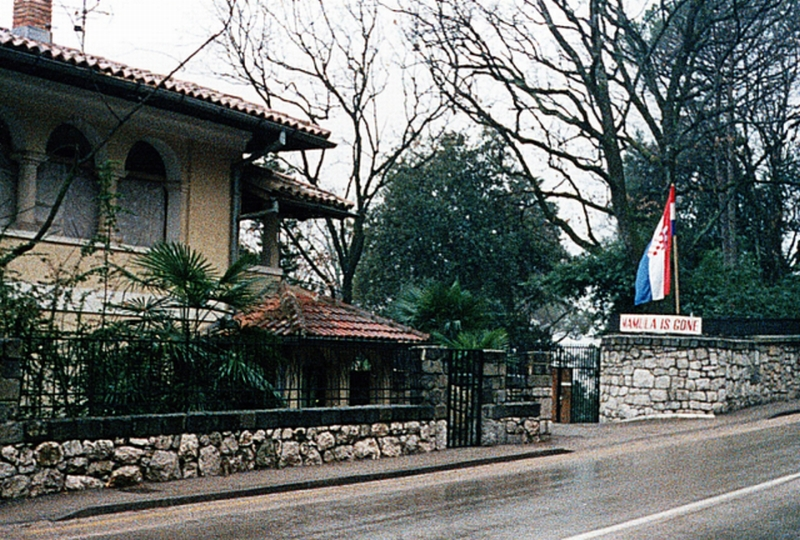
The entrance to Branko Mamula's former villa in Opatija, Croatia, with signpost in English: "Mamula is Gone".

Mamula remarked on the Yugoslav People's Army's (JNA) failure to respond to Milan Kučan's rise in Slovenia, Franjo Tuđman's rise in Croatia, and Slobodan Milošević's rise in Serbia, respectively, in his 2000 book Slučaj Jugoslavija (transl. Case Yugoslavia):

The military leadership of the JNA bears responsibility for not carrying out a coup d'état. Instead, it allowed the nationalist leaders and the separatist behaviour of the two western republics to push the JNA into the hands of Greater Serbian nationalism, which unscrupulously utilised the Army in the inter-ethnic war, and eventually rejected it.

From 2007, he lived in Tivat, Montenegro. Mamula turned 100 in May 2021. He died on 19 October 2021, from COVID-19 during the COVID-19 pandemic in Montenegro.

== Honours ==
=== National Honours ===
- Yugoslavia:
- Order of the Hero of Socialist Labour
- Great Star of the Order of the Yugoslav Star
- Order of the People's Army (3x recipient)
- Order of Labour with Red Banner
- Great Star of the Order of Military Merit (2x recipient)
- Order of Merits for the People with Golden Star
- Order of Brotherhood and Unity with Golden Wreath
- Order of the Partisan Star with Rifles
- Commemorative Medal of the Partisans of 1941

=== Foreign Honours ===
- France: Grand Officer of the Legion of Honour
- Poland: Partisan Cross
- Sudan: 1st Class of the Order of the Republic
- Italy: Grand Officer of the Order of Merit of the Italian Republic
- Kingdom of Nepal: Member 1st Class of the Order of the Gurkha Right Arm
- Indonesia: Navy Meritorious Service Star, 1st Class (Indonesian: Bintang Jalasena Utama)
- Tunisia: Grand Cordon of the Order of the Republic
- Greece: Grand Commander of the Order of Honour
- Austria: Grand Star of the Decoration of Honour for Services to the Republic of Austria
- Jordan: Grand Cordon of the Al-Hussein Order of Military Merit

Military offices
Preceded by Stane Potočar	Chief of the General Staff of the Yugoslav People's Army; 10 July 1979 – 5 May 1982	Succeeded by Petar Gračanin
Political offices
Preceded by Nikola Ljubičić	Federal Secretary of People's Defence of Yugoslavia; 5 May 1982 – 15 May 1988	Succeeded by Veljko Kadijević
