= Radivoje Janković =

Radivoje Janković (7 October 1889 – 1949) was a Yugoslav general of the Royal Army. He had the rank of Division General.

- 17 April 1936 – 22 October 1937: Deputy Chief of Operations, General Staff
- 6 September 1936: Promoted to Brigadni General
- 22 October 1937 – 29 January 1940: Chief of Directorate I, General Staff
- 29 January 1940 – 23 October 1940: Chief of Directorate III, General Staff
- 1 December 1940: Promoted to Divizijski General
- 23 October 1940 – 3 April 1941: Commander, Moravska Division District
- 3 April 1941 – 17 April 1941: Chief of Army Operations
- after 1941: Adjutant general of the King Peter II of Yugoslavia, whom he accompanied into exile.

== Sources ==
- Generali i admirali Kraljevine Jugoslavije 1918–1941, by Mile S. Bjelajac, Andris J. Kursietis, personal archives
