= Viktor Bubanj =

Croatian general officer

General Viktor Bubanj
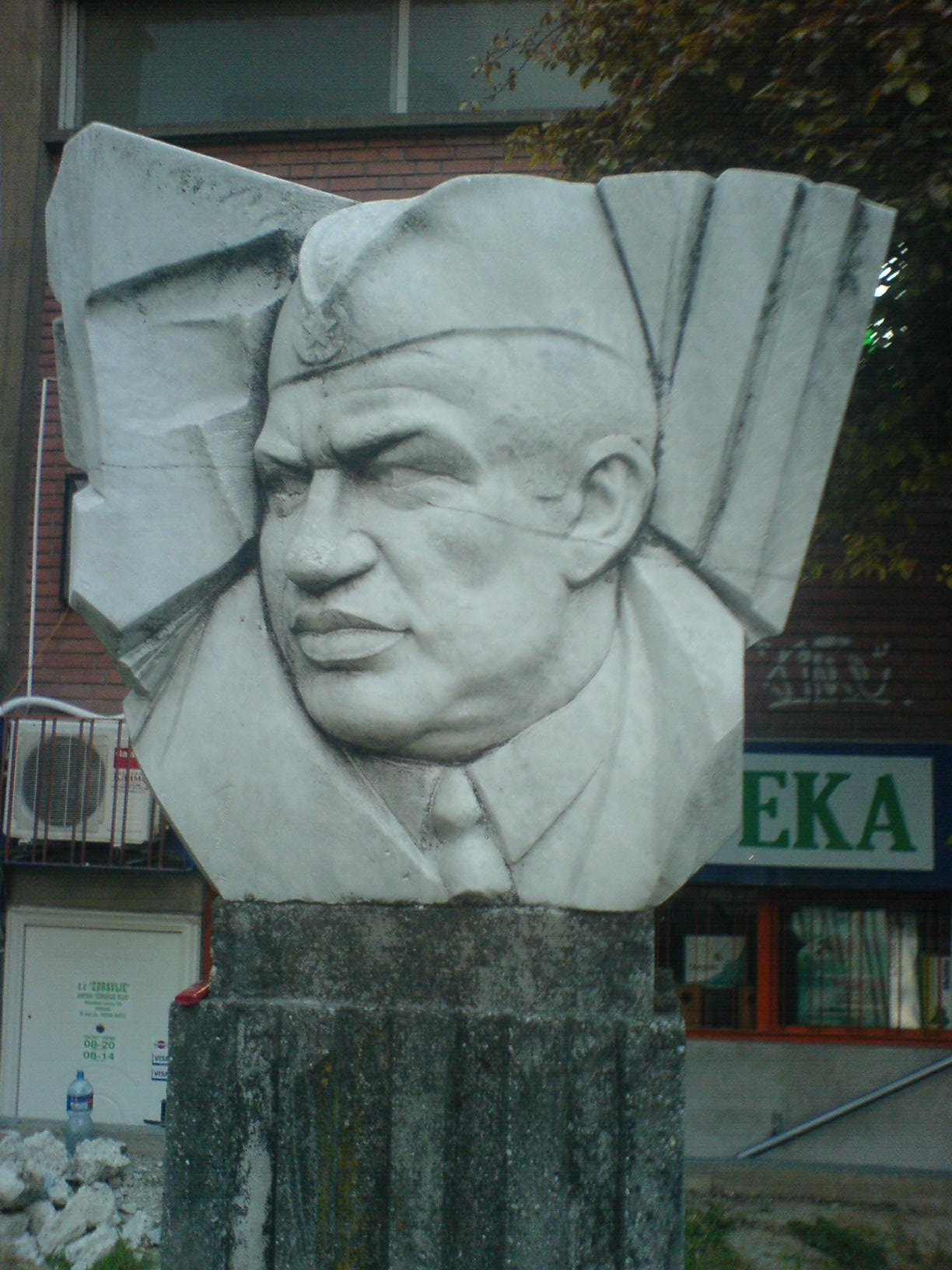
- Bust of Viktor Bubanj in New Belgrade
- Born: 3 December 1918; Fužine (Delnice), Kingdom of Serbs, Croats and Slovenes
- Died: 15 October 1972 (aged 53); Belgrade, SR Serbia, SFR Yugoslavia
- Burial place: Belgrade New Cemetery; 44°48′34″N 20°29′14″E
- Spouse: Mira Car
- Children: 3
- Military career
- Allegiance: Kingdom of Yugoslavia; Socialist Federal Republic of Yugoslavia
- Branch: Royal Yugoslav Air Force; Yugoslav Partisans; Yugoslav People's Army: Yugoslav Air Force
- Service years: 1940–1941; 1941–1972
- Rank: Colonel General
- Commands: Chief of the General Staff of the Yugoslav People's Army (1970–1972)
- Conflicts: Invasion of Yugoslavia; World War II in Yugoslavia
- Awards: Order of the People's Hero (27 November 1953)

Viktor Bubanj (3 December 1918 – 15 October 1972) was a Croatian general of the Yugoslav People's Army (JNA), who served as the Chief of the General Staff of the JNA from 5 January 1970 to his death on 15 October 1972.

== Early life ==
He was born on December 3, 1918 in the village of Fužine, near Delnice. He completed elementary school in Delnice, and the civil engineering department of the Secondary Technical School in Zagreb in 1937. As a civil engineer, he worked on the construction of roads and the Vinodol hydroelectric power plant. He has been a member of the League of Socialist Youth of Yugoslavia since 1936, and of the Communist Party of Yugoslavia since 1939. At the end of 1940, he graduated from the Reserve Officers' School (Pilots) in Pančevo, and as part of a reconnaissance squadron he fought during the Invasion of Yugoslavia.

== World War II ==
At the party meeting in Crikvenica in August 1941, he was elected secretary of the party cell, and in mid-September, a member of the District Committee of the Communist Party of Croatia. Bubanj went to join the partisans, to the Lika Company as leader of a sabotage group. He led persistent battles with the Royal Italian Army's 154th Infantry Division "Murge", the Ustaše and the Chetniks.

In March 1944, by order of the Supreme Headquarters of the National Liberation Army of Yugoslavia, he transferred the duties of brigade commander to Milan Rustanbeg, and with a group of young pilots, he went to the Soviet Union for training by the Soviet Air Forces. During practical training in Krasnodar in the RSFSR, from December 16, 1944 to May 30, 1945, he trained on military fighter aircraft. He had a total of 28 hours of flight time. On May 1, 1945, he was appointed political commissar of the newly formed 254th Air Fighter Regiment, which flew to liberated Yugoslavia in September 1945 and became part of the Yugoslav Air Force.

== Post-war period ==
As a fighter pilot, Bubanj was soon appointed commander of an air division in Zagreb. In the fall of 1946 , he was appointed Chief of Staff of the Yugoslav Air Force, and in May 1954, after graduating from the Higher Military Academy of the JNA, he was transferred to the position of commander of the 3rd Aviation Corps in Zagreb, and then in September 1962, he took over the position of deputy commander of the Air Force and Air Defense and assistant to Federal Secretary of People's Defence Ivan Gošnjak. From May 19, 1965 to January 1970, he served as commander of the Air Force and Air Defense.

Bubanj was a member of the League of Communists Organisation in the Yugoslav People's Army for the Air Force. As a prominent senior military leader, Bubanj was appointed Chief of the General Staff of the JNA on January 5, 1970. He died in office on 15 October 1972 in Belgrade from a heart attack. He was buried with military honors in the Alley of Distinguished Citizens at the New Cemetery in Belgrade.

== Personal life ==
He married his wife Mira Car at the end of 1945 and had three children: daughter Dunja, born in 1946 in Zagreb, daughter Dubravka, born in 1948 in Belgrade, and son Goran, born in 1956 in Zagreb.

== Awards ==
- Order of the People's Hero (27 November 1953)
- Commemorative Medal of the Partisans of 1941
- Order of the War Banner
- Order of Merit to the People
- Order of Brotherhood and Unity
- Order of the People's Army
- Order of Military Merit
- Order of the Partisan Star
- Order of Bravery
- Order of the Legion of Honor
- Order of the Cross of Grunwald
- Order of the Star of Ethiopia

== Literature ==
- Ivetić, Velimir (2000). Načelnici generalštaba 1876—2000. Beograd: Novinsko-informativni centar VOJSКA.

Military offices
Preceded by Miloš Šumonja	Chief of the General Staff of the Yugoslav People's Army; 5 January 1970 – 15 October 1972	Succeeded by Stane Potočar
