= 3rd Territorial Army (Kingdom of Yugoslavia) =

The 3rd Territorial Army was a Royal Yugoslav Army formation which commanded three infantry divisions during the German-led Axis invasion of the Kingdom of Yugoslavia in April 1941 during World War II. It was commanded by Armiski General (Lieutenant General) Jovan Naumović.

== Order of battle ==
On 6 April 1941, the 3rd Territorial Army comprised:

- 5th Infantry Division Šumadijska
- 20th Infantry Division Bregalnička (reinforced)
- 46th Infantry Division Moravska
- Infantry Detachment Strumiki (brigade strength)
- 21st Infantry Regiment
- 114th Heavy Artillery Regiment (motorised)
