= 3rd Army (Kingdom of Yugoslavia) =

- Active: 1941
- Disbanded: 1941
- Country: Yugoslavia
- Branch: Royal Yugoslav Army
- Type: Infantry
- Size: Corps (Note: The Royal Yugoslav Army did not field corps, but their armies consisted of several divisions, and were therefore corps-sized.)
- Part of: 3rd Army Group
- Engagements: Invasion of Yugoslavia (1941)

Commanders
- Notable commanders: Ilija Brašić

The 3rd Army was a Royal Yugoslav Army formation commanded by Armijski đeneral Ilija Brašić during the German-led Axis invasion of the Kingdom of Yugoslavia in April 1941 during World War II. It consisted of two reinforced infantry divisions, two infantry divisions, and a brigade-strength horsed cavalry detachment. It formed part of the 3rd Army Group, and was responsible for the Yugoslav-Albania border between Lake Ohrid and Lake Skadar.

== Composition ==
The 3rd Army was commanded by Armijski đeneral (Note: Armijski đeneral was equivalent to a United States lieutenant general.) Ilija Brašić, and his chief of staff was Brigadni đeneral (Note: Brigadni đeneral was equivalent to a United States brigadier general.) Milan Zelenika. It was organised and mobilised on a geographic basis from the 3rd Army District, which was divided into divisional districts, each of which was subdivided into regimental regions. The 3rd Army consisted of:

- 13th Infantry Division Hercegovačka
- 15th Infantry Division Zetska
- 25th Infantry Division Vardarska
- 31st Infantry Division Kosovska
- Cavalry Detachment Komski (brigade-strength horse cavalry)

Its support units included the 66th Army Artillery Regiment, the 3rd Anti-Aircraft Battalion, the 3rd Army Anti-Aircraft Company, and eight border guard battalions. The 5th Air Reconnaissance Group comprising fourteen Breguet 19s was attached from the Royal Yugoslav Air Force and was based at Tetovo west of Skopje.

== Deployment ==
The 3rd Army was part of the 3rd Army Group, which was responsible for the Yugoslav-Albanian border between Lake Ohrid and Lake Skadar, and the Bulgarian and Greek border between Trgovište and the Albanian border. The 3rd Army was responsible for the Albanian border and western section of the Greek border, and the 3rd Territorial Army was responsible for the eastern sector of the Greek border and the sector along the Bulgarian border. The 22nd Infantry Division Ibarska was to be held as the 3rd Army Group reserve around Skopje. On the left of the 3rd Army was the 3rd Territorial Army, with the boundary running through Prilep to Tetovo. On the right was the Adriatic coast defended by the Coastal Defence Command, with the boundary running north from the Bay of Kotor. The Yugoslav defense plan saw the 3rd Army deployed in a horseshoe around northern Albania. Of the formations of the 3rd Army, the mobilisation of the 31st Infantry Division Kosovska and the Cavalry Detachment Komski was largely complete, the 13th Infantry Division Hercegovačka was partly mobilised, and the 15th Infantry Division Zetska and 25th Infantry Division Vardarska had only commenced mobilisation. All 3rd Army formations except the 13th Infantry Division Hercegovačka were to be deployed in a cordon. The planned deployment of the 3rd Army from west to east was:

- 15th Infantry Division Zetska around Lake Skadar and centred on Podgorica
- 13th Infantry Division Hercegovačka in depth behind 15th Infantry Division Zetska and centred on Nikšić
- Cavalry Detachment Komski centred on Andrijevica
- 31st Infantry Division Kosovska centred on Prizren
- 25th Infantry Division Vardarska from Ohrid north to Debar
