= Petar Kosić =

Serbian officer and Yugoslav Army General (1881–1949)

- Петар Косић
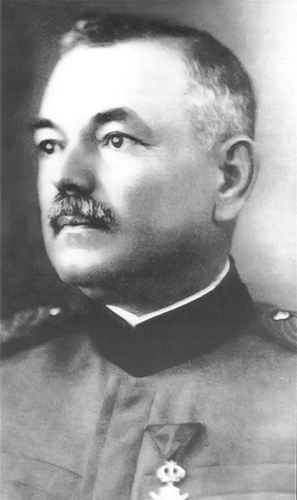
- Petar Kosić in 1940
- Born: 13 May 1881; Bujačić near Valjevo, Principality of Serbia
- Died: 18 May 1949 (aged 68); Belgrade, PR Serbia, FPR Yugoslavia
- Military career
- Allegiance: Principality of Serbia, Kingdom of Serbia, SFR Yugoslavia
- Service years: 1906–1918, 1919–1949
- Rank: Army General
- Commands: Chief of the General Staff
- Conflicts: Balkan Wars; First World War
- Awards: Order of Karađorđe's Star Order of the White Eagle (Serbia) with swords III and IV degree Order of the White Eagle (Serbia) V degree Order of St. Sava I, II and III degree Order of the Yugoslav Crown II and III degree

Petar Kosić (13 May 1881 – 18 May 1949) was a high-ranking officer of the Royal Serbian Army and an army general of the Royal Yugoslav Army who was against going to war with Nazi Germany. During his service as Minister of War and Chief of the General Staff, and on 27 March 1941, he was replaced and retired after the Yugoslav coup d'état led by his classmate, Army General Dušan Simović, who took over as chief of staff and became prime minister of the country.

== Biography ==
He was born on 13 May 1881 in the village of Bujačić near Valjevo, Principality of Serbia, to father Vićentije, a farmer, and mother Milenija. After graduating from high school in Valjevo, he joined the army in 1898, as a cadet of the 31st class of the Artillery School of the Military Academy. Upon graduation, he was promoted to the rank of artillery lieutenant. He continued his education as a cadet of the 14th grade of the higher school of the Military Academy, which he finished in 1906. He served his internship in France and Germany until 1908.

In 1920, he married Olga, the daughter of Professor Stevan Lovčević, the director of the grammar school, the head of the Ministry of Education and the king's teacher. His godparents at the wedding were General Milan Pešić and Pavle Matić, a merchant. Olga and Petar had no children.

== Active service ==
After completing his schooling, he was first appointed a sergeant in the 8th Infantry Regiment on October 10, 1906, and in less than a month, on November 7, 1906, he was transferred to the position of sergeant in the Infantry NCO School. From March 30, 1907, he was the commander of the 4th company of the 3rd battalion of the 2nd infantry regiment, and from November 16, 1908, he was the commander of the 3rd company of the 2nd battalion of the 16th infantry regiment. He held this position until the beginning of the Balkan Wars. In the Balkan wars, he was the commander of the railway stations in Priboj, Pirot and Vranje, then the adjutant of the commander of the Second Army and the adjutant in the headquarters of the Macedonian-Kosovo troops. In the First World War (1914–1918), he was appointed assistant chief of staff of the Bitola Division of the 1st Call. After that, he was appointed as a clerk in the headquarters of the Second Army, and on 8 September 1914, after the failure at Bitka kod Čevrntije (Battle near Čevrntije), he was appointed chief of staff of the Timok Division of the 1st Call. In that capacity, he welcomed the end of the war.

After the end of the First World War, in the period from 26 October 1919 to November 29, 1921, he was a professor of tactics at the Artillery School of the Military Academy in the newly-formed Serbian army. In parallel with the professorship, he was the head of the Operational Department of the General Staff from 4 May 1920, and from 24 November 1921, the assistant chief of the General Staff of the First Army District. He performed the function of acting chief of the General Staff of the Second Army District for a short time and was confirmed as chief of staff on 11 April 1923. On 10 November 1925, he was transferred as the acting commander of the Drava Infantry Brigade, and then, on 10 February 1927, he was appointed Chief of the General Staff of the Third Army District. From 11 April 1929, he was appointed acting commander of the 2nd Cavalry Division. On 16 November 1930, he was appointed First Assistant Chief of General Staff. He was appointed member of the Yugoslav delegation at the Conference for the Reduction and Limitation of Armaments in the period 1932/1933. He was the acting commander of the first army district from 6 September 1936, and the following year, from 18 November 1937, he was the commander of the city of Belgrade. He was appointed Chief of the General Staff and King's governor on 3 January 1940.

In a military coup on 27 March 1941, the March Putsch, he was removed from the post of Chief of the General Staff and retired early. During the Second World War, he agitated abroad against the People's Liberation Movement. On his return to Belgrade, he was arrested on 15 February 1949, in a group with Aleksandar Cincar-Marković, Ivo Perović, Milan Antić and others. In prison, he went on a hunger strike in protest. He died on 18 May 1949, as a result of the hunger strike.

== Officer advancement and decorations ==
He was promoted to the rank of artillery lieutenant in 1900; captain of the first class, 1911; major, 1913; lieutenant colonel, 1913; colonel, 14 October 1920; brigadier general, 1 December 1925; divisional general, 6 September 1930; and army general on 6 September 1937.

He was awarded the Order of Karađorđe's Star with swords II and IV degree, the Order of Karađorđe's Star IV degree, the Order of the White Eagle with swords III and IV degree, the Order of the White Eagle V degree, the Order of Saint Sava I, II and III degree, the Order of the Yugoslav Crown II and III degree and numerous monuments, medals and foreign decorations.

== Works cited ==
- Бјелајац, Миле С. (2004). Генерали и адмирали Краљевине Југославије 1918—1941. Београд: Институт за новију историју Србије. ISBN 978-86-7005-039-6.
- Иветић, Велимир (2000). Начелници генералштаба 1876—2000. Београд: НИЦ Војска.
- Милетић, Антун (2009). Српски Ђенерали у жицама: 1941—1945. Београд: Албатрос плус (Нови Београд: Алфа тим принт). ISBN 978-86-6081-081-4.
