= Bujačić =

- Village (Selo)
- Location within Serbia
- Coordinates: 44°15′27″N 19°54′47″E
- Country: Serbia
- District: Kolubara District
- Municipality: Valjevo

Population (2002)
  - Total: 357
- Time zone: UTC+1 (CET)
  - Summer (DST): UTC+2 (CEST)

Bujačić is a village in the municipality of Valjevo, Serbia. According to the 2002 census, the village has a population of 357 people.

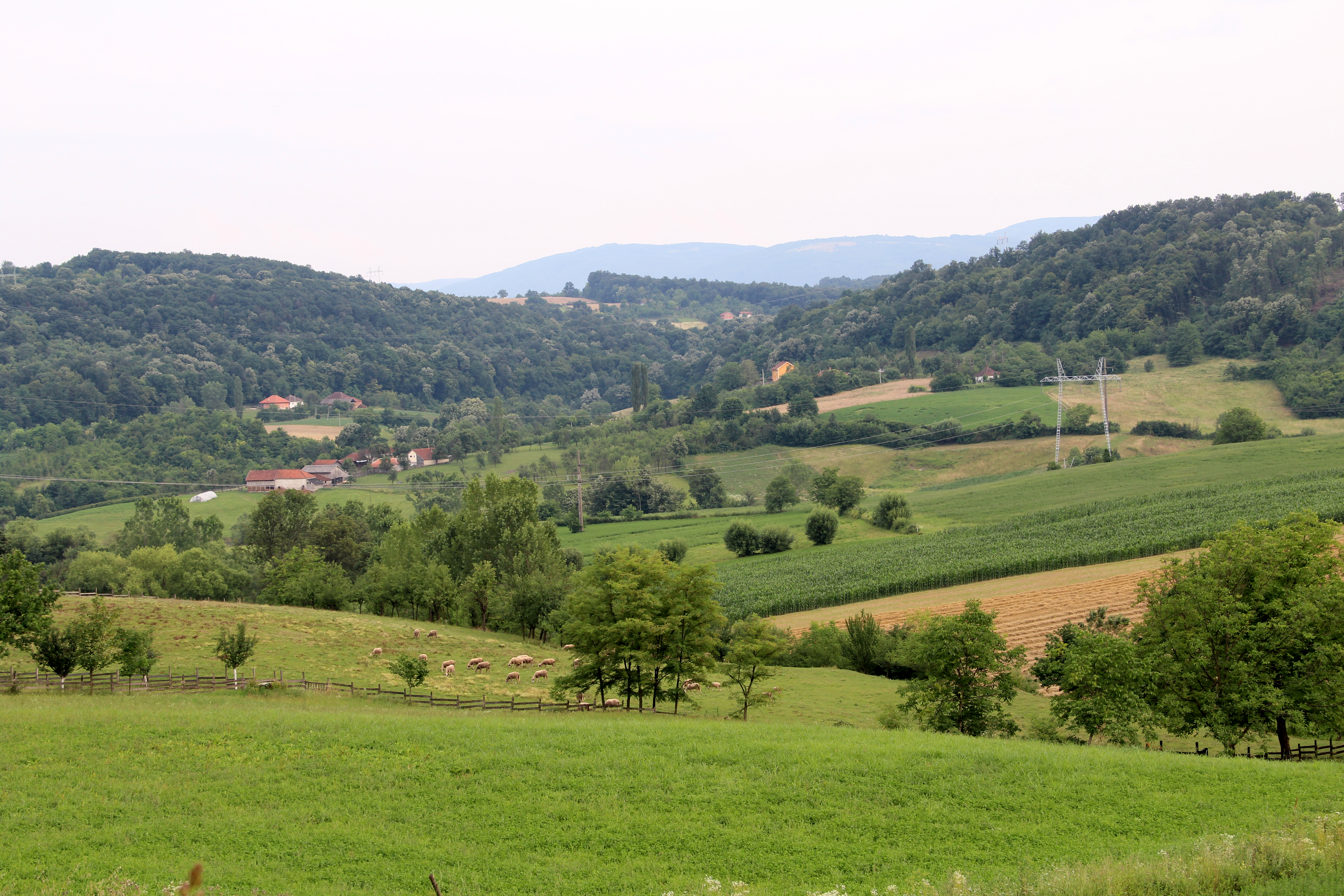
Bujačić - panorama

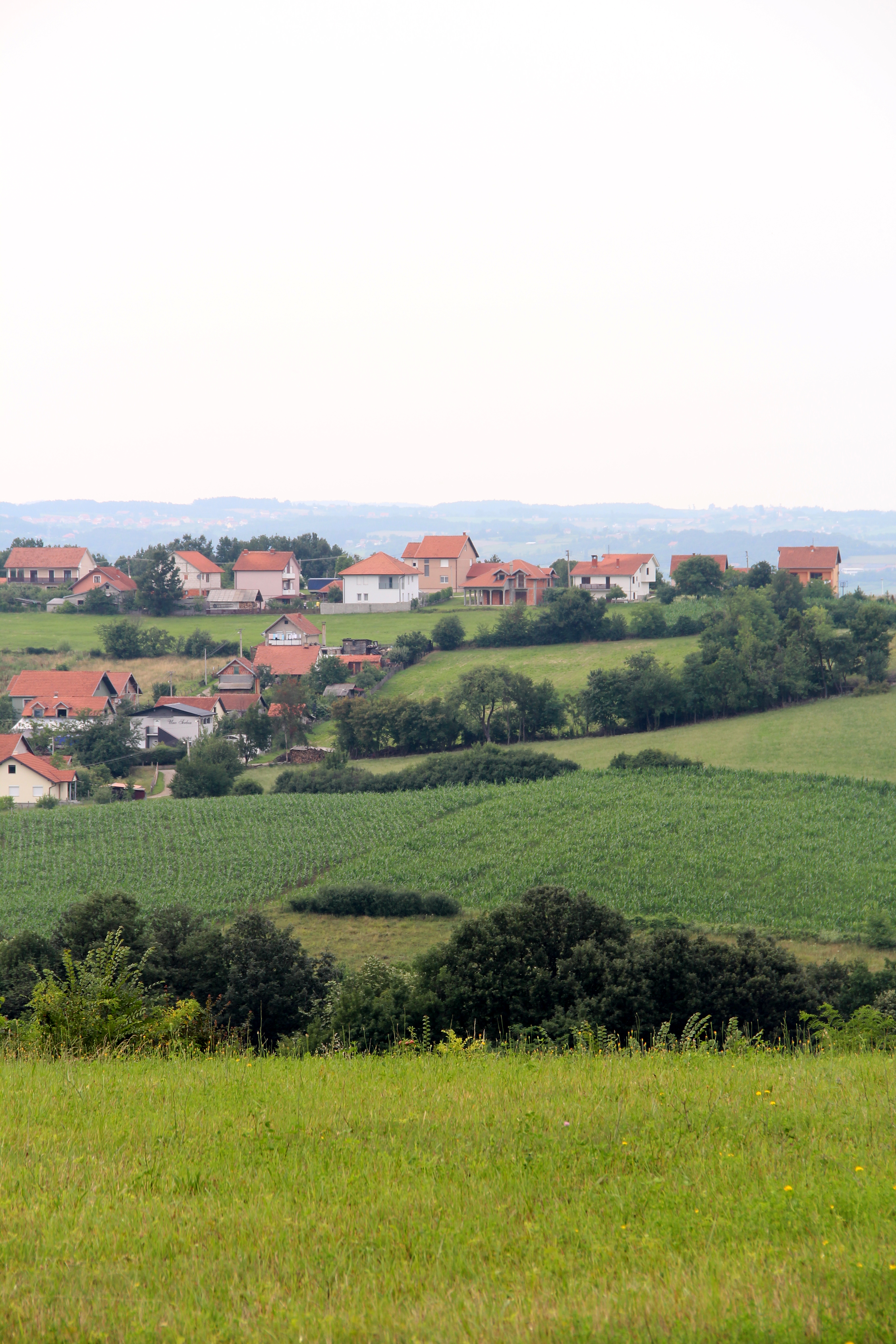
Bujačić - panorama

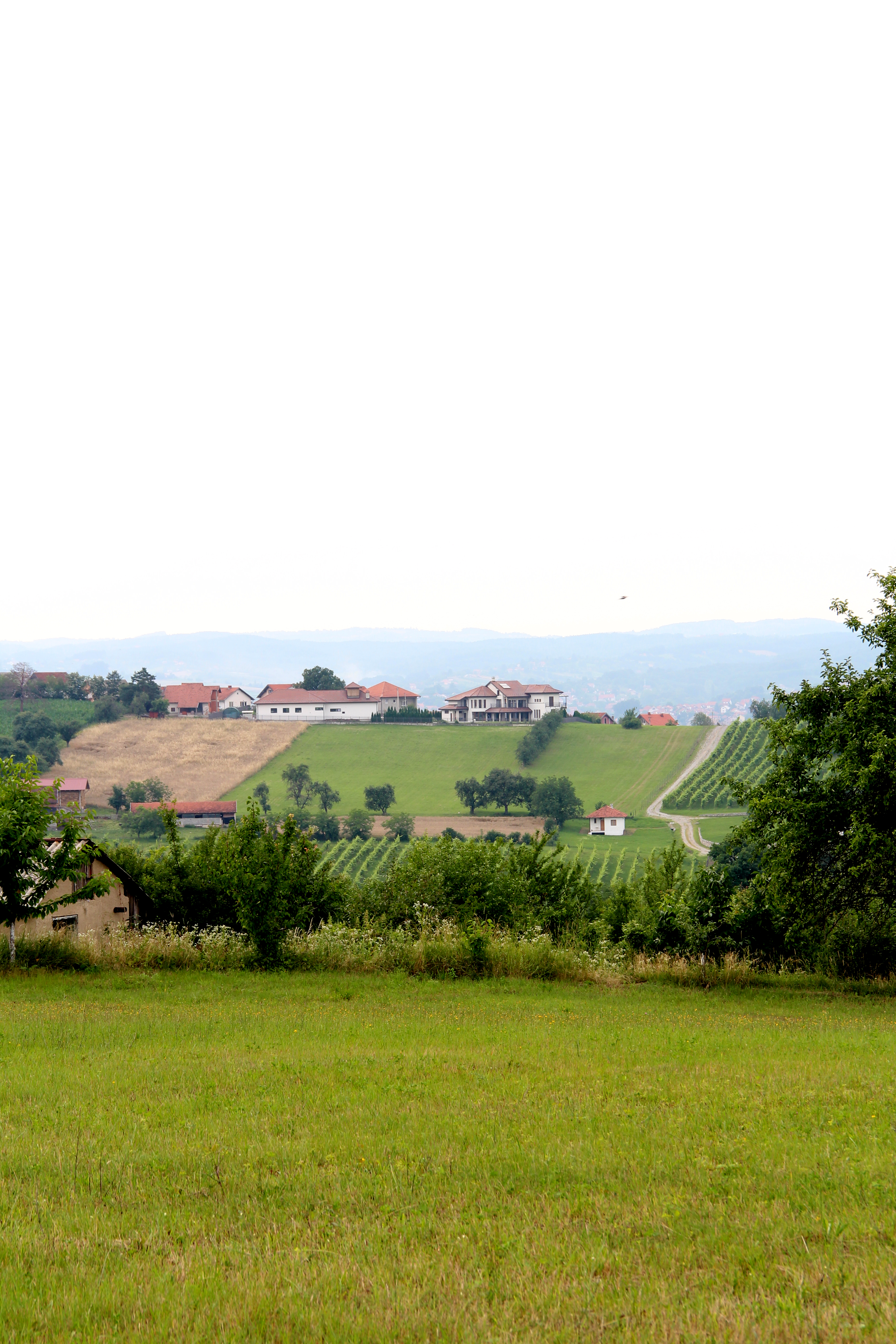
Bujačić - panorama

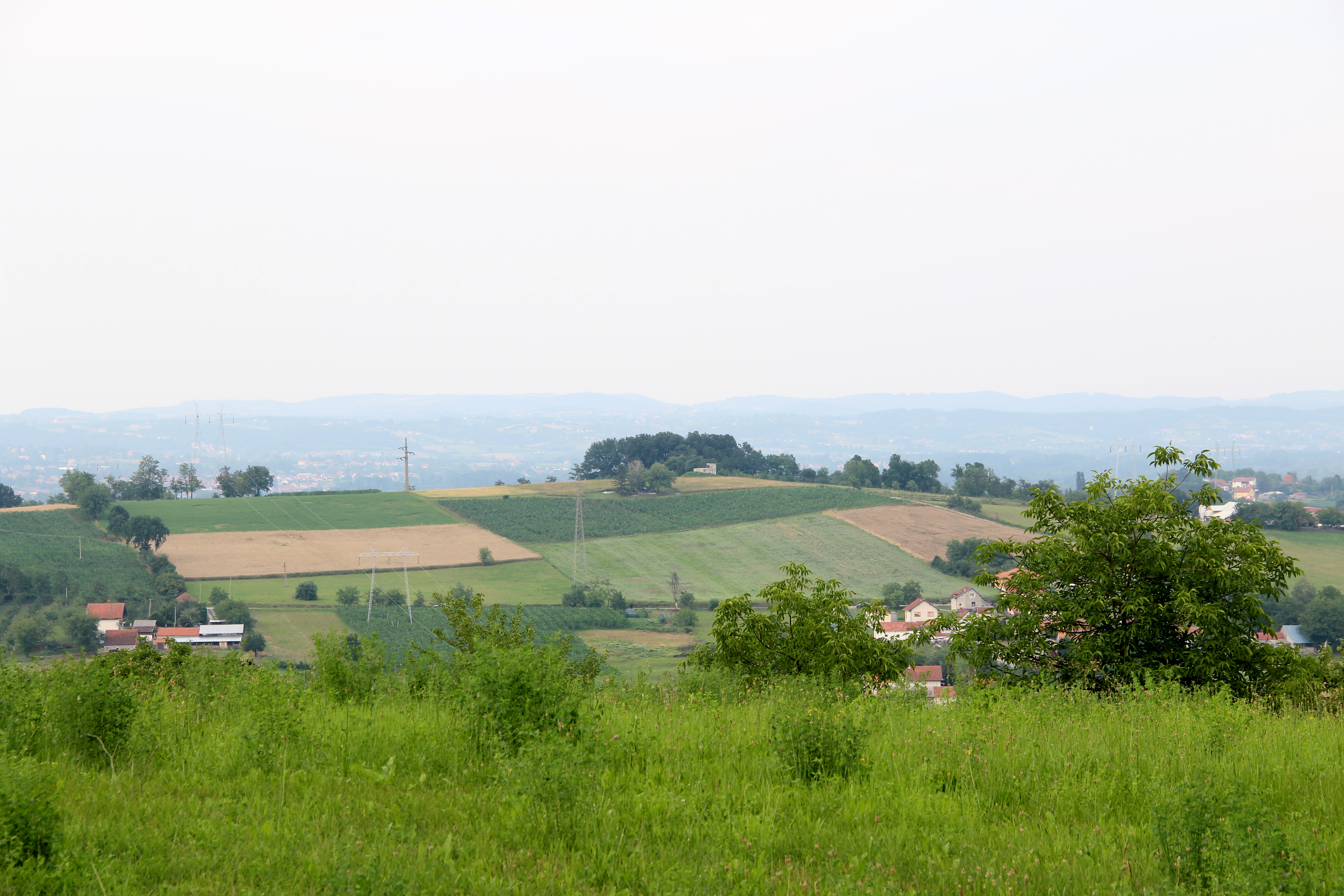
Bujačić - panorama

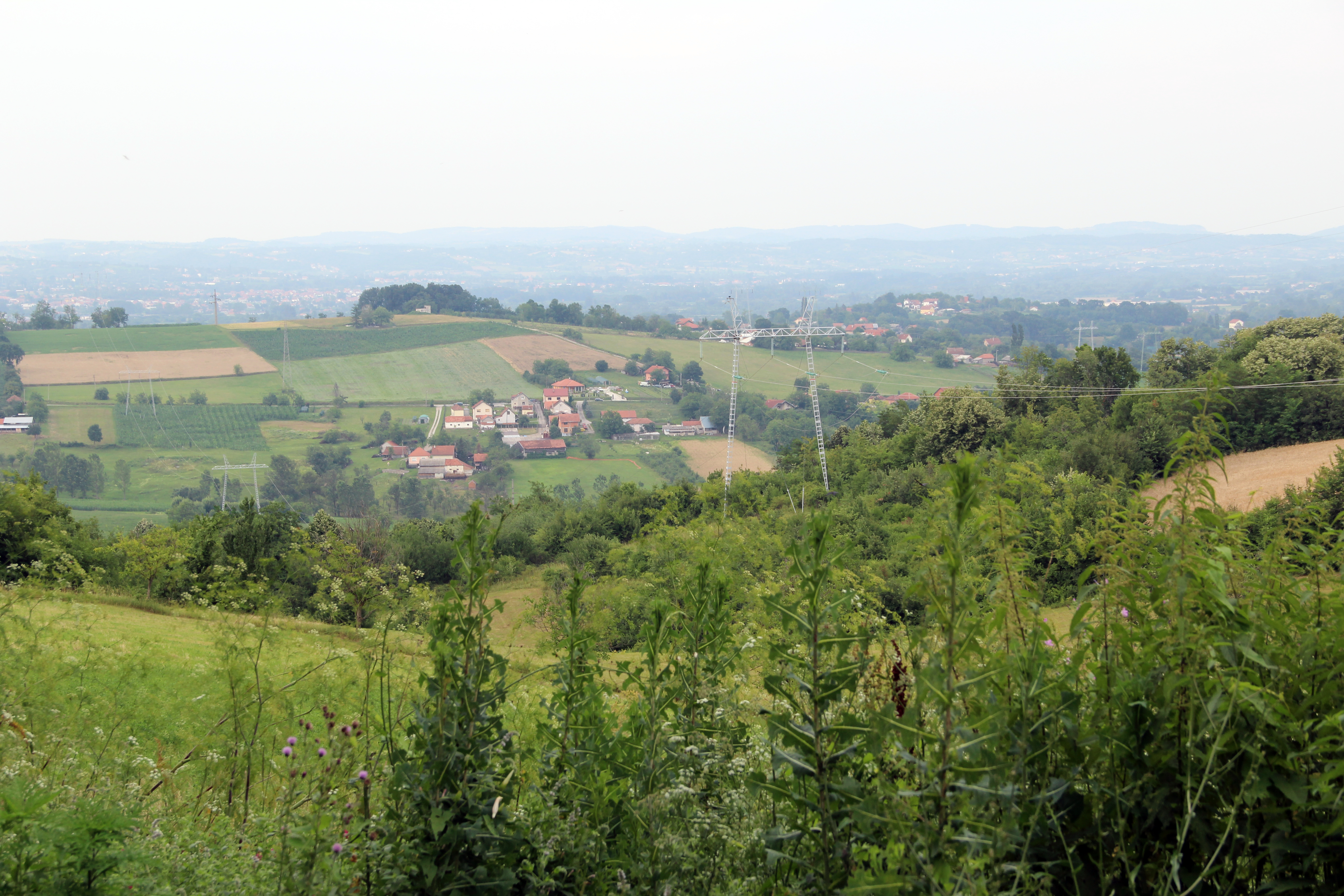
Bujačić - panorama

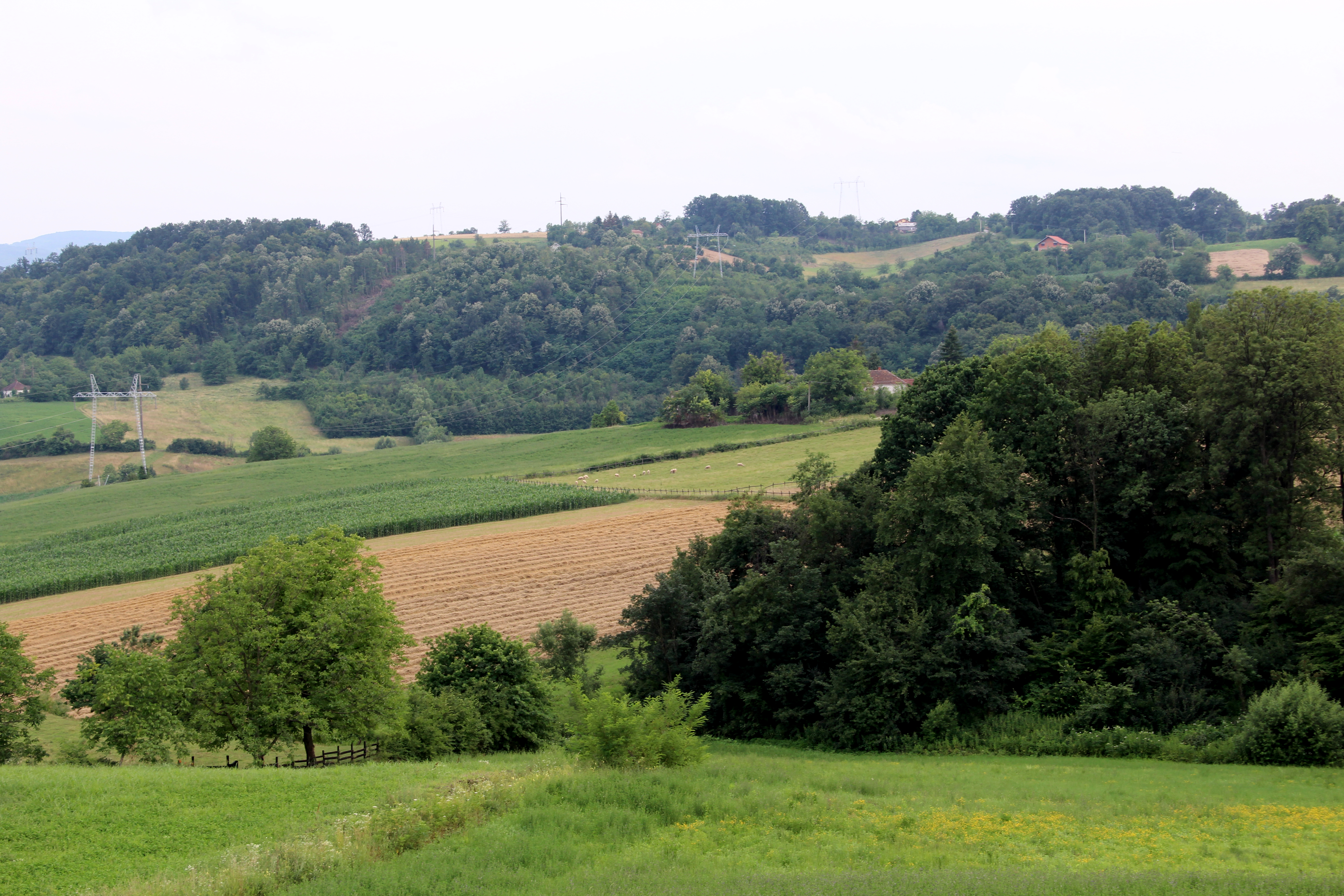
Bujačić - panorama

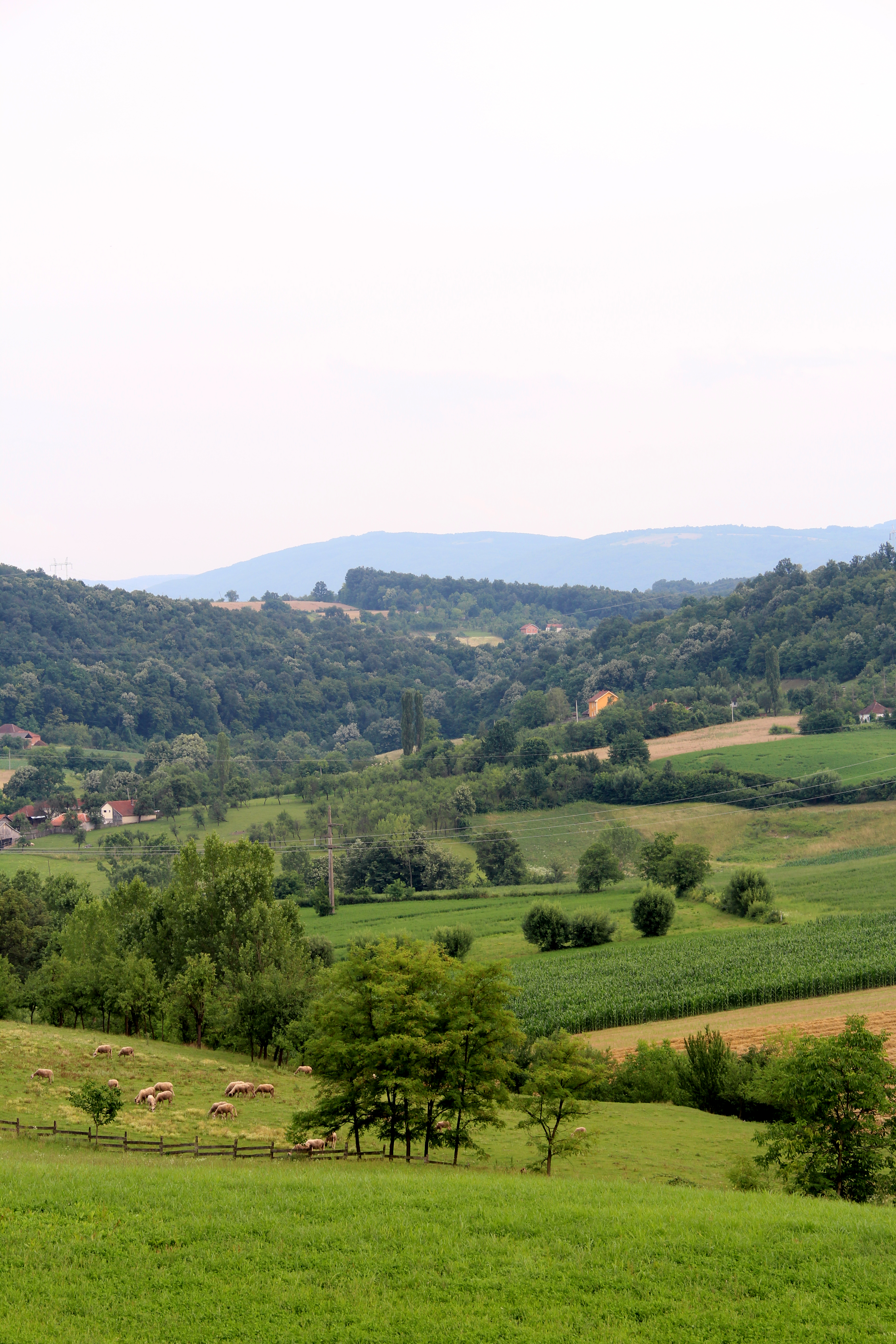
Bujačić - panorama
