= Konarevo =

Konarevo Конарево (Serbian)
- Village (Selo)
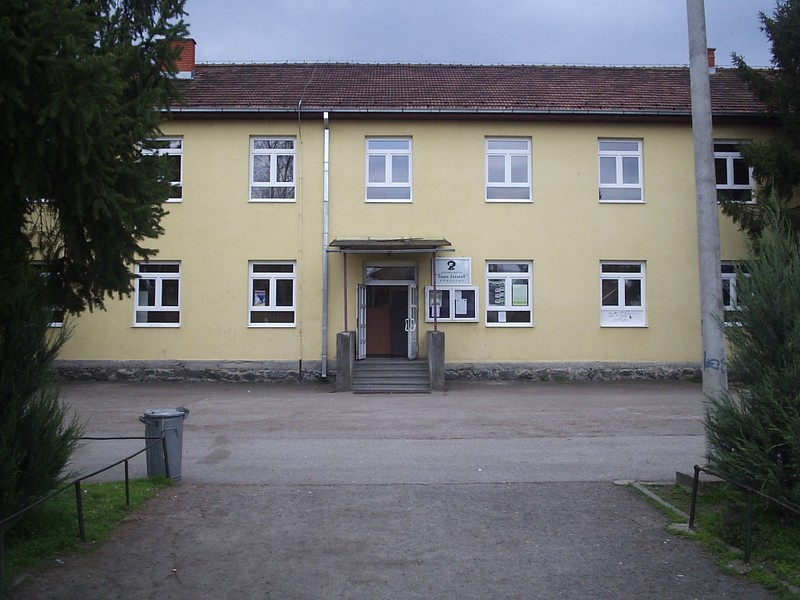
- Elementary school in Konarevo

- Location within Serbia
- Coordinates: 43°42′N 20°36′E
- Country: Serbia
- Municipality: Kraljevo
- Time zone: UTC+1 (CET)
  - Summer (DST): UTC+2 (CEST)

Konarevo is a village situated in Kraljevo municipality in Serbia.
