= Royal Yugoslav Army =

1918–1941 land warfare force

Yugoslav Army
- Jugoslovenska vojska Југословенска војска
- Active: 1918–1941; 1941–1945 (in exile)
- Country: Yugoslavia
- Branch: Land forces
- Type: Army
- Engagements: Revolutions and interventions in Hungary; Austro-Slovene conflict in Carinthia; Christmas uprising; Koplik War; Albanian–Yugoslav border war (1921); World War II; Invasion of Yugoslavia

Commanders
- Notable commanders: Živojin Mišić; Petar Bojović; Petar Pešić; Milan Milovanović; Milan Nedić; Ljubomir Marić; Milutin Nedić; Dušan Simović; Vladimir Cukavac; Petar Kosić; Danilo Kalafatović

Alternate flag of the Royal Yugoslav Army, with Latin script. The text reads "With faith in God, for King and Fatherland".

The Yugoslav Army (Serbo-Croatian: Jugoslovenska vojska, JV, Југословенска војска, ЈВ), commonly the Royal Yugoslav Army, was the principal ground force of the Kingdom of Yugoslavia. It existed from the establishment of Yugoslavia in December 1918 until its surrender to the Axis powers on 17 April 1941. Aside from fighting along the Austrian border in 1919 and 1920 related to territorial disputes, and some border skirmishes on its southern borders in the 1920s, the JV was not involved in fighting until April 1941 when it was quickly overcome by the German-led invasion of Yugoslavia.

Shortly before the invasion, Serbian officers of the Yugoslav General Staff, encouraged by British Special Operations Executive personnel in Belgrade, led a coup d'état against Prince Paul of Yugoslavia and Dragiša Cvetković for adhering to the Tripartite Pact. Beyond the problems of inadequate equipment and incomplete mobilization, the Royal Yugoslav Army suffered badly from the Serbo-Croatian schism in Yugoslav politics. Yugoslavian resistance to the Axis invasion collapsed overnight, primarily due to a large part of the non-Serb population, Croats in particular, being unwilling to offer resistance. In its worst expression, Yugoslavia's defenses were badly compromised on 10 April 1941, when some of the units in the Croat-manned 4th and 7th Armies mutinied, and a newly formed Croatian government hailed the entry of the Germans into Zagreb the same day.

During the Axis occupation of Yugoslavia, the Chetniks of Draža Mihailović were referred to as the "Royal Yugoslav Army in the Fatherland" while the units that escaped to Egypt to rendezvous with the allies following the 1941 invasion were referred to as the Yugoslav Army Outside the Homeland. The Royal Yugoslav Army was formally disbanded on 7 March 1945 when the Yugoslav government-in-exile appointed by Peter II of Yugoslavia was abolished.

== Background ==
The Austro-Hungarian Army exited the First World War after the Armistice of Villa Giusti was struck with the Kingdom of Italy on 3 November 1918. A National Council of Slovenes, Croats and Serbs had been formed in Zagreb in the previous month with the aim of representing the kingdoms of Croatia-Slavonia and Dalmatia, the condominium of Bosnia and Herzegovina, and the Slavic-populated areas of Carniola and Styria. On 1 November 1918 the National Council had established the Department of National Defense, which brought all Austro-Hungarian units on its territory under the command of a new National Army of Slovenes, Croats and Serbs. All affected units of the Common Army, the Imperial-Royal Landwehr and the Royal Croatian Home Guard came under that unified command. Immediately after the Armistice of Villa Giusti, Italy began occupying parts of the Kingdom of Dalmatia that had been promised to it under the secret Treaty of London.

On 1 December 1918 the unification of the State of Slovenes, Croats and Serbs with the Kingdom of Serbia was declared, forming the Kingdom of Serbs, Croats and Slovenes. The Kingdom of Montenegro had already united with Serbia five days earlier. This declaration and firm action by armed groups halted any further encroachments by Italy. The National Council subsequently organised a celebration in Zagreb on 5 December with a Te Deum at the Zagreb Cathedral. Members of the 25th Croatian Home Guard Infantry Regiment and the 53rd Infantry Division held a protest at the same time at the nearby Ban Jelačić Square. The protest was quelled by the police with 15 dead and 17 injured. Both units were subsequently demobilised and disbanded.

== Formation to 1926 ==
At the end of 1918, a Serbian Army mission led by Colonel Dušan Simović, Milan Pribićević and Milisav Antonijević arrived in Zagreb to lead the re-organisation of the Serbian Army and the National Army of Slovenes, Croats and Serbs into a single new Army of the Kingdom of Serbs, Croats and Slovenes (KSCS). The re-organisation talks were led by Pribičević on one side and Mate Drinković and Slavko Kvaternik on the other. They agreed that there would be a new army for the new state, consisting of six regiments. Two of them would be based in Croatia and one in Slovene Lands (specifically in Ljubljana), commanded by Croatian and Slovene officers respectively. The agreement was ignored by Serbian military authorities. Following the December 1918 protest in Zagreb, existing Royal Croatian Home Guard were disbanded. Existing Slovenia-based units of the former Austro-Hungarian armed forces were gradually disbanded over the course of 1919 when the new army was established, led by Serbian generals with Serbian language as the official language. Apart from the name of the army and the emblem worn on the cap, virtually everything else was retained from the Serbian Army, including uniforms, ranks, medals and regulations. Serbian Army symbols were used by the force for a substantial part of 1919. While the Serbian Army officers were automatically transferred to the Army of the KSCS, the former Austro-Hungarian and Croatian Home Guard officers had to apply to be accepted to the force. Non-Serbian officers accepted to the service were often discriminated against.

The Serbian Army numbered 145,225 soldiers at the end of the war, and absorbed the some 15,000 former Austro-Hungarian officers and volunteers which had been organized by the National Council. By 1 January 1919, a total of 134 former high-ranking Austro-Hungarian officers had been retired or relieved of their duties. From late 1918 until 10 September 1919, the new army was involved in a sharp military confrontation with irregular pro-Austrian formations in the region of Carinthia on the northern frontier of the new KSCS. At one point, KSCS troops briefly occupied Klagenfurt. After a plebiscite in October 1920 the frontier with Austria was fixed and tensions subsided. To deal with these security concerns, a large mobilization was carried out from 1918 to 1919, reaching a peak of 450,000 soldiers in July 1919, though demobilization quickly followed.

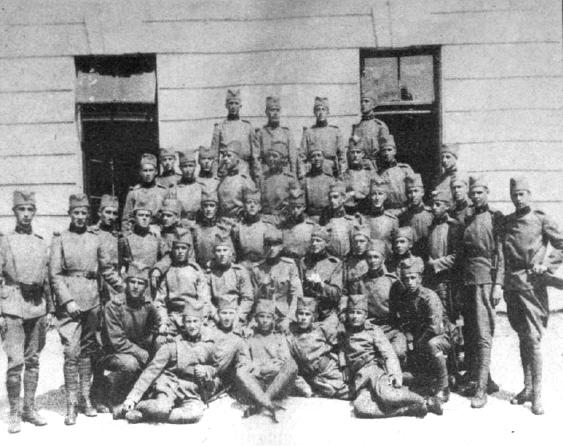
Yugoslav soldiers in 1925

By early 1921 the army organisation had settled into one cavalry division of four regiments, 16 infantry divisions, each consisting of three infantry regiments and one artillery regiment, and additional army-level troops. The 16 infantry divisions were grouped into four numbered army areas, with headquarters at Novi Sad (1st Army), Sarajevo (2nd Army), Skoplje (3rd Army), and Zagreb (4th Army). Later in 1921, a second cavalry division was formed using the four army-level cavalry regiments. Artillery allocation was one heavy artillery regiment and one howitzer regiment at army level, and one field artillery regiment at infantry division level. The army was based on conscription, and annual call-ups were used to maintain the peacetime strength of the army at 140,000. Of the four armies, two were equipped with French-pattern rifles, and the other two used an Austrian model. In the early 1920s, the army responded to several external crises, including the attempted return of King Charles IV to neighbouring Hungary, disturbances along the Albanian border, and incursions from Bulgaria. Despite high standards of discipline and individual training, the army was unable to conduct large-scale mobilisation due to threats on all frontiers, lack of funds, poor railway infrastructure, lack of suitably trained and qualified officers, and shortage of arms, munitions, clothing and equipment.

In 1922, the allocation of artillery within the army was enhanced using material captured in World War I. The result was that the army-level artillery was stripped of its howitzer regiments, which were used to increase the division-level field artillery regiments to brigade strength in eight of the 16 infantry divisions. In the same year, the peacetime strength of the army was reduced to 100,000, and the Ministry of War was trimmed by handing over the frontier troops to the Minister of Finance and transferring the gendarmerie to the Ministry of Interior. From the earliest days of the army, a clique of officers known as the White Hand, were actively engaged in politics. In 1923, the liability for service in the army were changed so that all citizens were liable to service from 21 to 50 years of age, in the active army from 21 to 40 years of age and in the reserve army from 40 to 50 years of age. Service in the standing army was set at one-and-a-half years, and three general ranks were introduced instead of the previous single rank. One year after their disbandment, border disturbances made it necessary to reconstitute a smaller contingent of frontier troops in the 3rd Army area. A total of 32 companies were therefore raised and stationed along the borders with Albania, Bulgaria and Greece. In 1923, the only non-Serb generals in the army retired, and the number of generals in the army was increased from 26 to more than 100 by the promotion of colonels into the lower general ranks of brigadni đeneral (brigadier general) and divizijski đeneral (divisional general). In 1924, the artillery strength of the remaining eight infantry divisions were brought up to brigade strength.

In 1925, a Guards division was formed, consisting of two regiments of cavalry, and one regiment each of infantry and artillery. It was commanded by Petar Živković, a founder of the White Hand. The first significant acquisition of military aircraft were made in the same year, with 150 Breguet 19 light bomber and aerial reconnaissance biplanes being purchased from France under the terms of a loan. Extensions were also made to the arsenal at Kragujevac in 1925, but the previous deficiencies in the army continued to plague the force, with the result that despite its size, the army could not be expected to contend with a smaller and more modern force for any significant time. In 1926, the 5th Army was created, utilising two divisions from the 1st Army and one from the 4th Army. In the same year, 13 more companies of frontier troops were raised for deployment along the Hungarian and Italian borders, and 12 Dornier floatplanes were also purchased.

== 1927–1932 ==
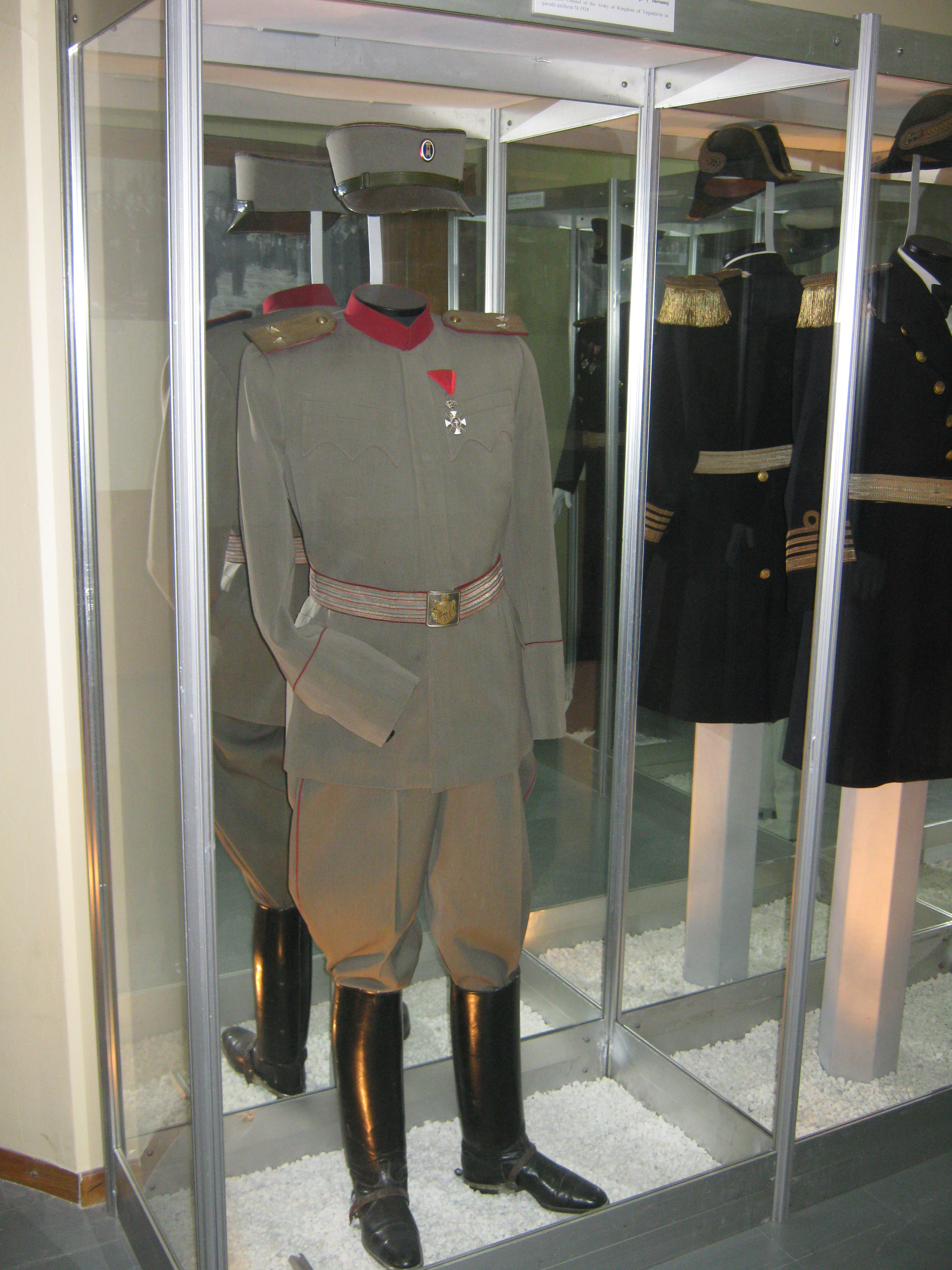
Royal Yugoslav Army officers' uniform

The first manoeuvres of any significant size since the formation of the army in 1919 were conducted between the troops of two divisions during 29 September to 2 October 1927, although the number of troops engaged did not exceed 10,000 and some reserves had to be called up to achieve this number. Prior to this, only local inter-garrison exercises had been conducted. The method adopted for the exercises and the tactics used were similar to those used by the British Army before the Second Boer War. In 1928, four new infantry regiments were established in response to an Italian buildup along the frontier. These were seen as the nucleus for a potential new infantry division. The arsenal at Kragujevac also went into operation, producing Mauser M24 series rifles and ammunition. In January 1929, King Alexander established a personal dictatorship and appointed Živković as prime minister. In April, thirty-two generals were forcibly retired, including the chief of the General Staff, Petar Pešić. During that year, the army took delivery of 4,000 light machine guns, eighty 75 mm (3.0 in) field guns and 200,000 vz. 24 rifles from the Czech firm Škoda. The latter meant that the standing army could finally be equipped with a single type of rifle. The year also saw three inter-divisional exercises conducted, although reports indicated that they were poorly organised and carried out.

In 1930, Živković was promoted to Armijski đeneral, and four out of the five army commanders were changed. There was only one Croat or Slovene in the general ranks, and he was an engineer in an unimportant post. Acquisition of about 800 modern artillery pieces of various calibres was also undertaken, again from Czechoslovakia, and another 100,000 rifles were purchased from Belgium. Despite this new equipment, the army remained deficient in light and heavy machine guns, motor transport, signalling and bridging equipment, and tanks. Inter-division manoeuvres were again undertaken in three regions, but cavalry charges and massed infantry attacks demonstrated that the army had not learned the lessons of World War I. In the view of the British military attaché, the clique of Serbian officers in charge of the army at this time were narrow-minded and conservative men who, while keen to modernise the equipment of the army, did not see the need to modernise its tactics or organisation, and were unwilling to learn from others. During following year, a machine gun company was created in each infantry battalion, and both the Savska (Zagreb) and Dravska (Ljubljana) divisions converted one of their infantry regiments into a mountain infantry regiment. This latter development was intended as the first step to creating two independent formations that, with integral artillery, signals and transport elements, could be used along the mountainous northwest frontier. The year saw no military exercises, even the recent inter-divisional manoeuvres being foregone due to the international financial crisis. The British military attaché observed that the army lacked the sound system of battalion and regimental training needed to thoroughly prepare units for modern warfare, as training consisted mainly of close order drill, basic marksmanship and a small number of field firing exercises.

In 1932, Živković resigned as Prime Minister and from official politics, and returned to the command of the Guards Division. Some communist activity was detected within the army during the year, and the same conservative group of senior Serb officers remained firmly in charge. The two independent mountain brigades completed formation in 1932, each provided with two batteries of 75 mm (3.0 in) guns. The exclusively Serb Chetnik organisation led by Kosta Pećanac formed new detachments in various parts of the country. From a military perspective, it was intended that the Chetniks would assist the frontier guards in peacetime, in addition to their traditional guerilla activities in times of war. Three anti-aircraft regiments were formed in the same year.

== 1933–1937 ==
In early 1933, there was a war scare regarding Italy and Hungary which greatly concerned the General Staff. The British military attaché observed that the army had great self-belief, its infantry was tough and its artillery was well-equipped, but it greatly lacked in significant areas required by a modern fighting force. Key deficiencies remained in machine guns and infantry guns, and there was no combined arms training. The attaché further observed that, along with the almost complete Serb domination of the general ranks, the General Staff was also 90 per cent Serb, and "Serbianisation" of the army had continued, with young educated Croats and Slovenes now reluctant to enter the army. The attaché saw the Serb domination of the army as a possible political weakness for the nation, but also a military weakness in time of war. Three Croat officers were promoted to the rank of brigadni đeneral during the year. There were also reductions in the numbers of artillery regiments and batteries, and infantry battalions and companies, due to significantly lower conscription numbers for 1933, which were caused by the Balkan Wars twenty years earlier. Three more anti-aircraft regiments were formed, and an independent command was created for Šibenik in Dalmatia. Long-term shortages in officers and non-commissioned officers (NCOs) remained, with deficiencies of 3,500 officers and 7,300 NCOs. Disturbances in the Macedonian region resulted in the issue of 25,000 rifles to members of the Serb-nationalist paramilitary force Narodna Odbrana.

In June 1934, Army general Milan Nedić became Chief of the General Staff, replacing Milovanović. King Alexander appointed Nedić to carry through a significant change in army organisation against the opposition of many of the senior generals, mainly to reduce the size of the oversized infantry divisions and create corps as an intermediate formation between divisions and armies. After Alexander's assassination, Nedić decided to defer the changes, citing practical difficulties. A chemical warfare battalion was also formed, with the intention of providing each army with one company. Trials were also undertaken with Skoda tankettes and a locally designed automatic rifle. It was announced that army-level manoeuvres would be held in 1935, for the first time since the formation of the army in 1919. A commission formed to examine the issue of mechanisation of the army concluded that the terrain of much of the country and the weakness of existing bridges meant that motorisation and mechanisation should be developed slowly, but that a light truck should be acquired as a first step. Reserves of ammunition of all types were reported as low.

In 1935, estimates were made that within a month of mobilisation, 800,000 to 900,000 soldiers could be placed under arms. This was based on the duplication of eight of the sixteen standing infantry divisions and of the alpine division, and the formation of an additional cavalry division, resulting in a total of 24 infantry divisions of about 25,000 men each, one guards division, two alpine divisions and three cavalry divisions. This year saw significant changes in the higher command of the army following the creation of the Military Council. Nedić became a member of the Military Council and was replaced by Army General Ljubomir Marić as Chief of the General Staff. Six infantry regiments were disbanded, but the General Staff decided to stick with four infantry regiments per infantry division. Equipment received during the year included 800 Stokes mortars, enough Skoda anti-aircraft guns to arm 20 batteries, and six Škoda Š-I-D tankettes. Deficiencies in radio communications were apparent, with the infantry needing between 1,000 and 2,000 small sets, and the cavalry being completely lacking in radios. The radios issued to artillery units were unable to communicate with aircraft, and were therefore of little use. The British military attaché observed that even the most senior commanders have never handled a force larger than a division on exercises or in war. The 1935 manoeuvres were the first of any type since 1930, and the first above divisional level since the formation of the army in 1919. They took place on the Sava river between Novi Sad and Sarajevo at the end of September, and were really in the form of a demonstration rather than a war game. There was no freedom of action for commanders, and control was rigid.

During 1936, Marić became Minister of the Army and Navy, replacing Živković, who had been intriguing against the government. Before this occurred Marić had told the British naval and military attachés that any mobilisation of the army would take 25 days, and revealed that shortfalls in many items of equipment were severe, including gas masks, steel helmets, tents, horseshoes, small arms ammunition, saddlery and tanks. The new Chief of the General Staff was Armijski đeneral Milutin Nedić, brother of Milan, who had been the General Officer Commanding the Royal Yugoslav Air Force. The major organisational change during the year was the formation of a tank battalion, consisting of three companies, each of three platoons of five tanks. The only tankettes in service at this time were Renault FTs operated by a training company, but an order for new tanks had been submitted. Large-scale manoeuvres were carried out in Slovenia in September 1937, involving the equivalent of four divisions, and exposing to foreign observers the serious deficiencies in the army, caused by incompetent General Staff and the senior commanders, a lack of technical training of regimental officers in modern warfare, and across-the-board shortages of arms and equipment of almost every type. The British military attaché observed that the army was not capable of undertaking any large-scale operations outside of the country, but if fully mobilised would be able to give a good account of itself in a defensive campaign. The exercise was conducted in Slovenia to test the loyalty and value of Slovene and Croat reservists, and was completely satisfactory in this respect only, with nearly all of the reservists reporting for duty and bearing the hardships of the exercise with "discipline and fortitude". The same year saw the delivery of a substantial amount of equipment from Czechoslovakia, including 36 mountain guns, 32 anti-aircraft guns, 60 reconditioned howitzers, 80 field guns, and eight Škoda S-1d tankettes. Considerable work was being undertaken building fortifications on the Italian frontier.

== Prelude to war ==
During 1938, Milutin Nedić was appointed as Minister of the Army and Navy, and was replaced as Chief of the General Staff by Armijski đeneral Dušan Simović. That year, two geo-strategic changes made the task of the army significantly more difficult, the Anschluss between Germany and Austria, and the Munich Agreement which drastically weakened Czechoslovakia. These changes meant that Yugoslavia now had a common frontier with Germany and its most significant supplier of arms and munitions was under threat. It was the assessment of the British military attaché that the army could stem the tide of an invasion by one of its neighbours acting alone, with the possible exception of Germany, and could also deal with a combined Italian and Hungarian attack. During the year, a Coastal Defence Command was raised using troops already stationed along the Yugoslav coastline, and did not involve the creation of new formations. Delivery of 10,000 light machine guns from Czechoslovakia was completed during the year, which meant that the army was fully equipped with rifles and light machine guns. Further fortification was undertaken along the Italian border, and plans were developed to fortify the former Austrian border. Of the 165 generals in the army in 1938, two were Croats and two were Slovenes, the rest were Serbs.

During the interwar period, the Yugoslav military budget expended 30 per cent of government outlays. By January 1939, the army, when mobilised, and including reserves, numbered 1,457,760 men, with fighting formations including 30 infantry divisions, one guards division, and three cavalry divisions. In late 1940, the army mobilised troops in Macedonia and parts of Serbia along the border with Albania.

== April 1941 Campaign ==
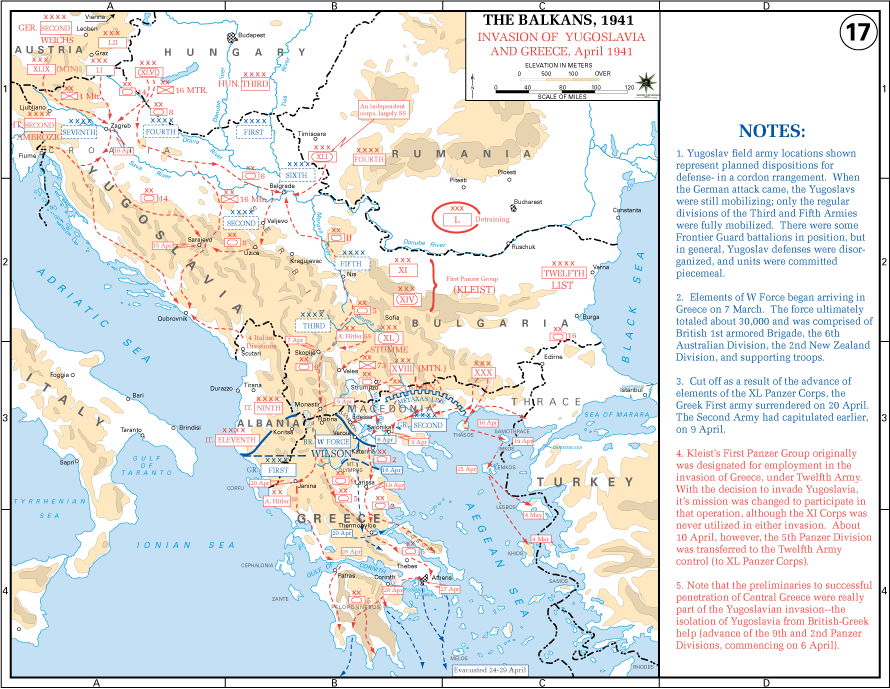
A map of the invasion of Yugoslavia, April 1941

Formed after World War I, the Royal Yugoslav Army was still largely equipped with weapons and material from that era, although some modernization with Czech equipment and vehicles had begun. Of about 4,000 artillery pieces, many were aged and horse-drawn, but about 1,700 were relatively modern, including 812 Czech 37mm and 47mm anti-tank guns. There were also about 2,300 mortars, including 1,600 modern 81 millimetres (3.2 in) pieces, as well as twenty-four 220 millimetres (8.7 in) and 305 millimetres (12.0 in) pieces. Of 940 anti-aircraft guns, 360 were 15 millimetres (0.59 in) and 20 millimetres (0.79 in) Czech and Italian models. All of these arms were imported, from different sources, which meant that the various models often lacked proper repair and maintenance facilities. The only mechanized units were 6 motorized infantry battalions in the three cavalry divisions, six motorized artillery regiments, two tank battalions equipped with 110 tanks, one of which had Renault FT models of World War I origin and the other 54 modern French Renault R35 tanks, plus an independent tank company with eight Czech SI-D tank destroyers. Some 1,000 trucks for military purposes had been imported from the United States in the months just preceding the invasion.

Fully mobilized, the Royal Yugoslav Army could have put 28 infantry divisions, three cavalry divisions, and 35 independent regiments in the field. Of the independent regiments, 16 were in frontier fortifications and 19 were organized as combined detachments, around the size of a reinforced brigade. Each detachment had one to three infantry regiments and one to three artillery battalions, with three organised as "alpine" units. The German attack, however, caught the army still mobilizing, and only some eleven divisions were in their planned defense positions at the start of the invasion. The total strength of the Royal Yugoslav Army at full mobilization was about 1,200,000 however only around 50 per cent of the recruits were able to join their units before the German invasion. By 20 March 1941, its total mobilized strength amounted to 600,000. On the eve of the invasion, there were 167 Generals on the Yugoslav active list. Of these, 150 were Serbs, 8 Croats, and 9 Slovenes.

The Royal Yugoslav Army was organized into three army groups and the coastal defense troops. The 3rd Army Group was the strongest with the 3rd, 3rd Territorial, 5th and 6th Armies defending the borders with Romania, Bulgaria and Albania. The 2nd Army Group with the 1st and 2nd Armies, defended the region between the Iron Gates and the Drava River. The 1st Army Group with the 4th and 7th Armies, composed mainly of Croatian troops, was in Croatia and Slovenia defending the Italian, German (Austrian) and Hungarian frontiers.

The strength of each "Army" amounted to little more than a corps, with the three Army Groups consisting of the units deployed as follows; The 3rd Army Group's 3rd Army consisted of four infantry divisions and one cavalry detachment; the 3rd Territorial Army with three infantry divisions and one independent motorized artillery regiment; the 5th Army with four infantry divisions, one cavalry division, two detachments and one independent motorized artillery regiment and the 6th Army with three infantry divisions, the two Royal Guards detachments and three infantry detachments. The 2nd Army Group's 1st Army had one infantry and one cavalry division, three detachments and six frontier defence regiments; the 2nd Army had three infantry divisions and one frontier defence regiment. Finally, the 1st Army Group consisted of the 4th Army, with three infantry divisions and one detachment, whilst the 7th Army had two infantry divisions, one cavalry division, three mountain detachments, two infantry detachments and nine frontier defence regiments. The Strategic, "Supreme Command" Reserve in Bosnia comprised four infantry divisions, four independent infantry regiments, one tank battalion, two motorized engineer battalions, two motorized heavy artillery regiments, fifteen independent artillery battalions and two independent anti-aircraft artillery battalions. The Coastal Defence Force, on the Adriatic opposite Zadar comprised one infantry division and two detachments, in addition to fortress brigades and anti-aircraft units at Šibenik and Kotor.

Along with other Yugoslav forces, the Royal Yugoslav Army surrendered on 17 April 1941 to an invading force of Germans, Italians, and Hungarians. Subsequently, a unit titled "1st Battalion, Royal Yugoslav Guards" was formed in Alexandria, Egypt. This unit saw action in North Africa with the 4th Indian Division but was later disbanded in Italy in 1944 as its strength dwindled and the unit was plagued by infighting between royalist and pro-Josip Broz Tito factions. During 1943–44, 27 men made up the "No. 7 (Yugoslav) Troop" of the 10th (Inter-Allied) Commando, a special forces unit under British command. In November 1943, the Yugoslav Detachment was established as part of the 512th Bombardment Squadron of the United States Army Air Forces. The detachment consisted of 40 Yugoslav aviators and was disbanded in August 1945. All Royal Yugoslav Forces were formally disbanded on March 7, 1945, when King Peter II's government was abolished in Yugoslavia.

== Flags ==
Standard of the rank of field marshal.

Standard of the rank of army general.

Standard of the rank of division general.

Standard of the rank of brigade general.

== See also ==
- Royal Yugoslav Air Force
- Royal Yugoslav Navy
- Yugoslav Partisans
- Yugoslav Ground Forces
