= 5th Army (Kingdom of Yugoslavia) =

Royal Yugoslav Army formation (1941)

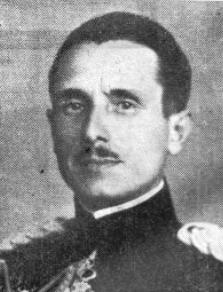
- Armijski đeneral Vladimir Cukavac commanded the Yugoslav 5th Army during the Axis invasion of Yugoslavia
- Active: 1941
- Disbanded: 1941
- Country: Kingdom of Yugoslavia
- Branch: Royal Yugoslav Army
- Type: Infantry
- Size: Corps (Note: The Royal Yugoslav Army did not field corps, but their armies consisted of several divisions, and were therefore corps-sized.)
- Engagements: Invasion of Yugoslavia

Commanders
- Notable commanders: Vladimir Cukavac

The 5th Army was a Royal Yugoslav Army formation which commanded five divisions and two independent detachments during the German-led Axis invasion of the Kingdom of Yugoslavia in April 1941 during World War II. It was commanded by General Vladimir Cukavac, and was responsible for the Romanian and Bulgarian borders between the Iron Gates and the Greek border.

== Background ==
A map showing the location of Yugoslavia in Europe

The Kingdom of Serbs, Croats and Slovenes was created with the merger of Serbia, Montenegro and the South Slav-inhabited areas of Austria-Hungary on 1 December 1918, in the immediate aftermath of World War I. The Army of the Kingdom of Serbs, Croats and Slovenes was established to defend the new state. It was formed around the nucleus of the victorious Royal Serbian Army, as well as armed formations raised in regions formerly controlled by Austria-Hungary. Many former Austro-Hungarian officers and soldiers became members of the new army. From the beginning, much like other aspects of public life in the new kingdom, the army was dominated by ethnic Serbs, who saw it as a means by which to secure Serb political hegemony.

The army's development was hampered by the kingdom's poor economy, and this continued during the 1920s. In 1929, King Alexander changed the name of the country to the Kingdom of Yugoslavia, at which time the army was renamed the Royal Yugoslav Army (Serbo-Croatian Latin: Vojska Kraljevine Jugoslavije, VKJ). The army budget remained tight, and as tensions rose across Europe during the 1930s, it became difficult to secure weapons and munitions from other countries. Consequently, at the time World War II broke out in September 1939, the VKJ had several serious weaknesses, which included reliance on draught animals for transport, and the large size of its formations. Infantry divisions had a wartime strength of 26,000–27,000 men, as compared to contemporary British infantry divisions of half that strength. These characteristics resulted in slow, unwieldy formations, and the inadequate supply of arms and munitions meant that even the very large Yugoslav formations had low firepower. Generals better suited to the trench warfare of World War I were combined with an army that was neither equipped nor trained to resist the fast-moving combined arms approach used by the Germans in their invasions of Poland and France.

The weaknesses of the VKJ in strategy, structure, equipment, mobility and supply were exacerbated by serious ethnic disunity within Yugoslavia, resulting from two decades of Serb hegemony and the attendant lack of political legitimacy achieved by the central government. Attempts to address the disunity came too late to ensure that the VKJ was a cohesive force. Fifth column activity was also a serious concern, not only from the Croatian fascist Ustaše and the ethnic German minorities but also potentially from the pro-Bulgarian Macedonians and the Albanian population of Kosovo.

== Mobilization and composition ==
=== Mobilization ===
The 5th Army was to be organized and mobilized on a geographic basis from the peacetime 5th Army District, which was divided into three divisional districts, each of which was subdivided into regimental regions. The first countrywide mobilization in Yugoslavia commenced in September 1939 after the German invasion of Poland. Between two and four infantry regiments were raised in every divisional district; all cavalry regiments, most artillery divizions and Border Guard units were also raised. This mobilization was unsuccessful as the Yugoslav Army lacked military equipment, especially transport vehicles and animals. The mobilization method also proved to be ineffective and all units were demobilized after several months. The next mobilization in the 5th Army District commenced on 12 November 1940, two weeks after Italy invaded Greece. In the 5th Army District, the 5th Infantry Division Šumadijska and the 46th Infantry Division Moravska were to be completely mobilized while the 22nd Infantry Division Ibarska, the 9th Infantry Division Timočka, the 8th Infantry Division Krajinska, and the 34th Infantry Division Toplička were to be partly mobilized. The Staff of the 5th Army District assessed mobilized units as "usable" but the units lacked transport vehicles and animals.

After unrelenting pressure from Adolf Hitler, Yugoslavia signed the Tripartite Pact on 25 March 1941. On 27 March, a military coup d'état overthrew the government that had signed the pact, and a new government was formed under the VVKJ commander, Armijski đeneral (Note: Equivalent to a U.S. Army lieutenant general.) Dušan Simović. A general mobilization was not called by the new government until 3 April, not to provoke Germany any further following the coup d'état and precipitate war. On the same day as the coup, Hitler issued Führer Directive 25 which called for Yugoslavia to be treated as a hostile state, and on 3 April, Führer Directive 26 was issued, detailing the plan of attack and command structure for the invasion, which was to commence on 6 April. On 4 April, Ministry of the Army and Navy ordered that all units of the 5th Army conduct a forced march to their positions determined by the war plans. On 6 April, when the invasion of Yugoslavia began, the 34th Infantry Division Toplička and the 50th Infantry Division Drinska were completely mobilized, the 2nd Cavalry Division and the 8th Infantry Division Krajinska were partly mobilized and on their assigned positions, while the 9th Infantry Division Timočka was still in the process of mobilization.

=== Wartime organization ===
The 5th Army was commanded by Armijski đeneral (Note: Equivalent to a U.S. Army lieutenant general.) Vladimir Cukavac, his chief of staff was Pukovnik (Note: Equivalent to a U.S. Army colonel.) Fran Tomše. The 5th Army consisted of:

- 8th Infantry Division Krajinska, commanded by Divizijski đeneral (Note: Equivalent to a U.S. Army major general) Miloje Popadić
- 9th Infantry Division Timočka, commanded by Divizijski đeneral Antonije Stošić
- 34th Infantry Division Toplička, commanded by Divizijski đeneral Vladislav Kostić
- 50th Infantry Division Drinska, commanded by Divizijski đeneral Kosta Đorđević
- 2nd Cavalry Division, commanded by Divizijski đeneral Dimitrije Predić
- Detachment Vlasinski, commanded by Brigadni đeneral (Note: Equivalent to a U.S. Army brigadier general) Pavle Pavlović
- Detachment Kalnski, commanded by Brigadni đeneral Panta Draškić

Army-level support was provided by the 61st and the 113th Artillery Regiments, the 61st Anti-Aircraft Divizion, the 61st Pioneer Battalion, the 61st Pontoon Battalion, the 61st Supplementary Cavalry Divizion, and the 5th Chetnik Battalion. The 2nd Air Reconnaissance Group comprising sixteen obsolete aircraft was attached from the Royal Yugoslav Army Air Force (Serbo-Croatian Latin: Vazduhoplovstvo vojske Kraljevine Jugoslavije, VVKJ) and was based at Sorlince near Leskovac.

== Deployment plan ==
The 5th Army was an independent formation responsible for the defense of the Yugoslav–Bulgarian border north of Bosiljgrad and Yugoslav–Romanian at the Iron Gates. On the left flank of the 5th Army, across Danube, was the 6th Army, an independent formation that was responsible for the defense of the Yugoslav Banat region east of the Tisza. On the right flank of the 5th Army was the 3rd Territorial Army a unit subordinated to 3rd Army Group responsible for the defense of the Yugoslav–Bulgarian border south of Bosiljgrad. Headquarters of the Staff of the 5th Army was located in hotel "Milenković" in Niška Banja. The planned deployment of the 5th Army from north to south was:

- 8th Infantry Division Krajinska at borders with Bulgaria and Romania between peak Vrška Čuka and village Brnjica, 10 km east of Golubac
- 9th Infantry Division Timočka at the border with Bulgaria between Zaječar and Knjaževac
- Detachment Vlasinski at the border with Bulgaria between villages of Žeravino and Klisura
- 2nd Cavalry Division with headquarters in Niš and its units in various places in southeastern Yugoslavia
- 34th Infantry Division Toplička around Pirot, tasked with defending the border with Bulgaria between village Vrapče on Jerma and peak Midžor
- 50th Infantry Division Drinska at the border with Bulgaria between Gramada and Golaš
- Detachment Kalnski at the border with Bulgaria between Midžor and Golaš

== Operations ==
=== 5–7 April ===
At 22:00 on 5 April, German Detachment Đerdap began crossing of the Danube at the Yugoslav–Romanian border in two groups. One group landed at the road Kladovo–Sip at around 2:00, the other group landed at the road Tekija–Sip at the same time. Yugoslav units stationed in Sip were attacked by the group that landed at Kladovo–Sip road and after a short fight Germans held the entire Sip Canal at around 5:00. During this fight, 18 German soldiers were killed while Yugoslavs suffered casualties of 30 killed, including the commander of the company in Sip, Kapetan (Note: Equivalent to a U.S. Army captain.) Staniša Mihajlović. After receiving the news of the German capture of Sip Canal, commander of the 8th ID Krajinska Miloje Popadić ordered the commander of the 8th Supplementary Regiment to form Detachment Brzopalanački by uniting his regiment and one battery of the field artillery. The newly formed detachment was tasked with capturing back Sip Canal.

The 4th Battalion of the 20th Infantry Regiment stationed on Vrška Čuka spotted a column of German units moving from Kula towards Vrška Čuka. The artillery of this column opened fire on the 4th Battalion at around 11:00, after this German tanks commenced attack but they were repulsed by the 123rd Anti-Tank Company which destroyed one tank. At the same time, German infantry began the attack but they were stopped by the heavy fire of the Yugoslav infantry supported by the artillery. Skirmishes in this area continued until the night when German units retreated to Kula.

German units attacked border posts in Bosiljgrad, defended by Detachment Vlasinski, at around 5:30. The attack was successful and they managed to push 5–6 kilometers into the Yugoslav territory.

At 5:00 on 6 April, 20 Luftwaffe Messerschmitt Bf 109Es attacked Sorlince airport, destroying all aircraft of the 2nd Air Reconnaissance Group attached to the 5th Army. An hour later, Luftwaffe attacked Niš airfield, damaging four aircraft of the 610th Eskadrila. During this attack, German flying ace and a commander of I. (Jagd)/LG 2 Herbert Ihlefeld was hit by small arms fire forcing him to crash-land near the village of Donji Dušnik, after which he was imprisoned by the Yugoslav Army. Bombing of Belgrade in the morning of 6 April resulted in the destruction of communication between the Staff of the 5th Army and the Supreme Command of the Yugoslav Army.

At around 20:00 on 6 April, German units attacked a border post at Vuči Del, Yugoslav historian Velimir Terzić claims that the border post was captured by the Germans and re-captured by the Yugoslavs on 7 April while the Supreme Command had information that border post was not captured on 6 or 7 April. German documents remark that Yugoslav units conducted an attack 3 kilometers northwest of the village of Miloslavtsi in Bulgaria. Another border attack occurred on the front held by 34th ID Toplička, German units supported by Bulgarian border guard attacked the village of Vrapče and were quickly repulsed by the Yugoslav border guard units. Most pressure during 7 April was put on front held by Detachment Vlasinski where German units pushed 2–3 kilometers into Yugoslav territory from Žeravino

=== 8 April ===
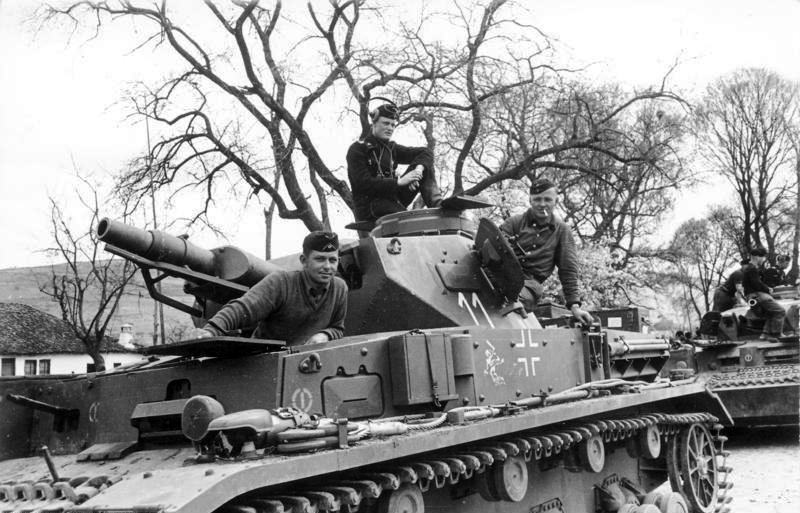
Tanks of the 11th Panzer Division during the invasion of Yugoslavia

Three divisions of the Panzer Group 1 began an attack on a front held by partially mobilized 34th ID Toplička at 5:30 on 8 April. The 11th Panzer Division attacked just south of Nišava river, the 294th Infantry Division began its assault from village of Krupac towards Pirot, and the 4th Mountain Division assaulted towards Pirot from Visočka Ržana. Commander of 34th ID Toplička Vladislav Kostić ordered his units to open artillery fire on 11th Panzer Division after he was informed of its attack. Two artillery batteries opened fire destroying and damaging 30 vehicles of the German tank column. At around 6:30, the panzer division reached Caribrod, capturing it after around 45 minutes of battle. After the fall of Caribrod, the 61st Artillery Regiment opened fire on the tanks, while it didn't manage to do much damage, it slowed down German advance. The 11th Panzer Division also encountered heavy resistance from 3rd Infantry Regiment, which repulsed several attacks. German tanks were soon reinforced by the infantry which attacked the 3rd Regiment at the left flank, near the village of Srećkovac.

The 2nd Battalion of the 3rd Regiment, located on the left flank of the regiment, began retreating at around 10:45 after being attacked from the air. This left an open route to Pirot and also left artillery of the division undefended. After destroying two nearby artillery batteries, German tanks assaulted towards village of Sukovo where most of the artillery was located. After reaching Sukovo, they destroyed three batteries located there and killed or imprisoned most of artillerymen, losing 2 tanks during the battles. After destroying the artillery, the 11th Panzer Division advanced towards Pirot undisturbed, entering the city at 14:30. In Pirot, only resistance was put by one anti-aircraft platoon which damaged one tank while one of its soldiers was killed.

The 294th Infantry Division attacked middle section of the front held by the 34th ID Toplička, which was defended by the 12th Infantry Regiment. The regiment, supported by two artillery batteries, successfully repulsed German attacks until around 10:30 when 4th Mountain Division attacked left flank of the regiment, forcing it to start retreating. The regiment managed to hold its position until 15:00 when its commander ordered a retreat, but with the capture of Pirot, the regiment was encircled. Elements of the 4th Mountain Division attacked regiment's artillery positions, destroying its two batteries. German battles with the regiment lasted until 17:00–18:00 when most of the regiment was captured and a small part managed to break the encirclement. Breakthrough of the front held by the 34th ID Toplička left an open route to Niš. In order to at least slow down the German advance towards Niš, Staff of the 5th Army sent remains of the 34th ID Toplička and several units from the army reserves to Bela Palanka. Only one regiment reached Bela Palanka before the Germans and put up a shot-lasting resistance in the village of Ponor at 23:30. Bela Palanka fell at 2:00 next day.

After the fall of Pirot, Staff of the 5th Army ordered a retreat of the Detachment Vlasinski, 50th ID Drinska, the 2nd Cavalry Division, and the remains of the 34th ID Toplička to the left bank of South Morava river. Fall of Bela Palanka made the Staff of the 5th Army in danger so it moved from Niška Banja to Kruševac during the night of 8–9 April.

=== 9–10 April ===
Early in the morning of 9 April, the 11th Panzer Division continued their advance from Bela Palanka to Niš. After defeating several small units stationed east of Niš, the Germans entered the city at around 11:00. Immediately after capturing Niš, most of the 11th Panzer Division continued advancing to the north, towards Aleksinac. Smaller parts of the division were directed to the south, towards Doljevac, and to the west, towards Prokuplje. Defense of Aleksinac was organized by Detachment Aleksinački, formed by smaller units of the 2nd Cavalry Division. The detachment was organized in an echelon formation between the village of Bujmir and Aleksinac. After the detachment was defeated, it retreated to Deligrad where it also put up resistance, and after being defeated there it retreated to the left bank of South Morava. Route from Niš towards Prokuplje was also defended by the elements of the 2nd Cavalry Division which formed Detachment Mramorski stationed in the village of Mramor. There they fought against elements of the 11th Panzer Division, eventually forcing them to retreat back to Niš.

On 9 April, Staff of the 5th Division retreated further, leaving Kruševac for Vrnjačka Banja at noon and traveling to Kraljevo during the night of 9–10 April. Before leaving Kruševac, the staff ordered Detachment Kalnski, 8th ID Krajinska, and 9th ID Timočka to retreat the left bank of South Morava and Great Morava rivers. This detachment and two divisions had already begun retreating during the previous night, while they were troubled by harsh weather, the units weren't attacked.

During 10 April, the Staff of the 5th Army retreated from Kraljevo to Čačak and it completely lost contact with Detachment Vlasinski, 8th ID Krajinska, 9th ID Timočka, and the 50th ID Drinska. After finding about its further retreat, the Yugoslav Supreme Command ordered Armijski đeneral Cukavac to return to Kraljevo with his staff. This was done at 23:00 on the same day.

Elements of the 11th Panzer Division continued their advance to the north in the morning of 10 April. After defeating two anti-tank companies near Ćićevac, they continued north, towards Paraćin where they defeated an anti-aircraft battery and captured the town. North of Paraćin, at Ćuprija, the division fought against the 8th Cavalry Divizion of the 8th ID Krajinska, which retreated after destroying one tank. Germans encountered next resistance at the village of Jovac, from cadets of the non-commissioned artillery officer school. This resistance was defeated and Germans continued their advance towards Jagodina, where citizens had already placed stone barricades and were armed by the vice president of the municipality. The only military unit stationed in the city was one platoon. Heavy fighting in the streets began at either 9:00 or 9:30 and ended at 10:30. During this battle, 30 Yugoslavs were killed of whom 21 were soldiers and the rest were citizens defending the city. From Jagodina, the Germans advanced towards Kragujevac. They were slowed down at the village of Bunar by two artillery batteries of 9th ID Timočka and a firefighter company which blockaded the road with two trucks, after a half an hour long battle Yugoslav units retreated. Germans continued their advance towards Kragujevac after this battle but they were stopped by heavy artillery fire from the city at the village of Gornja Sabanta, where they spent the night.

In the morning of 10 April, weaker elements of the 11th Panzer Division attacked two infantry battalions of the Detachment Vlasinski and the 50th ID Drinska stationed in Leskovac. This attack was repulsed northwards and the two battalions, joined by one more infantry battalion and one mountain battery, formed the Detachment Leskovački. After defeating two more German attacks, this detachment retreated to Lebane during the night of 10–11 April.

=== 11–12 April ===
After receiving reinforcements during the night, German forces stationed at Gornja Sabanta mounted an assault towards Kragujevac in the morning of 11 April. (Note: Poručnik (Note: Equivalent to a U.S. Army first lieutenant.) Joakim Sukno claims that the German attack began at 5:00, while Divizijski đeneral Mihailo Bodi states that at 7:50 he had a telephone call with an officer stationed in Kragujevac, who said that they still don't have any data on the German forces and he didn't mention the attack.) They defeated several battalions and batteries at Donja Sabanta and reached the right bank of the river Lepenica in Kragujevac. Germans encountered heavy resistance while crossing the three bridges on the river and during the battle for the city center. The city was captured at 13:30 that day. After capturing the city, they sent scouting missions towards Knić. One the groups sent on sent on a scouting mission, composed of one armored car and three tanks, encountered a one Yugoslav infantry battalion which forced them to retreat back to Kragujevac after destroying the armored car.

During 11 April, while it was retreating to the west, the Staff of the 50th ID Drinska lost connection with its subordinate units, most of which gathered in Lebane together with the units of Detachment Vlasinski. Soldiers of these units were demoralized and commanders of two regiments considered surrender. Commander of the 65th Infantry Regiment decided not to surrender after a consultation with battalion commanders of his regiment, while parts of the 5th Infantry Regiment headed towards Valjevo where they surrendered to the Germans. Other units of the 50th ID Drinska continued their retreat towards Prokuplje, Blace and Kuršumlija.

The units of the 9th ID Timočka gathered at Soko Banja during 11 April. In the afternoon, one detachment of the 11th Panzer Division attacked one Yugoslav battalion and a battery at the village of Bovan, near Soko Banja. Yugoslav forces were victorious and completely destroyed the detachment, capturing 25 soldiers, two tanks, two anti-aircraft guns, and six motorcycles.

In the morning of 12 April, the Commander of the 5th Army Armijski đeneral Cukavac was replaced by Divizijski đeneral Miroslav Tomić. After becoming a new commander, Tomić ordered a reorganization of the units of the 1st Infantry Division Cerska which was put under the command of the 5th Army on 9 April. He also sent airplane carrying orders to the 5th Army units with whom the staff lost contact, only the airplane carrying orders for the 8th ID Krajinska managed to reach the division.

At around 7:00 on 12 April, German armored and infantry units attacked Detachment Blacki of the 2nd Cavalry Division stationed at Blace. The detachment held out for around three hours, when its left wing was defeated and it started withdrawing. The unorganized withdrawal caused the destruction of the detachment and the capture of most high-ranking officials in the detachment. During the same morning, Detachment Knićki, part of the 1st ID Cerska, mounted an assault towards Kragujevac. It encountered German forces at the villages of Korićani and Grošnica. Battle there lasted until twilight, when German artillery opened fire on Yugoslav units from all sides, forcing them to retreat.

The 50th ID Drinska and Detachment Vlasinski were encircled by 5th Armored Division during 12 April. Around 3,500 unarmed soldiers from 50th ID Drinska managed to escape encirclement and group up between Brus and Aleksandrovac, from where they were directed to an area west of Kraljevo. Rest of the division managed to retreat to the valley of West Morava where it united with Detachment Trstenički. Meanwhile, commander of Detachment Vlasinski Brigadni đeneral Pavle Pavlović held a conference with regimental commanders in his detachment, General Staff officers and senator Miloš Dragović. On the conference, it was decided that units of Detachment Vlasinski will be disbanded.

During the evening of 12 April, commander of the 8th ID Krajinska Miloje Popadić, commander of the divisional staff Radovan Sokol and commander of the 312th Reserve Army Regiment Anta Živulović were captured by German reconnaissance group while they were traveling towards troops of Živulović's regiment, stationed near Dobro Polje.

=== 13–15 April ===
On 13 April, units of the 60th Motorized Division advanced towards Kruševac, it defeated cavalry unit stationed at Kaonik and it reached the village of Gaglovo. In the meantime, Major Dimitrije Stanojević set off from Kruševac towards Jankova klisura with his cavalry divizion and soldiers of broken-up Detachment Blacki who retreated to Kruševac. At around 14:00, they arrived at Razbojna, where other parts of broken-up Detachment Blacki were stationed. An hour later, commander of 2nd Cavalry Division Dimitrije Predić ordered formation of Detachment Razbojni from the units stationed at Razbojna.

Detachment Gornjomilanovački, part of the 1st ID Cerska, engaged in a battle with German motorized and armored column on 13 April. Two different narratives of this battle exist, one is told by commander of an artillery divizion of the detachment Dalibor Bumber and the other one is told by commander of the 1st ID Cerska Milorad Majstorović. According to Bumber, German column of around 50 vehicles was spotted at around 13:00 and Yugoslav artillery immediately opened fire. The battle lasted until around 15:00 when both sides stopped attacking, Bumber claims to have seen three German tanks on fire while for the Yugoslav casualties he gives an account of two destroyed artillery pieces, four dead and twelve injured soldiers as well as a large number of dead and injured horses. Majstorović gives number of German vehicles as around 30 and says that battle lasted from midday until dark. He states that Yugoslav artillery destroyed five tanks, several motorcycles and few trucks.
