= Ponor (disambiguation) =

Ponor is an opening in karst landscapes where surface water enters into underground passages.

Ponor may also refer to:

== Places ==
- Ponor, Alba, a commune in Romania
- Ponor, a village in Pui Commune, Hunedoara County, Romania
- Ponor, a river in Bihor County and Cluj County, Romania, tributary of the Someșul Cald
- Ponor (Miniș), a river in Caraș-Severin County, Romania, tributary of the Miniș
- Ponor (Nerskaya), a river in Moscow Oblast, Russia, tributary of the Nerskaya
- Ponor, Sofia Province, a village near Kostinbrod, Sofia Province, Bulgaria
- Ponor Mountains, mountainous karst area of the Balkan Mountains in Bulgaria
- Ponor (Knjaževac), a village in Serbia
- Ponor (Pirot), a village in Serbia
- Ponor, Olovo, a village in Bosnia and Herzegovina
- Ponor (Pale), a village in Bosnia and Herzegovina
- Ponor Saddle, Antarctica

== Surname ==
- Cătălina Ponor (b. 1987), a Romanian gymnast
