= Untreue =

River in Brilon, Germany

Coordinates: 51.3958°N 8.6300°E

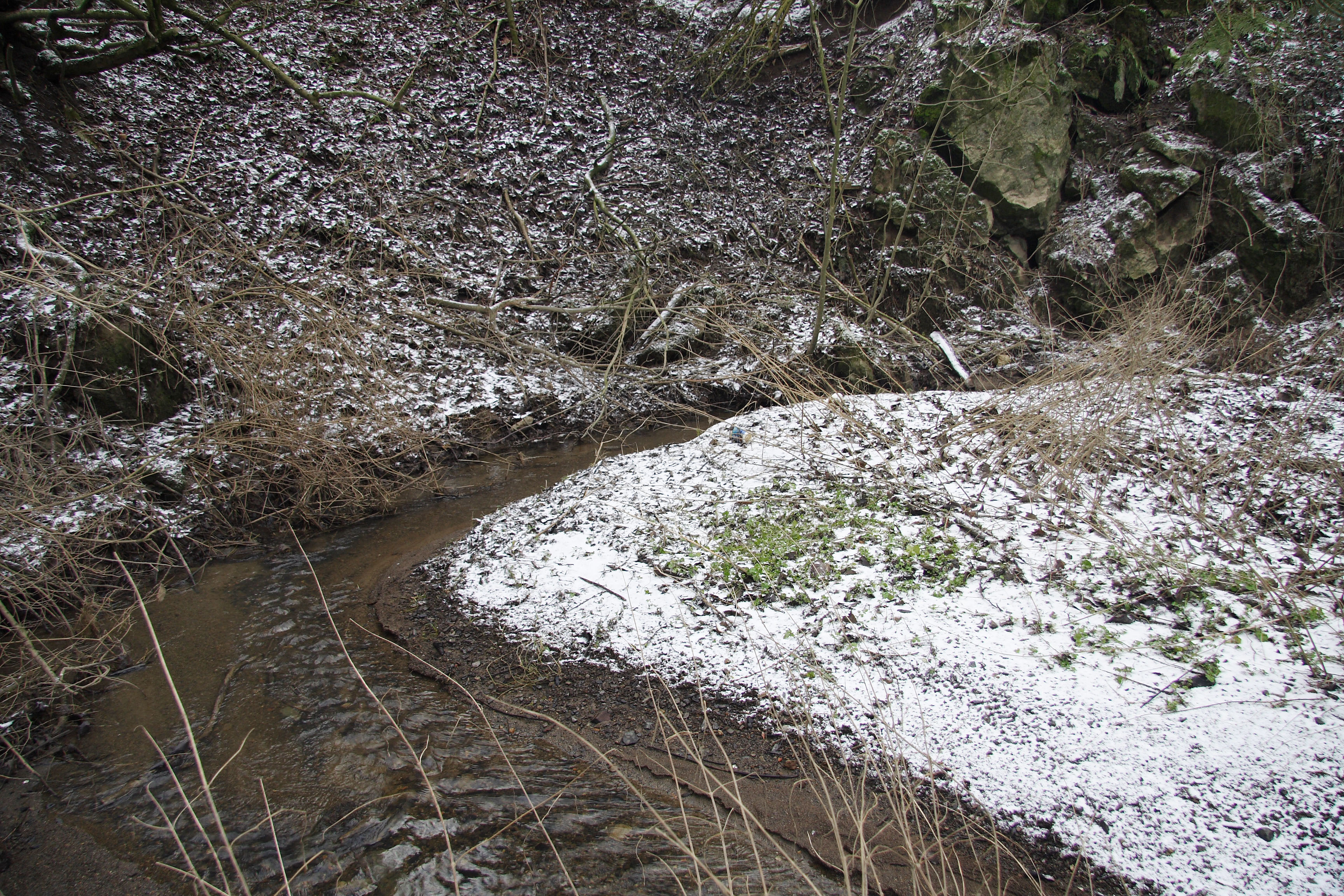
- Ponor of the Untreue in winter

Location
- Country: Germany
- State: North Rhine-Westphalia
- City: Brilon

Physical characteristics
- Source
  - elevation: 480 m (1,570 ft)
- Length: 2700 meters

Untreue is a brook in Brilon, North Rhine-Westphalia, Germany. It disappears after about 2,700 meters east of Brilon at ca. 440 m (1,440 ft) meters above NN through a ponor into limestone.

== See also ==
- List of rivers of North Rhine-Westphalia
