= Pivara =

Coordinates: 45°57′07″N 20°06′48″E

Pivara Пивара
- City municipality
- Interactive map of Pivara
- Country: Serbia
- Region: Šumadija and Western Serbia
- District: Šumadija
- Municipality: Kragujevac
- Founded: 31 May 2002
- Dissolved: 4 March 2008
- Settlements: 20

Area
  - Municipality: 258 km^{2} (100 sq mi)

Population (2002 census)
  - Urban: 25,847
  - Municipality: 49,154
- Time zone: UTC+1 (CET)
  - Summer (DST): UTC+2 (CEST)
- Postal code: 34070
- Area code: +381(0)34
- Car plates: KG

Pivara (Serbian Cyrillic: Пивара) was one of five city municipalities which constituted the City of Kragujevac. The municipality was formed in May 2002, only to be dissolved in March 2008.

== Inhabited places ==
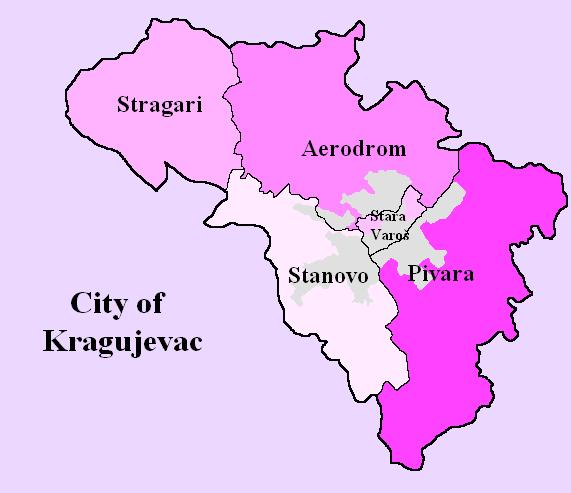
Map of the city municipalities which constituted the city of Kragujevac

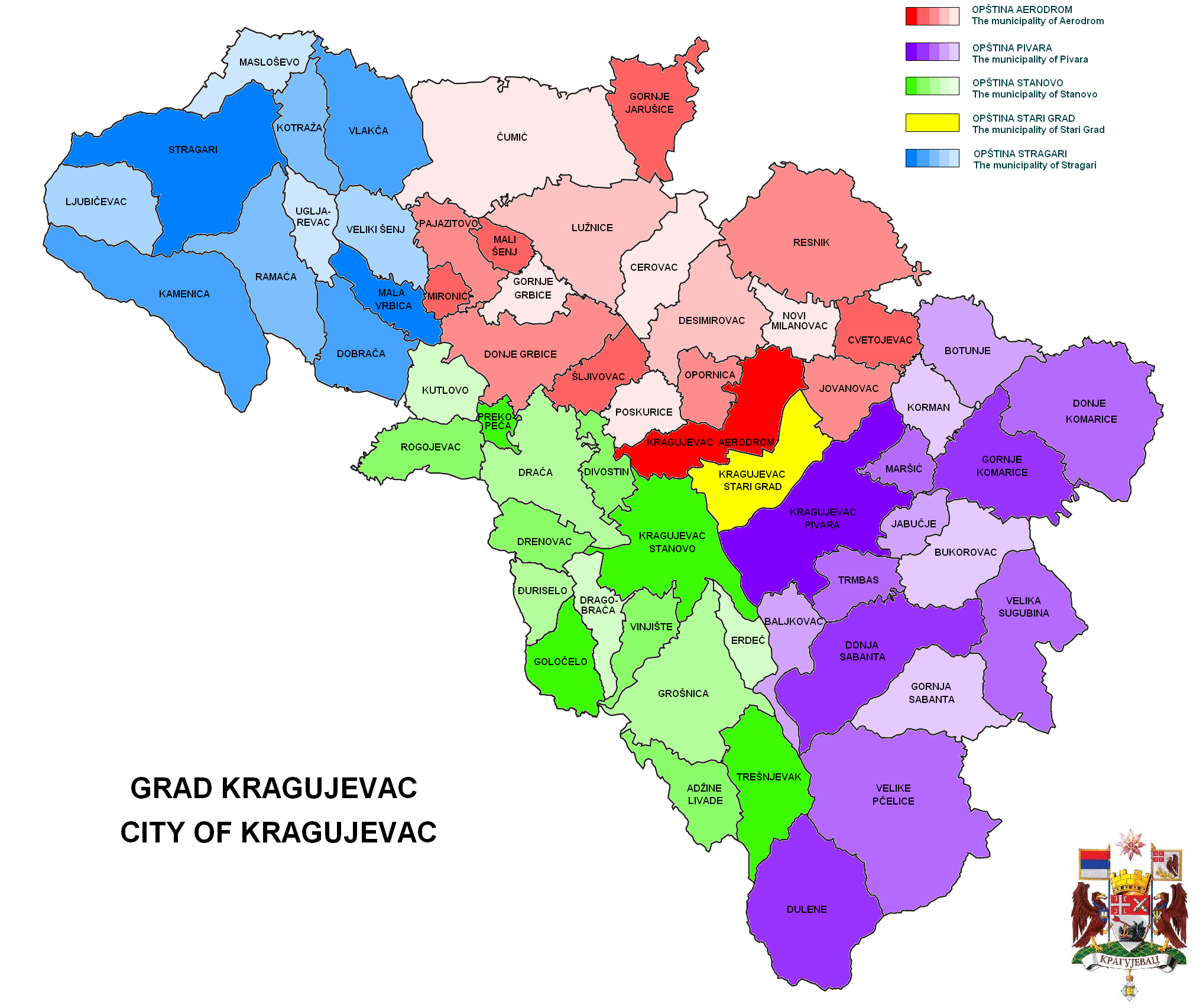
Map of the city municipalities with settlements

The Municipality of Pivara comprised the following settlements:

Settlement	Population	Area (ha)
Urban Kragujevac	42,388	2214
Baljkovac	621	847
Botunje	649	1314
Bukorovac	229	1433
Velika Sugubina	284	2034
Velike Pčelice	673	4073
Gornja Sabanta	839	1490
Gornje Komarice	322	1841
Donja Sabanta	651	2517
Donje Komarice	545	2782
Dulene	218	2567
Jabučje	154	523
Korman	692	774
Maršić	294	882
Trmbas	595	556
Total	49,154	25,847
