= Vladimir Cukavac =

Royal Yugoslav Army general (1884–1965)

General Vladimir G. Cukavac
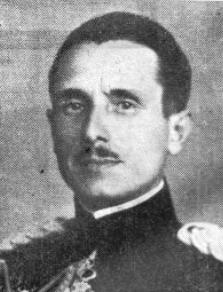
- Cukavac in 1932
- Born: 29 May 1884; Valjevo, Serbia
- Died: 7 April 1965 (aged 80); Belgrade, SFR Yugoslavia
- Military career
- Allegiance: Kingdom of Serbia; Kingdom of Yugoslavia
- Branch: Royal Serbian Army; Royal Yugoslav Army
- Service years: 1905–1941
- Rank: Army general
- Commands: 5th Army
- Conflicts: First Balkan War; Second Balkan War; World War I; Salonica front; World War II; 1941 Invasion of Yugoslavia (POW)

Vladimir Cukavac (Serbian Cyrillic: Владимир Цукавац; 29 May 1884 – 7 April 1965) was a Serbian general holding the title of army general in the Royal Yugoslav Army. He commanded the 5th Army during the German-led Axis invasion of Yugoslavia of April 1941 during World War II. He also served as the 23rd Dean of the Academic Board of the Yugoslav Military Academy and was its chief from 1936 to 1940.

== Career ==
Cukavac's command consisted of the Timok, Toplica, Drina, Morava and Kosovo Divisions, and Vlasnica and Kalna Detachments. The 5th Army was responsible for the Romanian and Bulgarian borders between the Iron Gates and the Greek border.

In 1934, he was awarded the Legion of Honour.
