= Baljkovac =

Baljkovac Баљковац (Serbian)
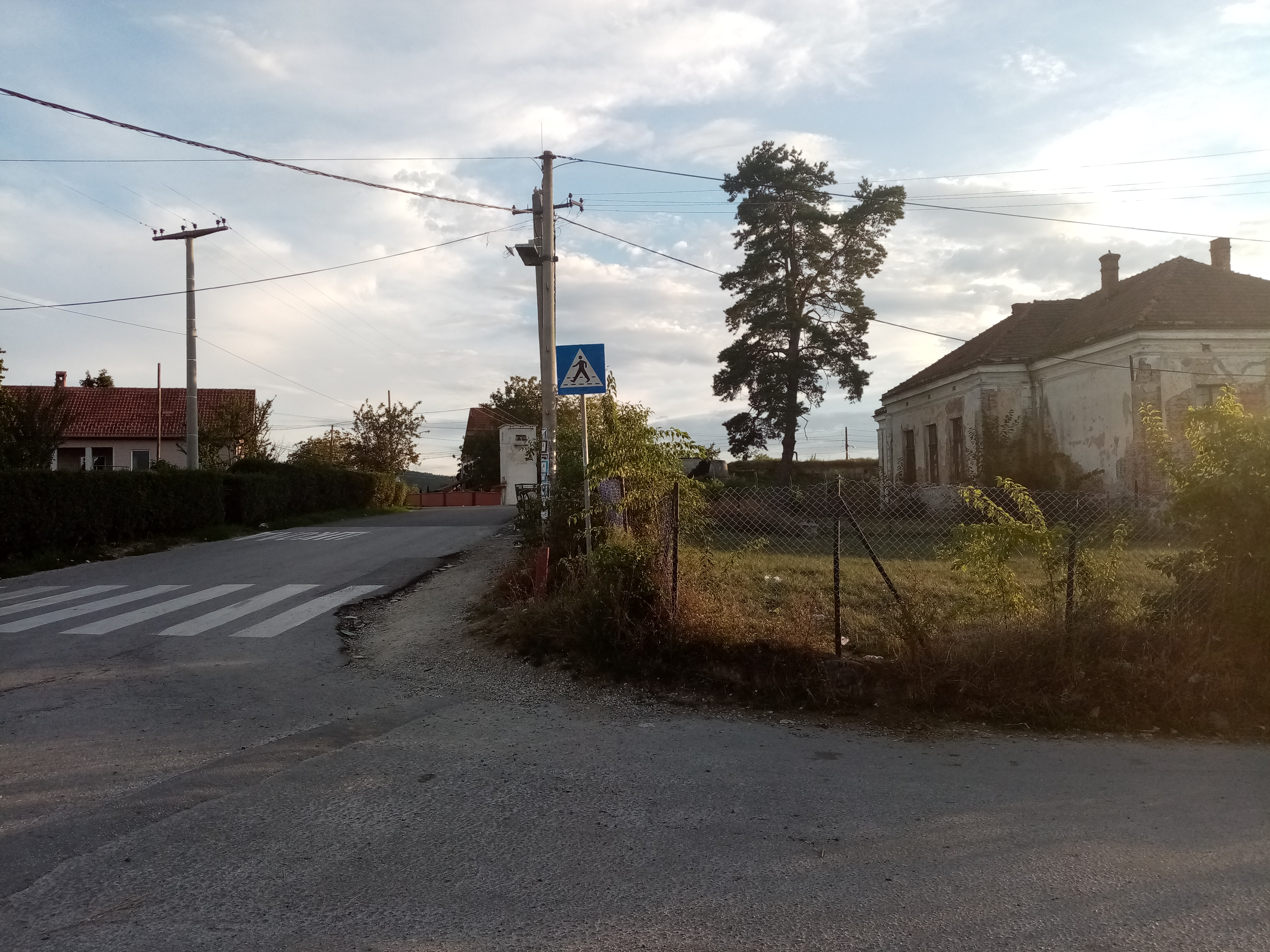
- Baljkovac, Šumadija District

- Location in Serbia
- Coordinates: 43°57′59″N 20°55′19″E
- Country: Serbia
- Region: Šumadija
- District: Šumadija District
- City district: Kragujevac
- Municipality: Pivara

Baljkovac (Serbian: Баљковац) is a village in the Pivara municipality of Kragujevac in the Šumadija District of central Serbia.
