= Dulene =

Dulene Дулене (Serbian)
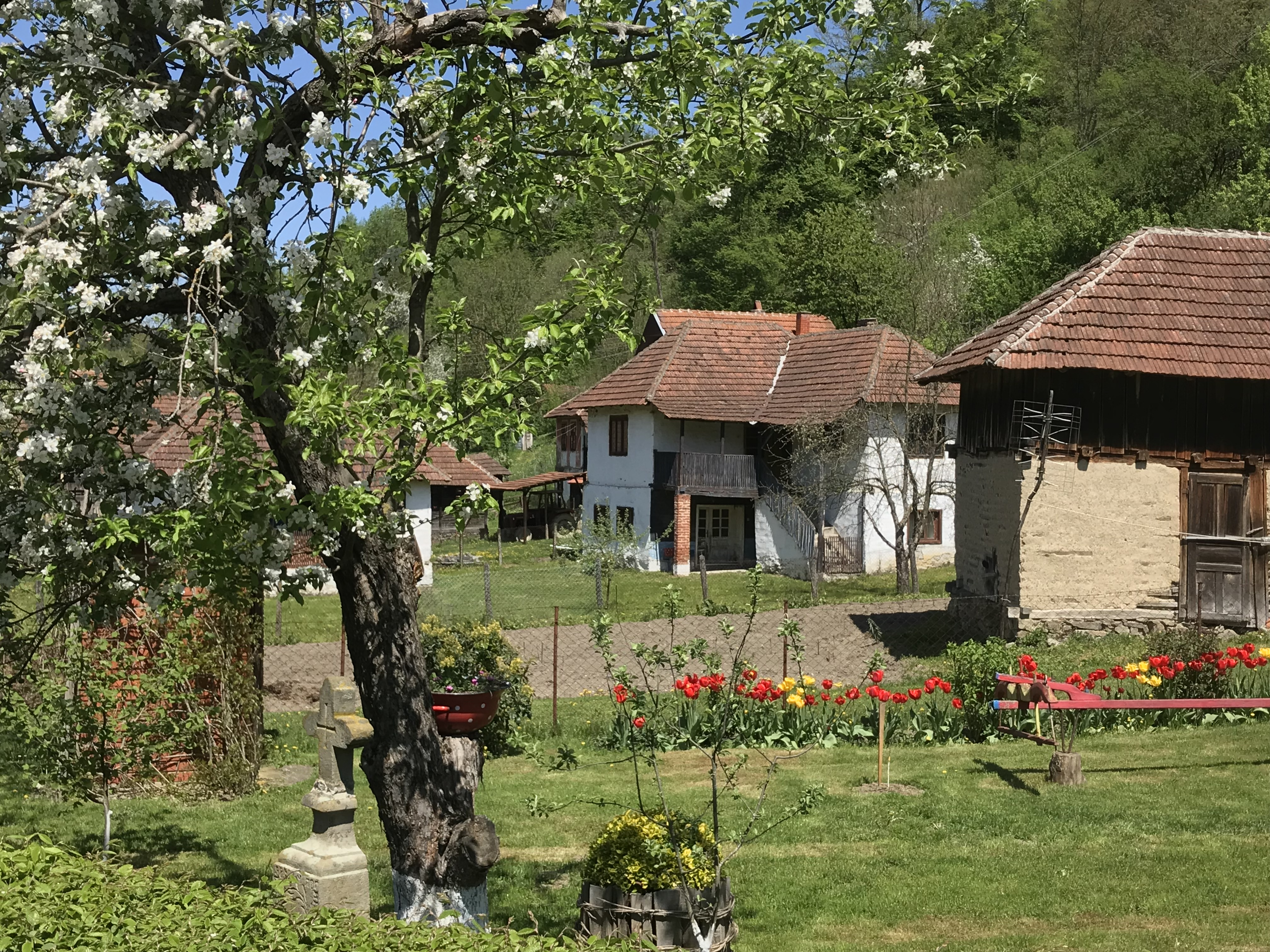
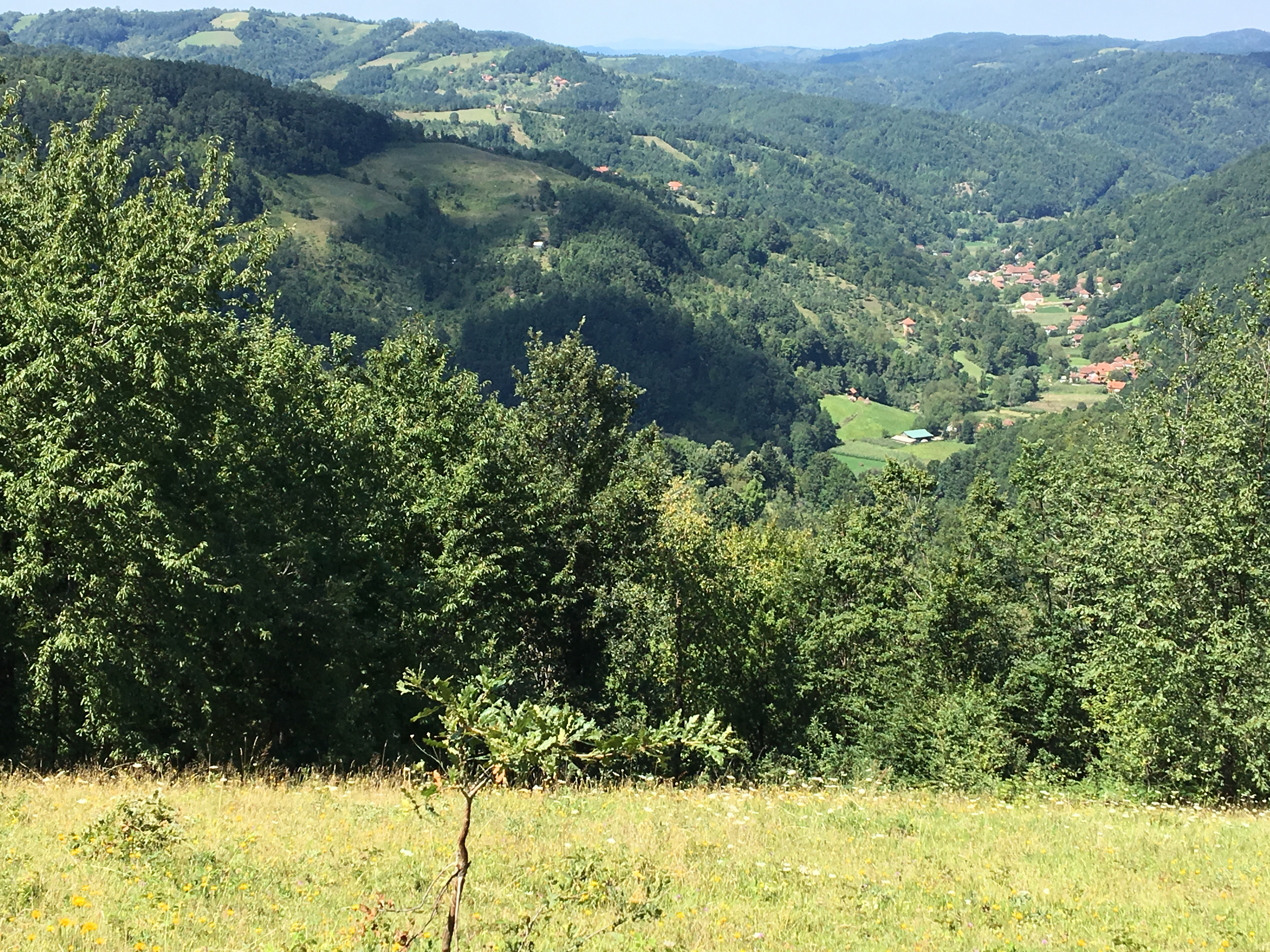
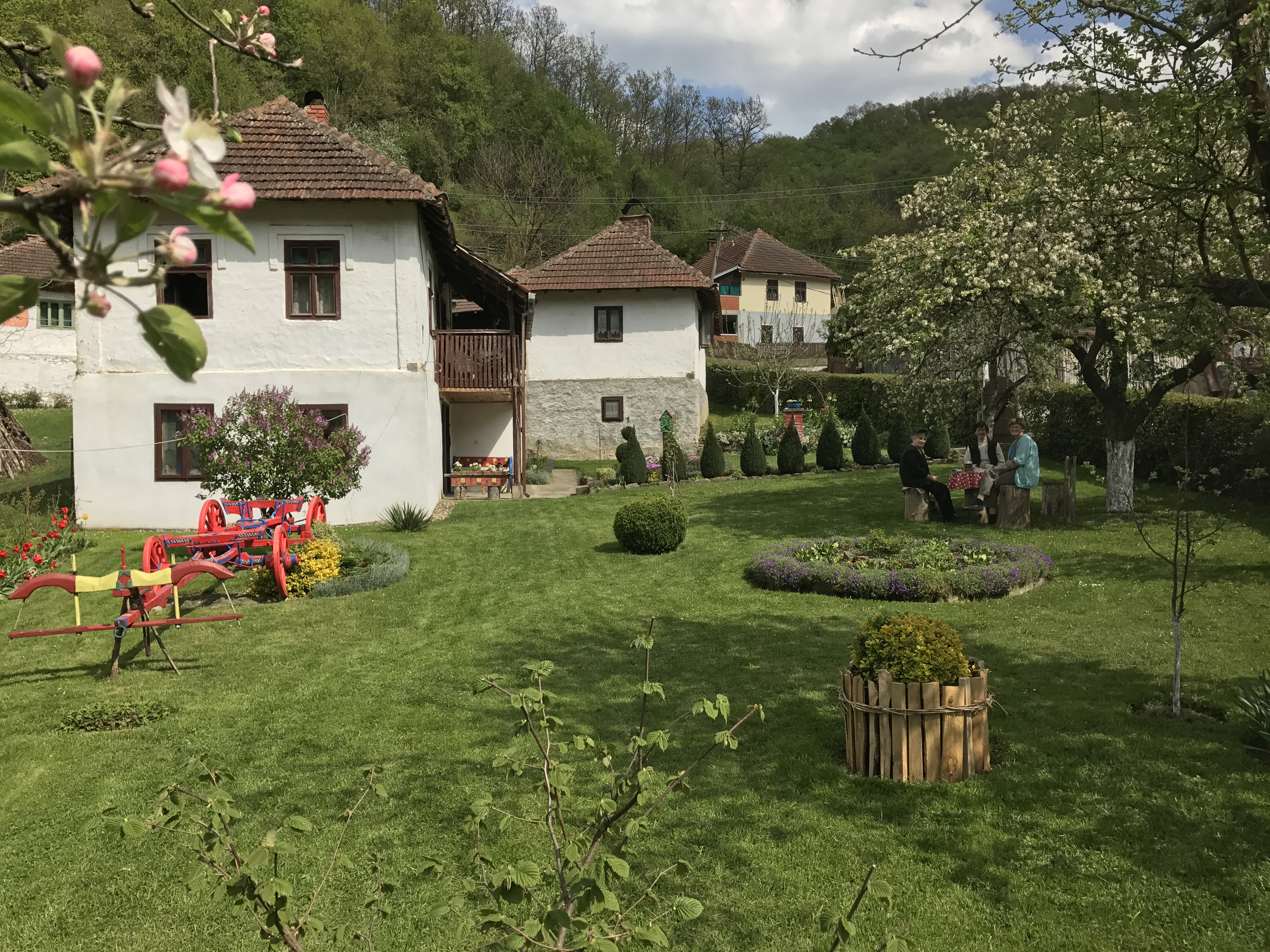
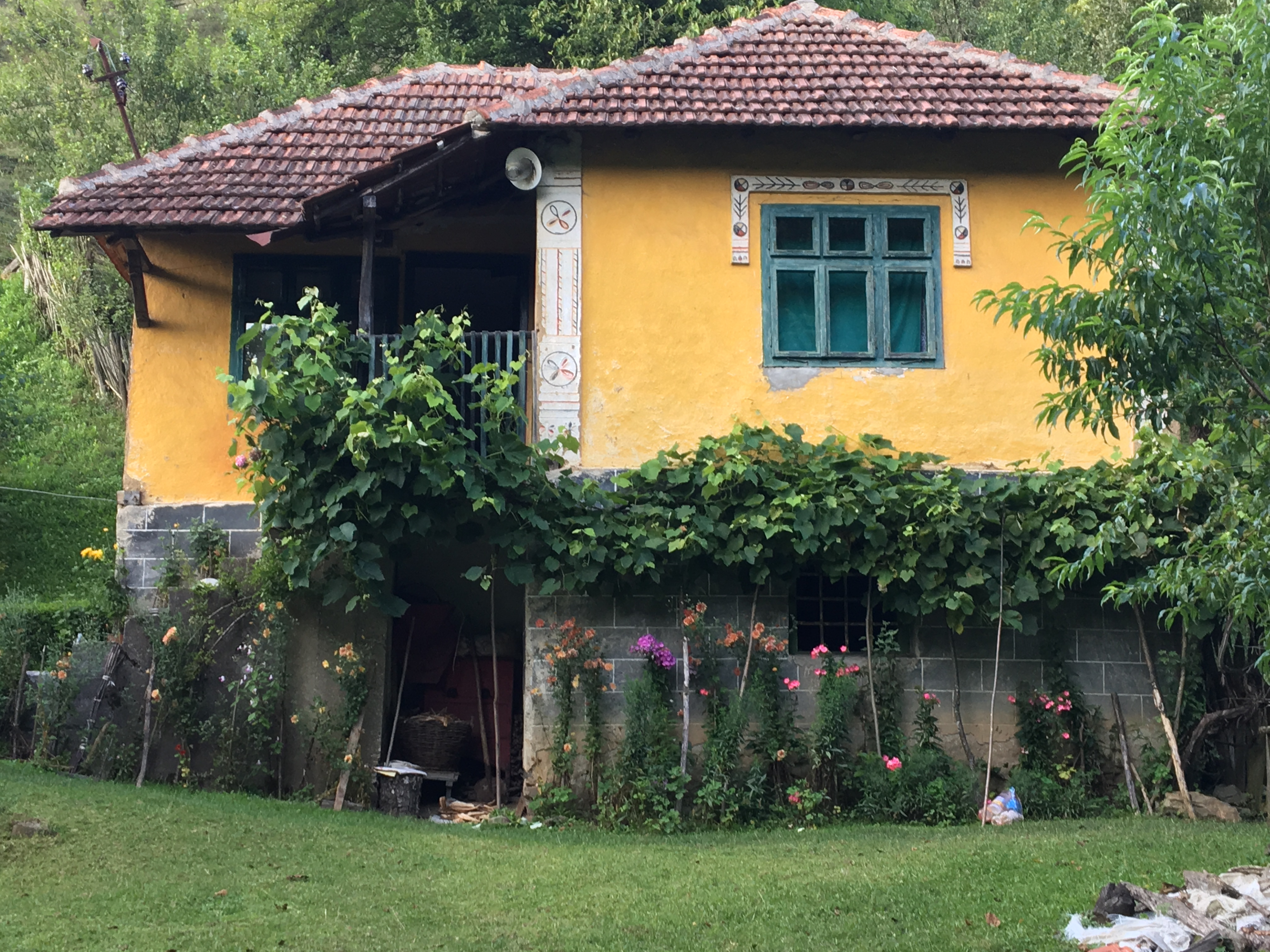

- Location in Serbia
- Coordinates: 43°52′17″N 20°56′56″E
- Country: Serbia
- Region: Šumadija
- District: Šumadija District
- City district: Kragujevac
- Municipality: Pivara

Population
  - Total: 68

Dulene (Serbian: Дулене) is a village in Pivara municipality in Kragujevac city district in the Šumadija District of central Serbia.

According to the 2022 census, the village has a population of 68 people. In 2011, it had 218 people.

== History ==
The first families settled in Dulene in the late 18th and early 19th centuries. After the Second Serbian Uprising, Dulene administratively belongs to Levač.
