= Korman, Kragujevac =

Korman Корман (Serbian)
- Location in Serbia
- Coordinates: 44°2′33″N 21°0′6″E
- Country: Serbia
- Region: Šumadija
- District: Šumadija District
- City district: Kragujevac
- Municipality: Pivara

Population
  - Total: 692

Korman (Serbian: Корман) is a village in Pivara municipality in Kragujevac city district in the Šumadija District of central Serbia. It is located east of the city. It has a population of 692.
