= Velika Sugubina =

Velika Sugubina Велика Сугубина (Serbian)
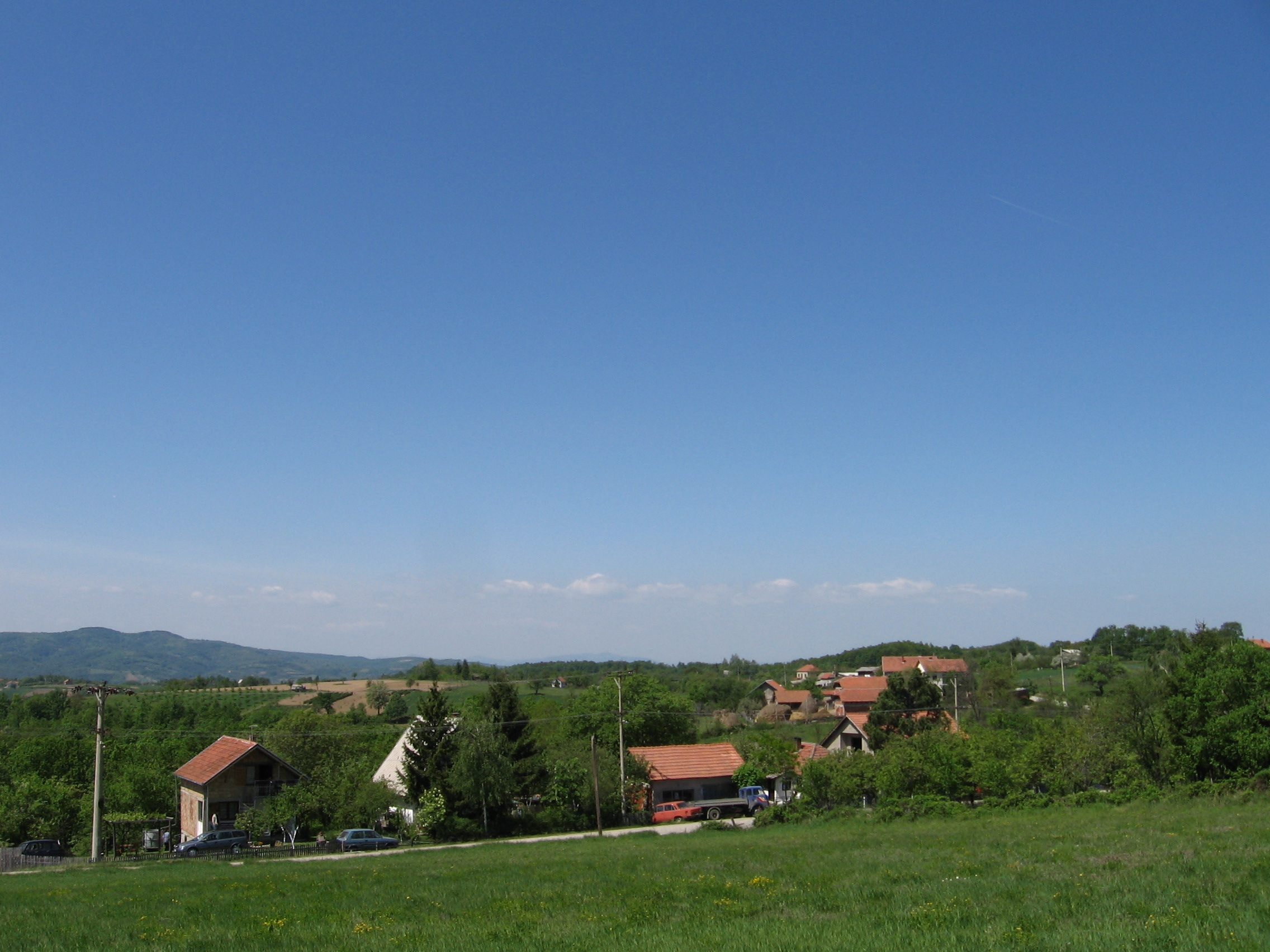

- Location in Serbia
- Coordinates: 43°56′59″N 21°2′30″E
- Country: Serbia
- Region: Šumadija
- District: Šumadija District
- City district: Kragujevac
- Municipality: Pivara

Area
  - Total: 7.85 sq mi (20.34 km^{2})

Population
  - Total: 234

Velika Sugubina (Serbian: Велика Сугубина) is a village in Pivara municipality in Kragujevac city district in the Šumadija District of central Serbia. It is located south-east of the city.

It has a population of 234.
