= Donje Komarice =

Donje Komarice Доње Комарице (Serbian)
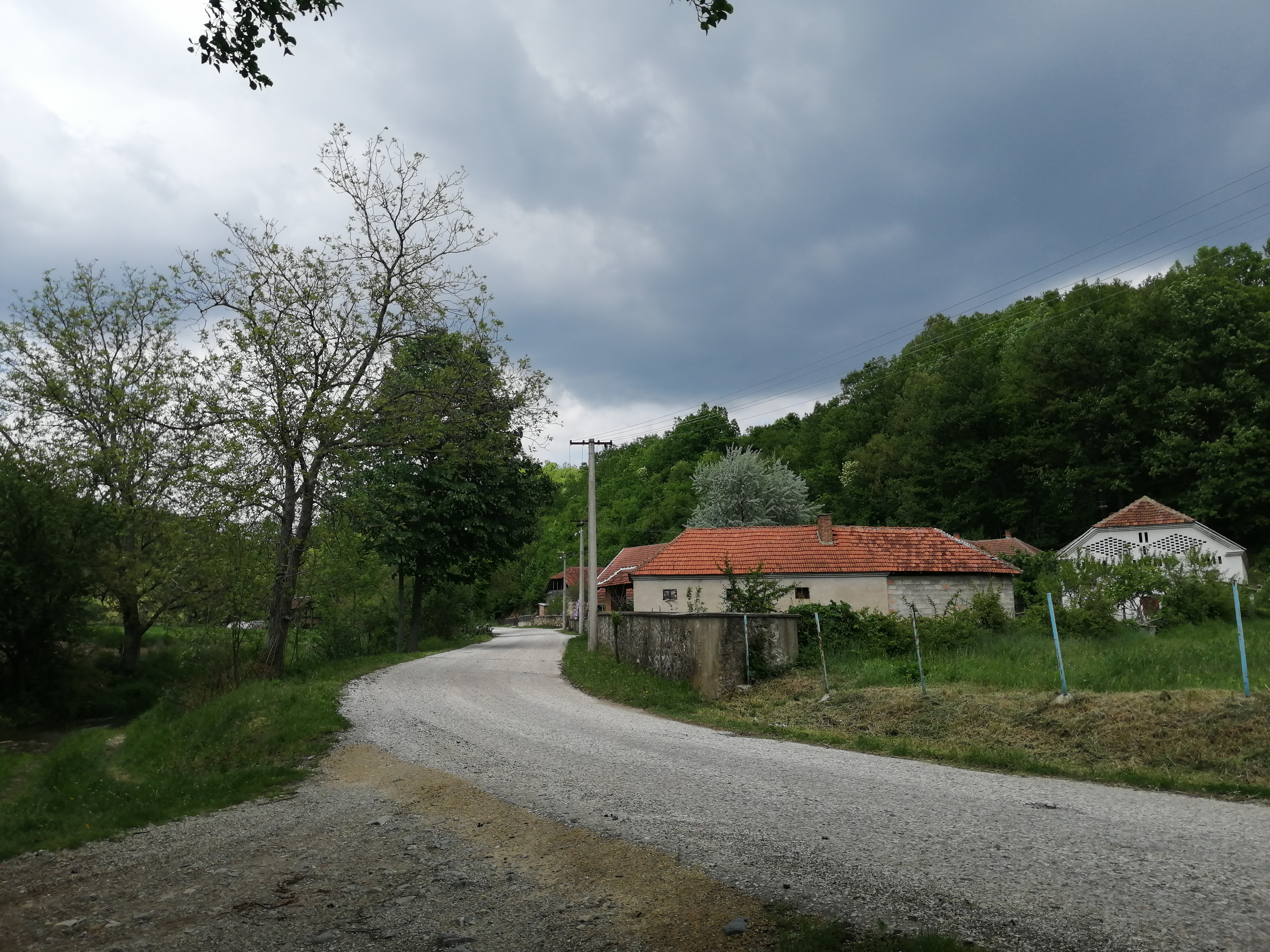

- Location in Serbia
- Coordinates: 44°3′1″N 21°3′56″E
- Country: Serbia
- Region: Šumadija
- District: Šumadija District
- City district: Kragujevac
- Municipality: Pivara

Population
  - Total: 545

Donje Komarice (Serbian: Доње Комарице) is a village in Pivara municipality in Kragujevac city district in the Šumadija District of central Serbia.

It has a population of 545.
