= Velike Pčelice =

Velike Pčelice Велике Пчелице (Serbian)
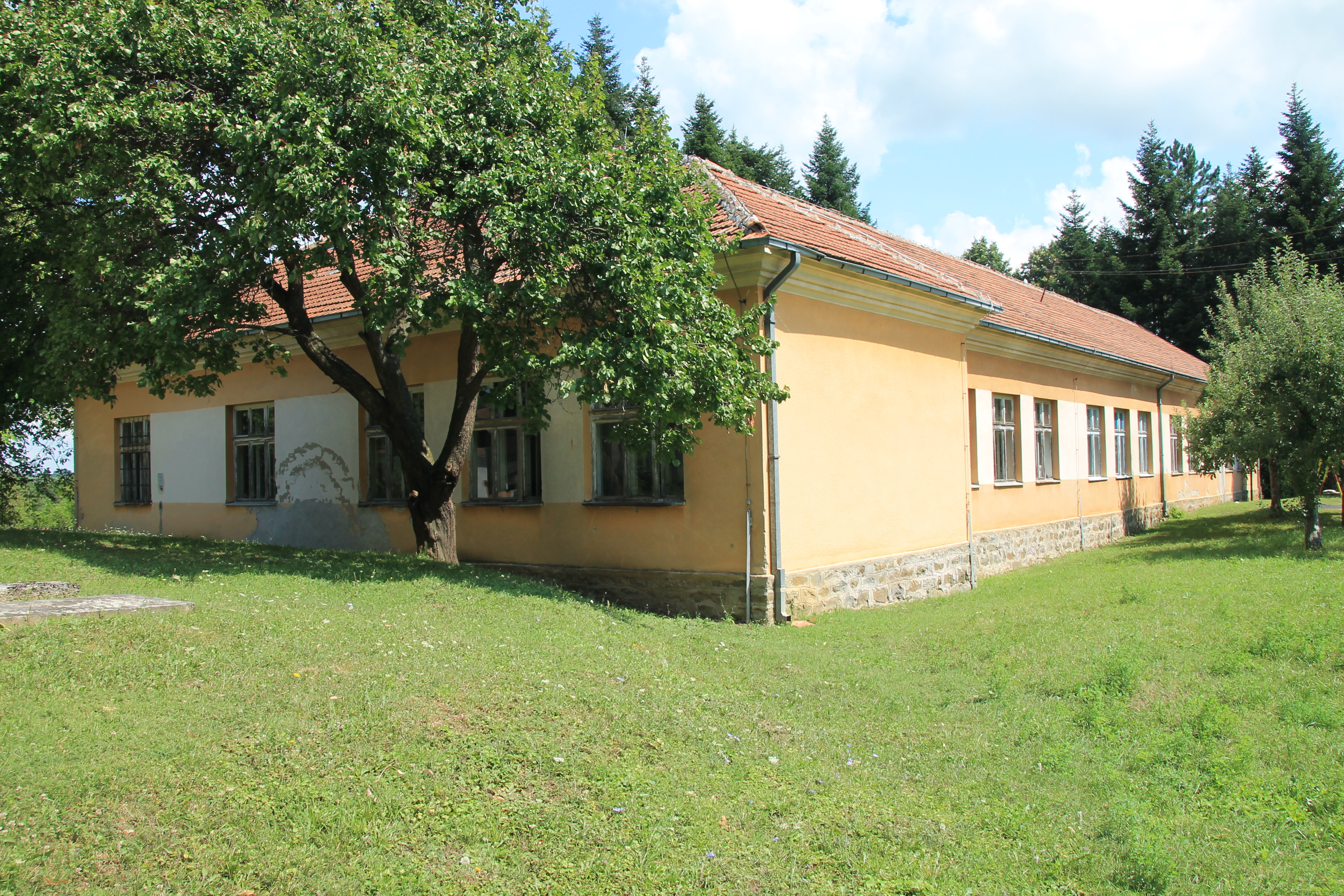
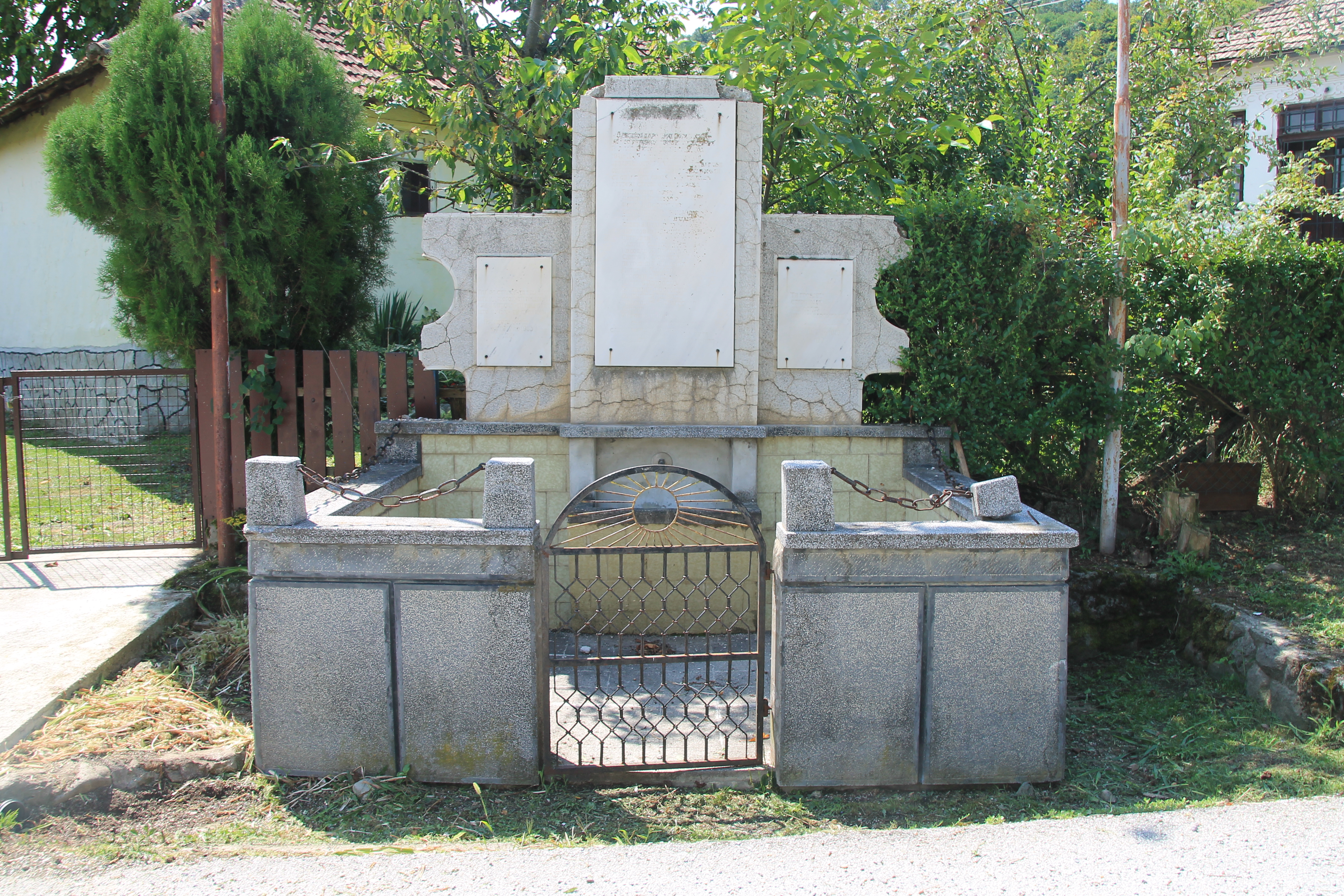
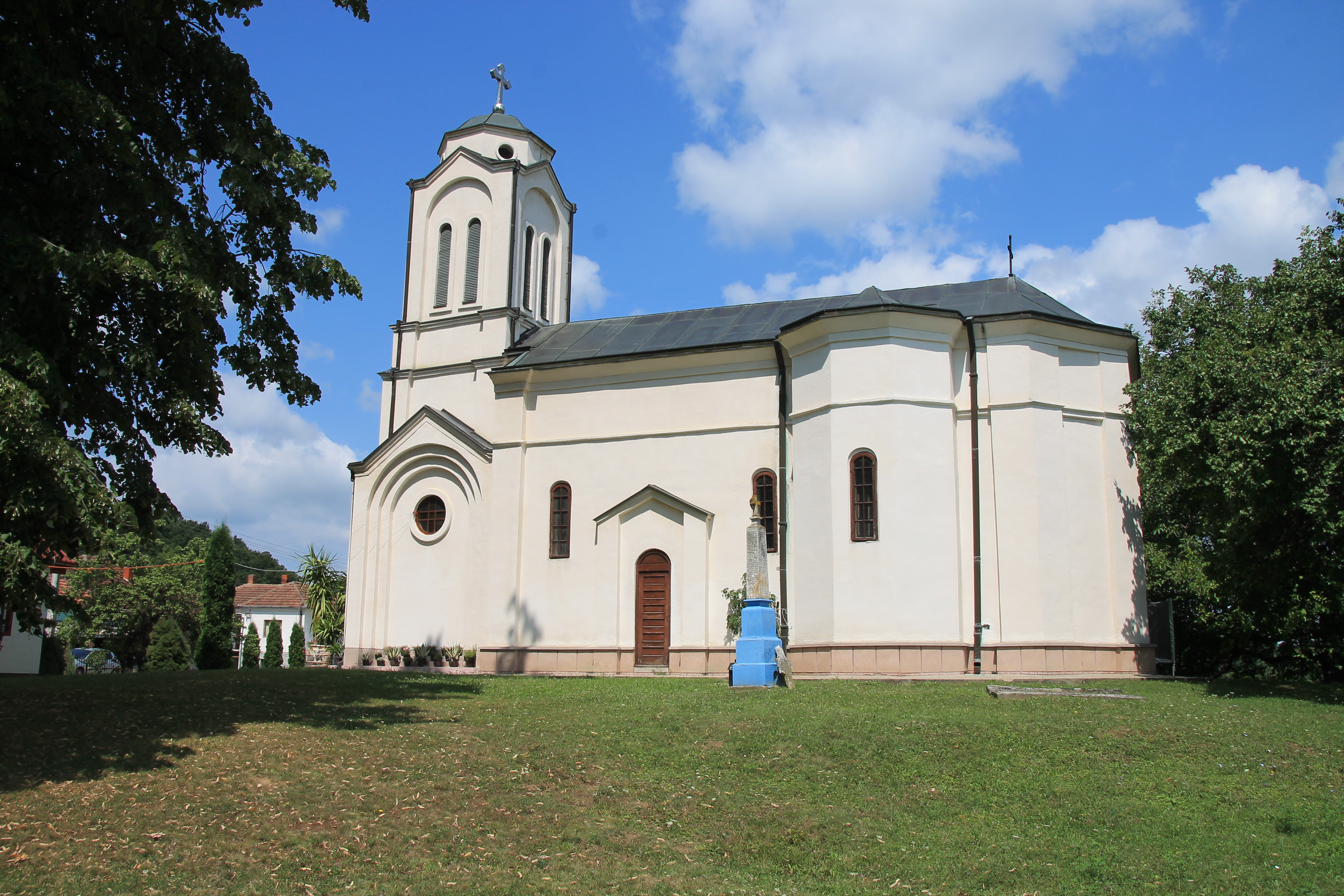
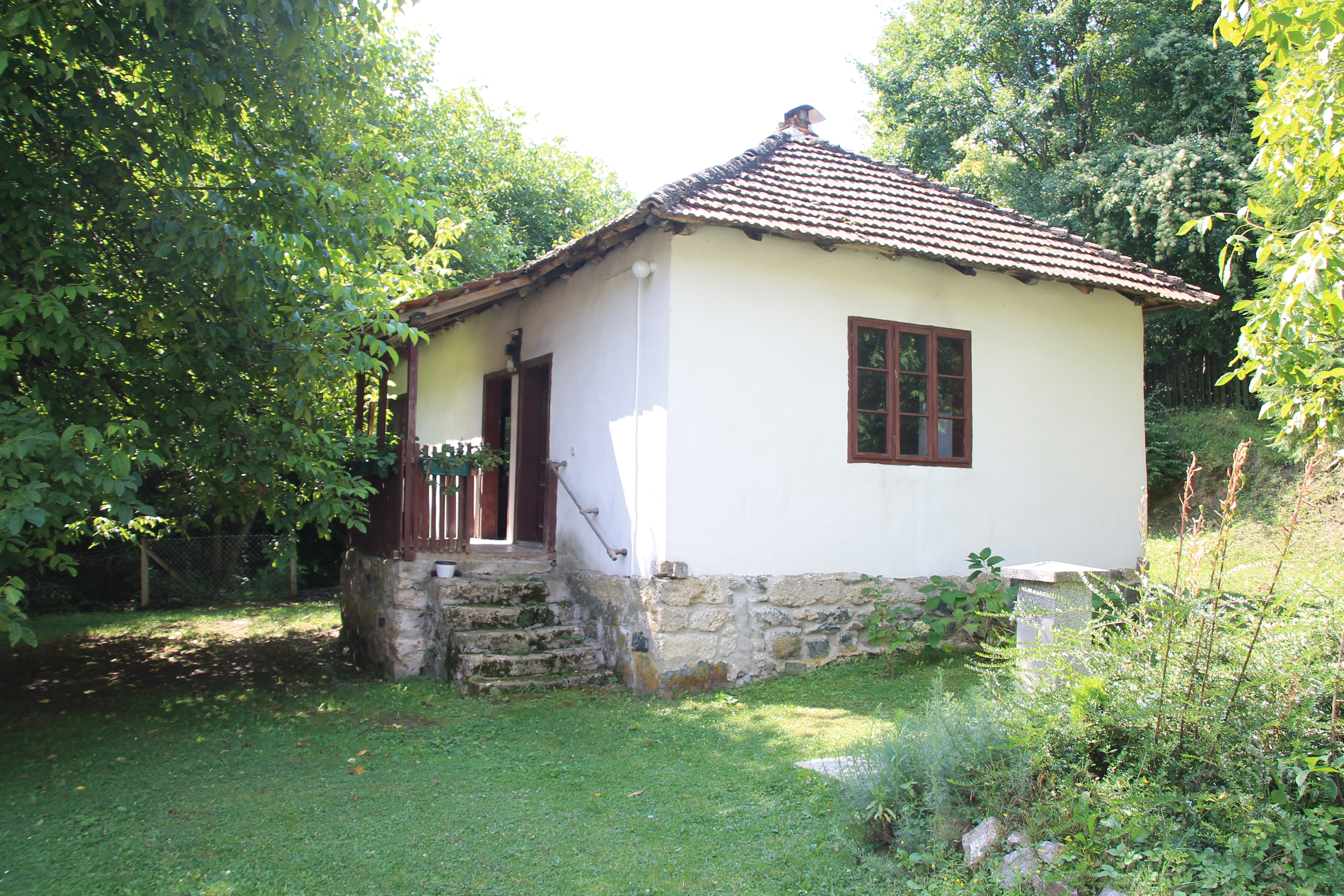
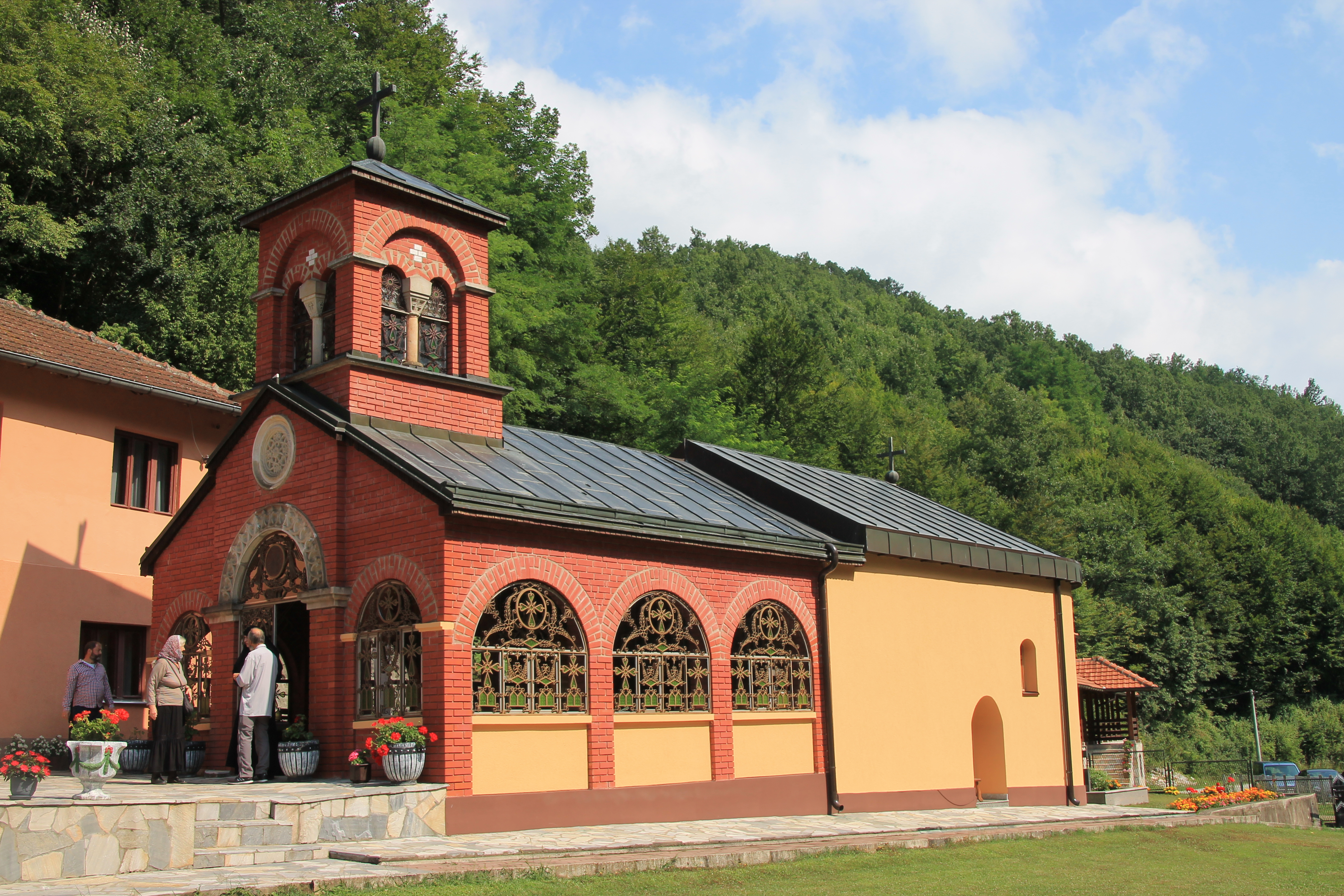
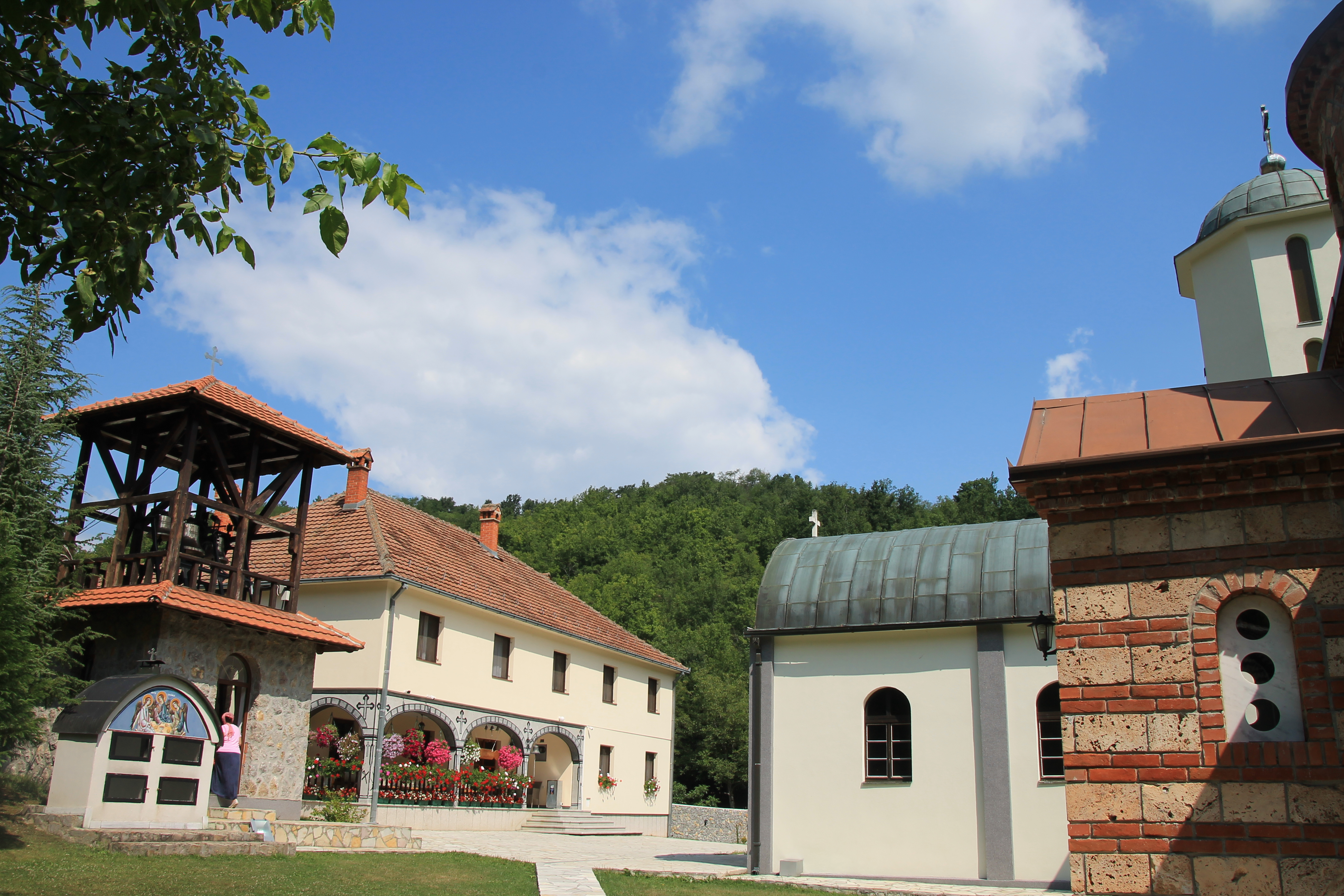

- Location in Serbia
- Coordinates: 43°54′15″N 20°58′27″E
- Country: Serbia
- Region: Šumadija
- District: Šumadija District
- City district: Kragujevac
- Municipality: Pivara

Population
  - Total: 673

Velike Pčelice (Serbian: Велике Пчелице) is a village in Pivara municipality in Kragujevac city district in the Šumadija District of central Serbia. It is located south of the city.

It has a population of 673.
