= Bukorovac =

Bukorovac Букоровац (Serbian)
- Village
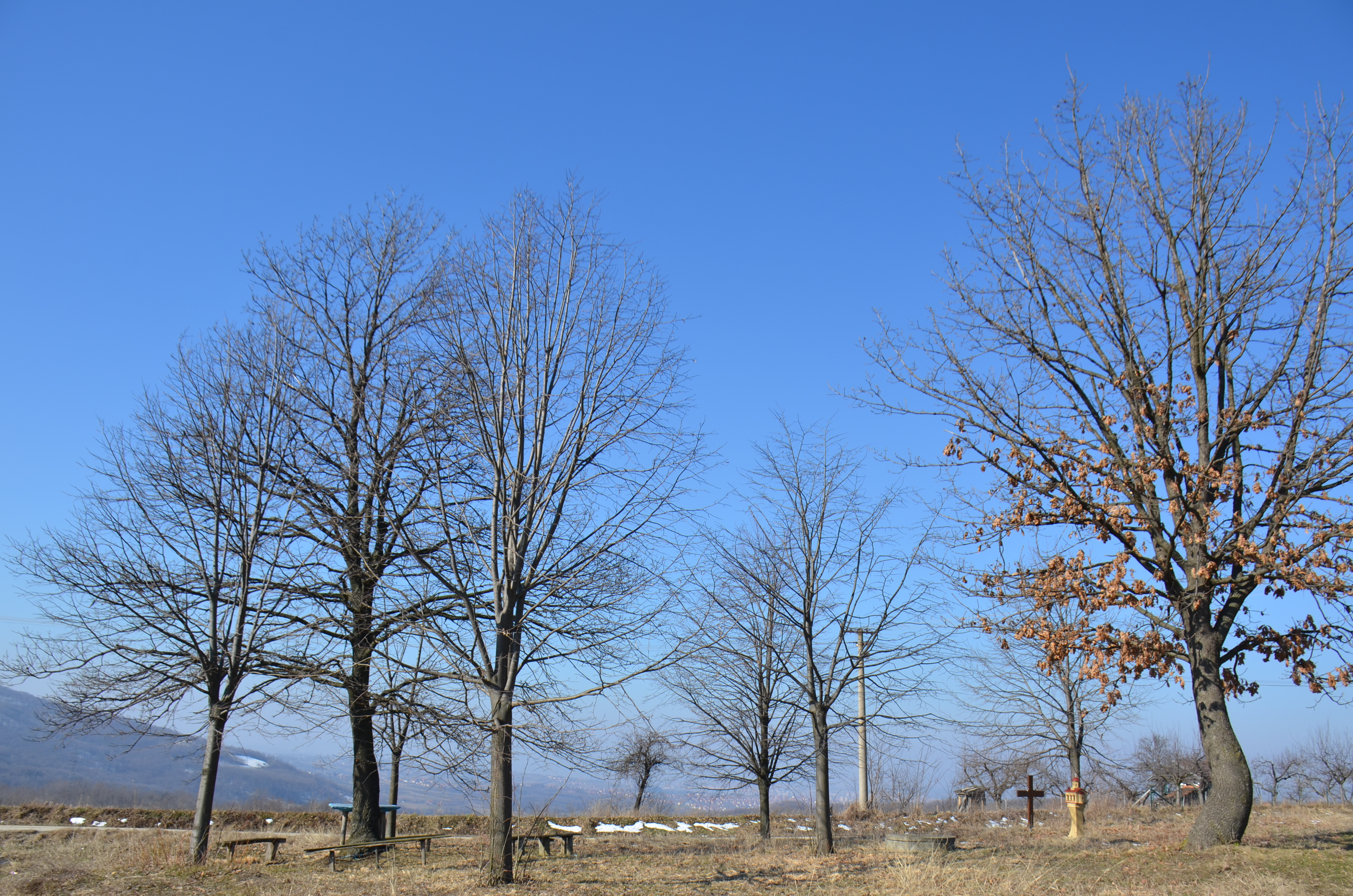

- Location in Serbia
- Coordinates: 44°0′23″N 21°0′53″E
- Country: Serbia
- Region: Šumadija
- District: Šumadija District
- City district: Kragujevac
- Municipality: Pivara
- Elevation: 833 ft (254 m)

Population (2002)
  - Total: 235
  - Ethnicities: Serbs
  - Religions: Serbian Orthodoxy

Bukorovac (Serbian Cyrillic: Букоровац) is a village in Pivara municipality in Kragujevac city district in the Šumadija District of central Serbia. It is located east of the city.
