= Gornje Komarice =

Gornje Komarice Горње Комарице (Serbian)
- Location in Serbia
- Coordinates: 44°1′47″N 21°2′7″E
- Country: Serbia
- Region: Šumadija
- District: Šumadija District
- City district: Kragujevac
- Municipality: Pivara

Population
  - Total: 322

Gornje Komarice (Serbian: Горње Комарице) is a village in Pivara municipality in Kragujevac city district in the Šumadija District of central Serbia.

It has a population of 322.
