= Gornja Sabanta =

Gornja Sabanta Горња Сабанта (Serbian)
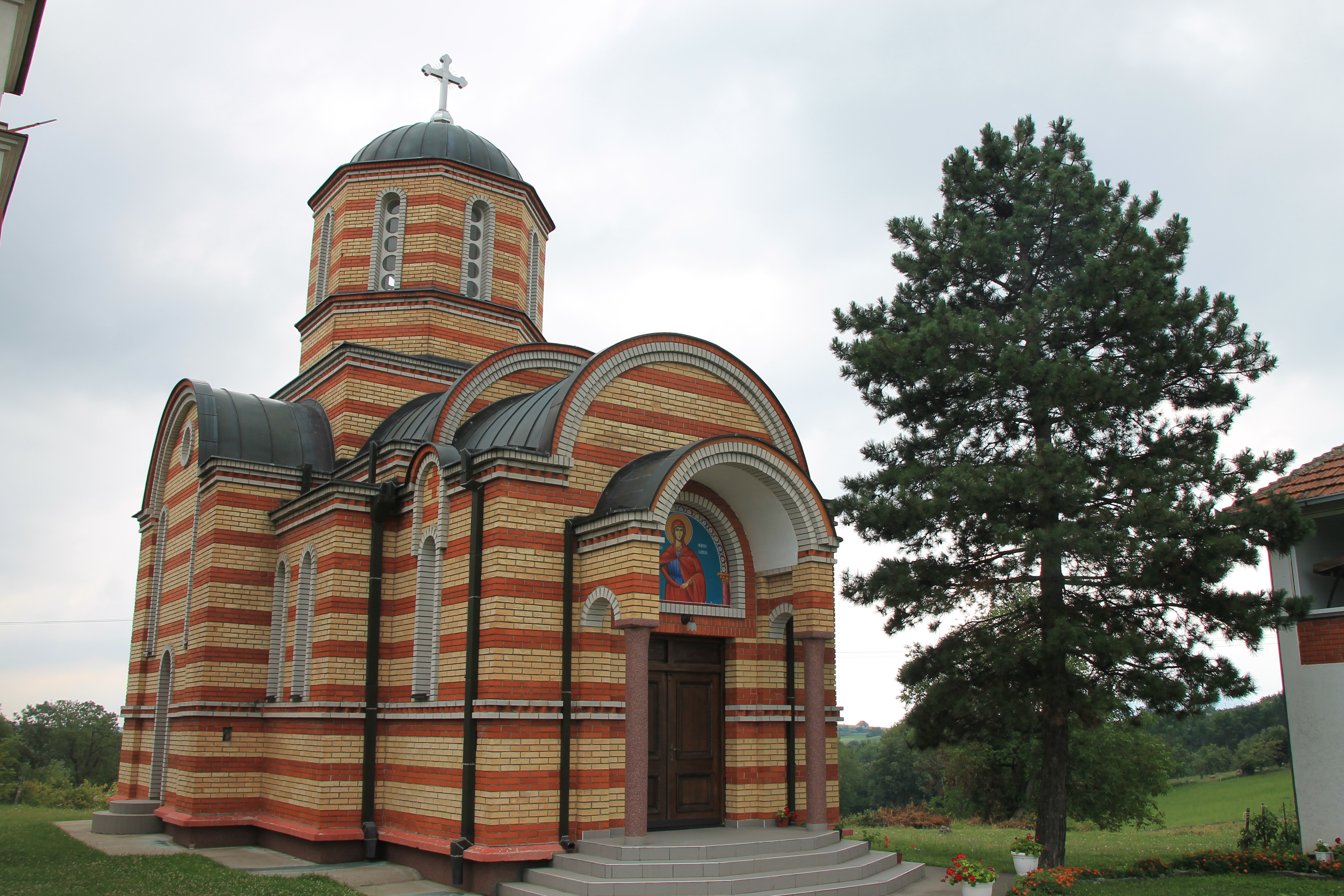

- Location in Serbia
- Coordinates: 43°56′30″N 21°0′17″E
- Country: Serbia
- Region: Šumadija
- District: Šumadija District
- City district: Kragujevac
- Municipality: Pivara

Population
  - Total: 839

Gornja Sabanta (Serbian: Горња Сабанта) is a village in the Pivara municipality in Kragujevac city district in the Šumadija District of central Serbia.

It has a population of 839 people.
