= Kaonik, Kruševac =

Kaonik Каоник
- Village
- Location within Serbia
- Coordinates: 43°33′33″N 21°29′49″E
- Country: Serbia
- Region: Šumadija and Western Serbia
- District: Rasina
- Municipality: Kruševac
- Elevation: 659 ft (201 m)

Population (2011)
  - Total: 1,282
- Time zone: UTC+1 (CET)
  - Summer (DST): UTC+2 (CEST)

Kaonik is a village in the municipality of Kruševac, Serbia. According to the 2011 census, the village has a population of 1282 inhabitants.

== Population ==
Population of Kaonik
1948	1953	1961	1971	1981	1991	2002	2011
2011	2073	2031	1944	1842	1652	1460	1282
