= Ponor =

Natural opening where surface water enters caves

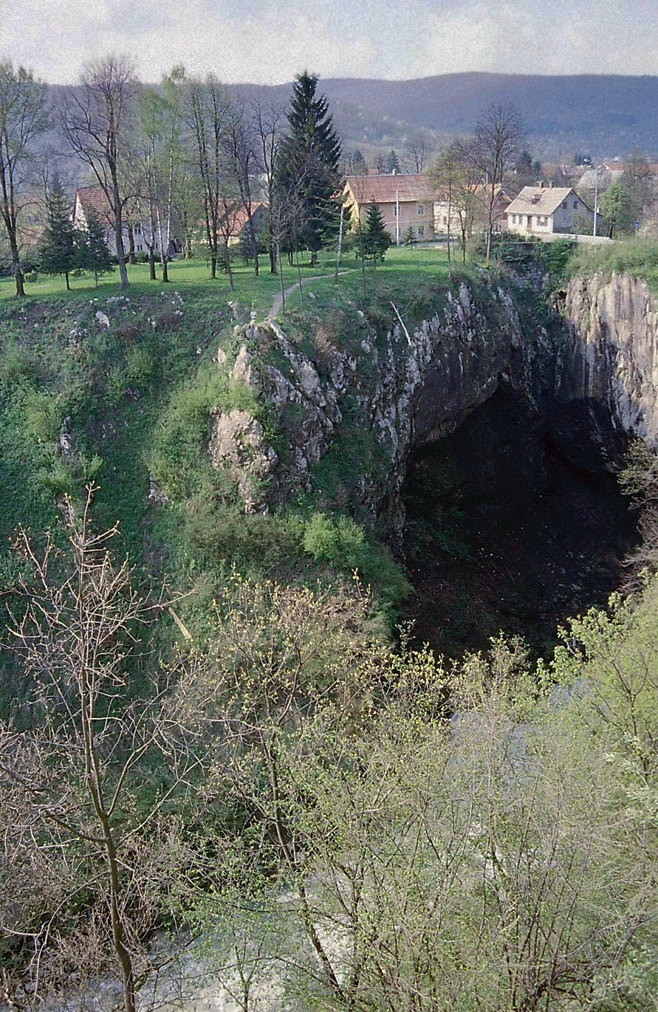
The river Dobra enters a 17 km long cave system at Đulin ponor in Ogulin, Croatia.

A ponor is a natural opening where surface water enters into underground passages; they may be found in karst landscapes where the geology and the geomorphology is typically dominated by porous limestone rock. Ponors can drain stream or lake water continuously or can at times work as springs, similar to estavelles. Morphologically, ponors come in forms of large pits and caves, large fissures and caverns, networks of smaller cracks, and sedimentary, alluvial drains.

== Etymology ==
The name for the karst formation ponor comes from Serbo-Croatian and Slovene. It derives from the proto-Slavic word *nora, meaning pit, hole.

Several places in southeast Europe (Bulgaria, Bosnia and Herzegovina, Croatia, Czech Republic, Hungary, Romania, Montenegro, Serbia, and Slovenia) bear the name Ponor due to associated karst openings.

== Description ==
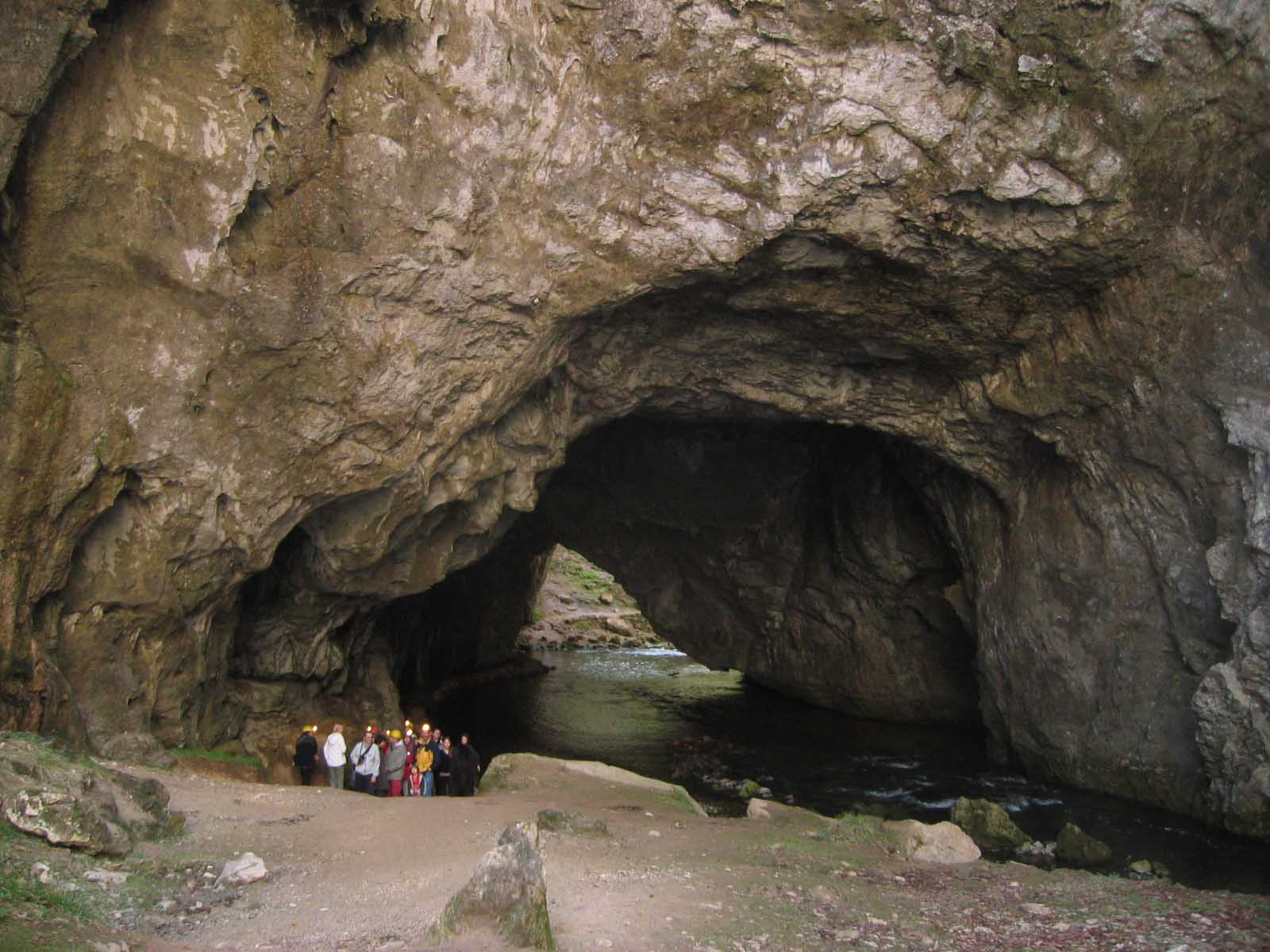
One of few ponors of the Rak River, Slovenia

Whereas a sinkhole (doline) is a depression of surface topography with a pit or cavity directly underneath, a ponor is kind of a portal where a surface stream or lake flows either partially or completely underground into a karst groundwater system.

Steady water erosion may have formed or enlarged the portal in (mainly limestone) rock, in a conglomerate, or in looser materials. Karst terrains are known for surface water losses through small ponors and its resurgence after having traveled through vast underground systems.

== Prevalence ==
Ponors are found worldwide, but only in karst regions. The entire Adriatic watershed within Bosnia and Herzegovina sits on Dinaric karst, with numerous explored and probably many more unexplored ponors and underground flows. There are significant geological ponors in the Carpathian Mountains, the Dinaric Alps, Greece, Turkey, and parts of the southern United States.

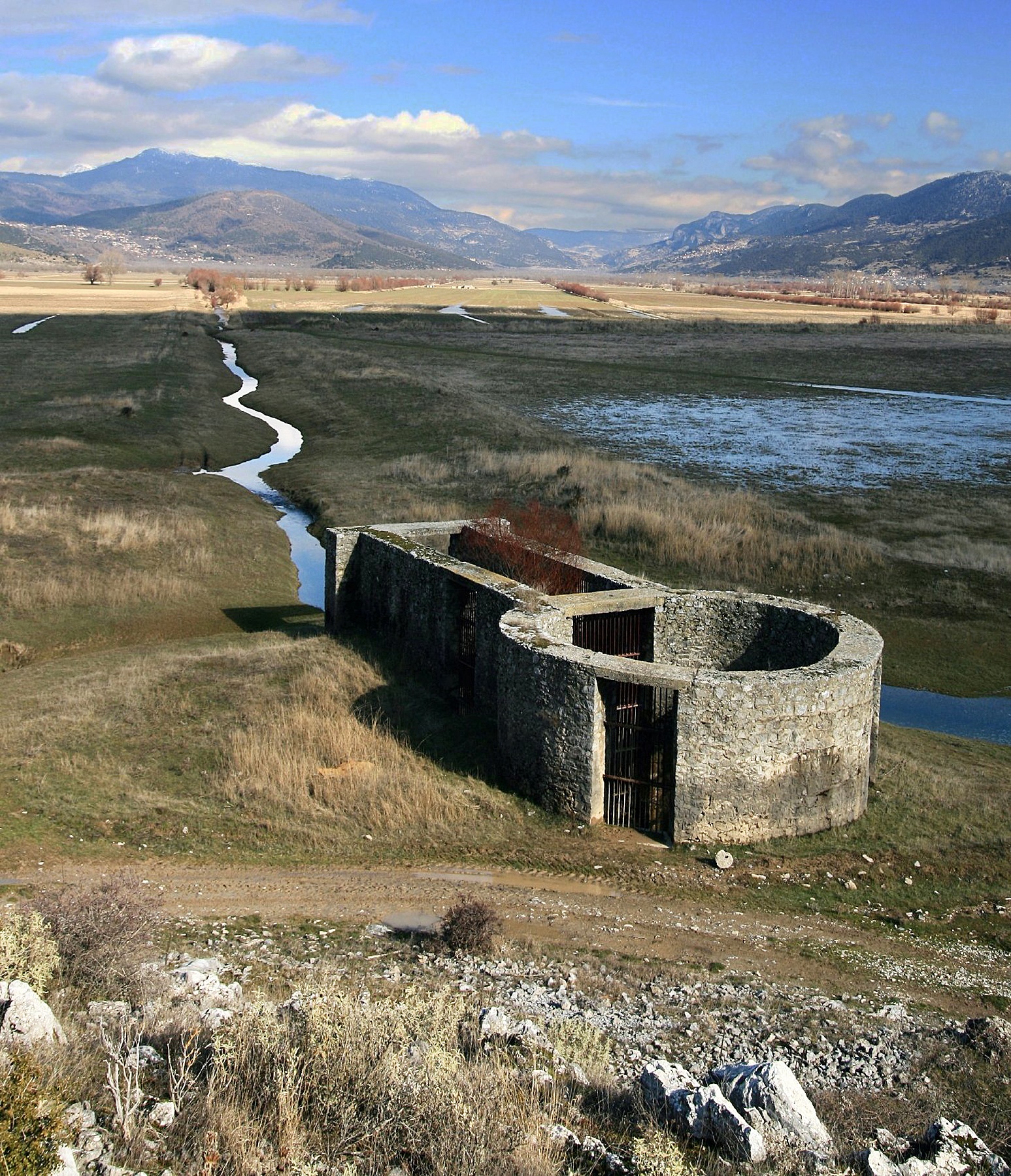
Polje of Feneos, Greece, lake until late 19. Century. Rain showers flood large parts even today

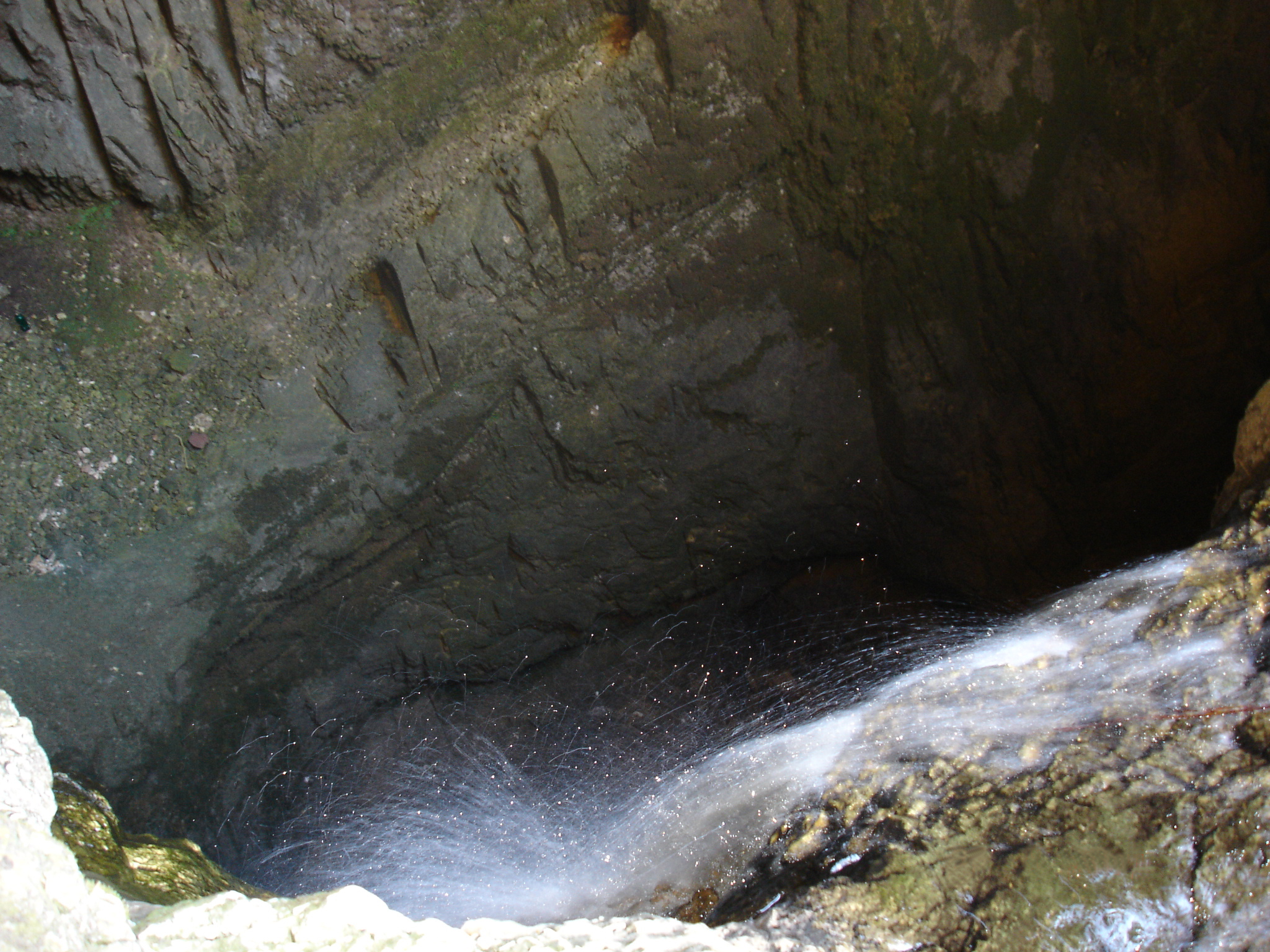
Closeup of ponor in Câmpeneasca cave near Izbuc village, Romania

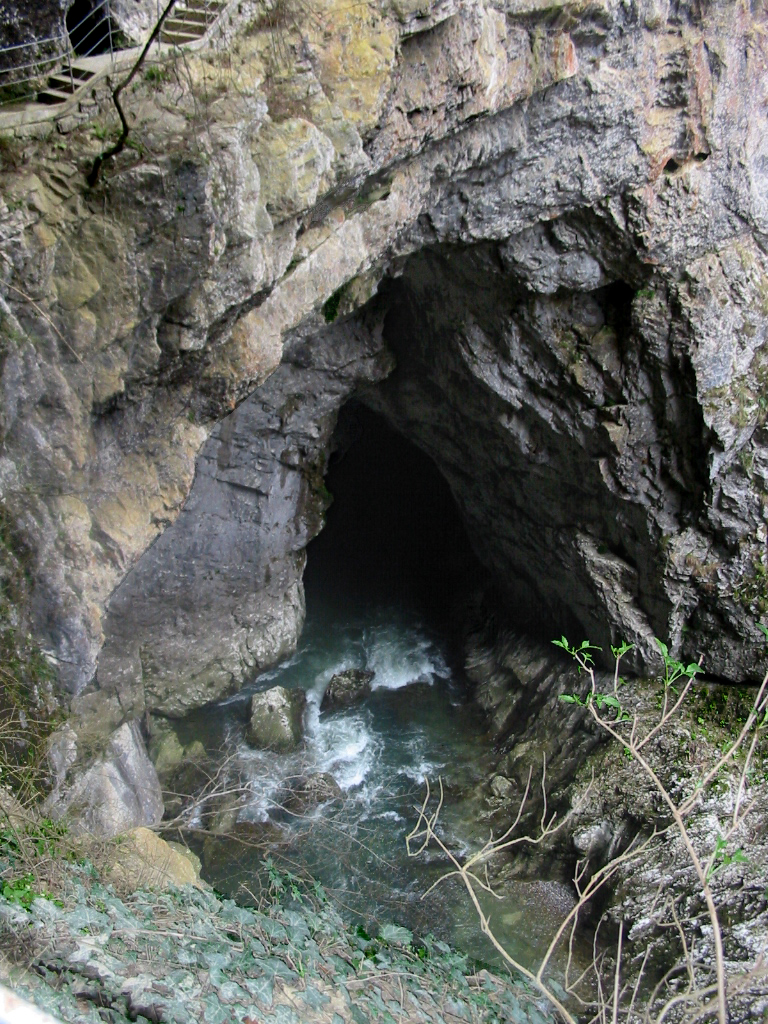
A ponor where the Reka River disappears into Škocjan Caves, Slovenia

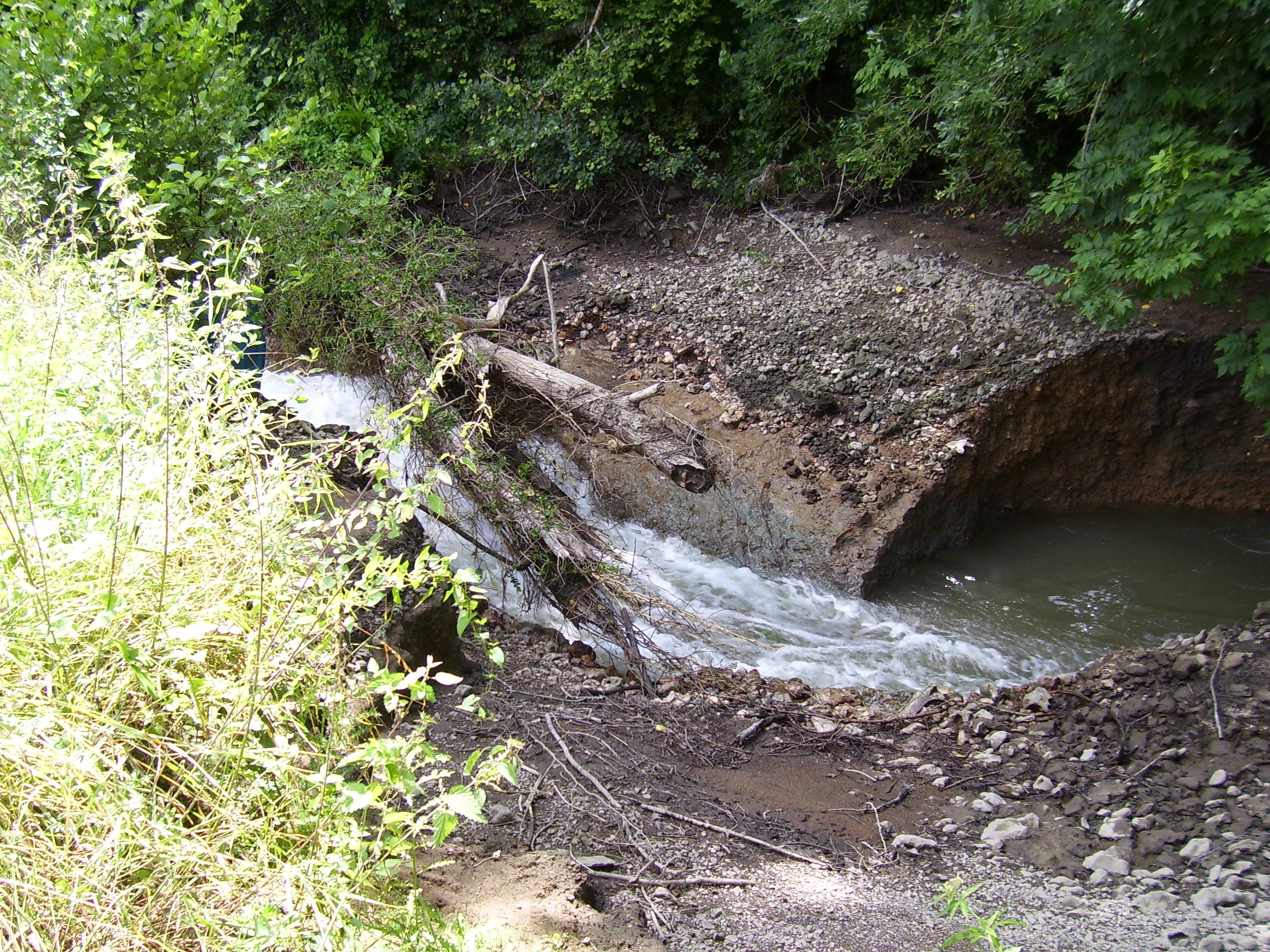
The Risle River disappears into a ponor between Ajou and La Houssaye (Eure, France)

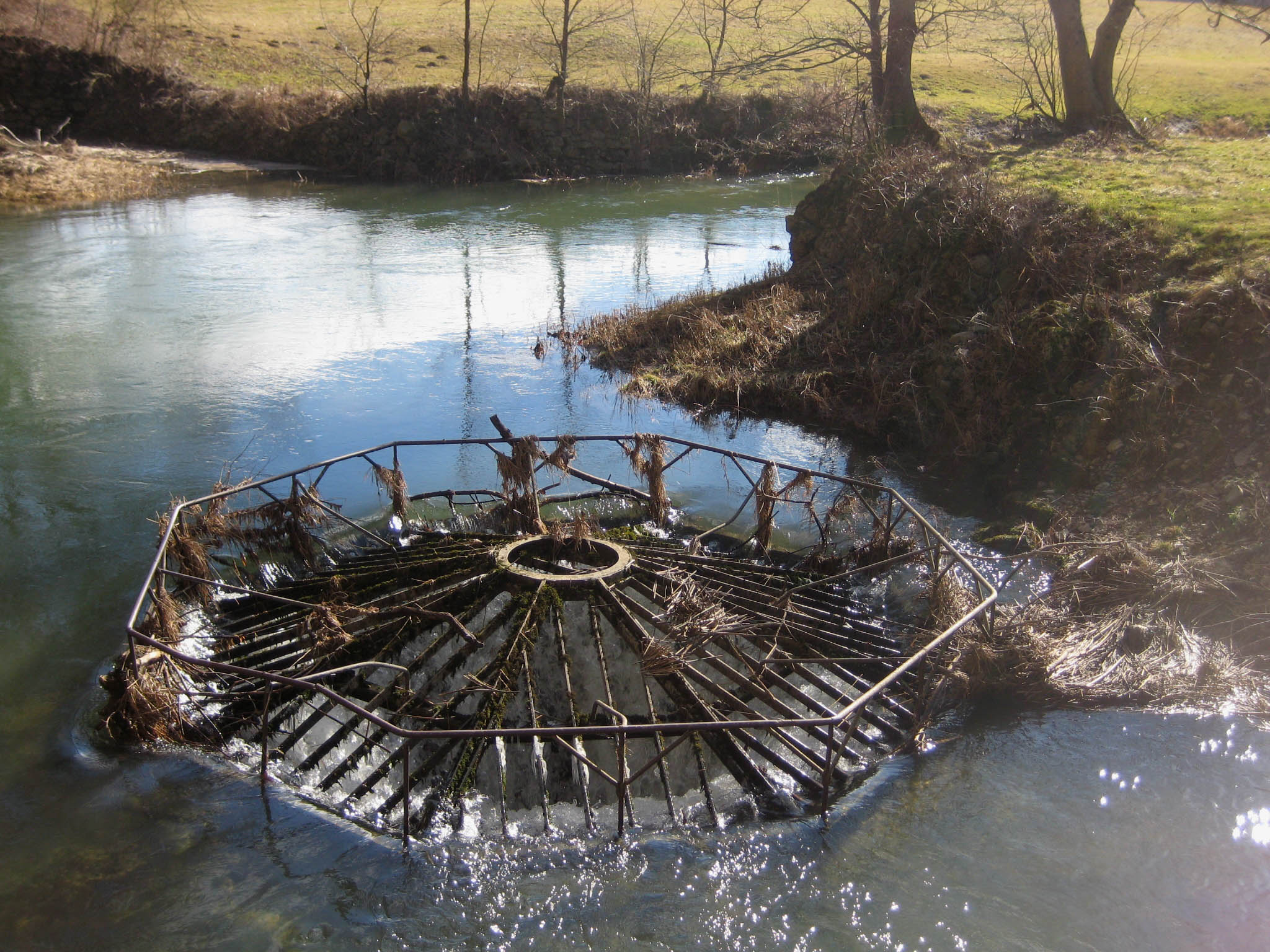
A man-made ponor in Logatec, Slovenia

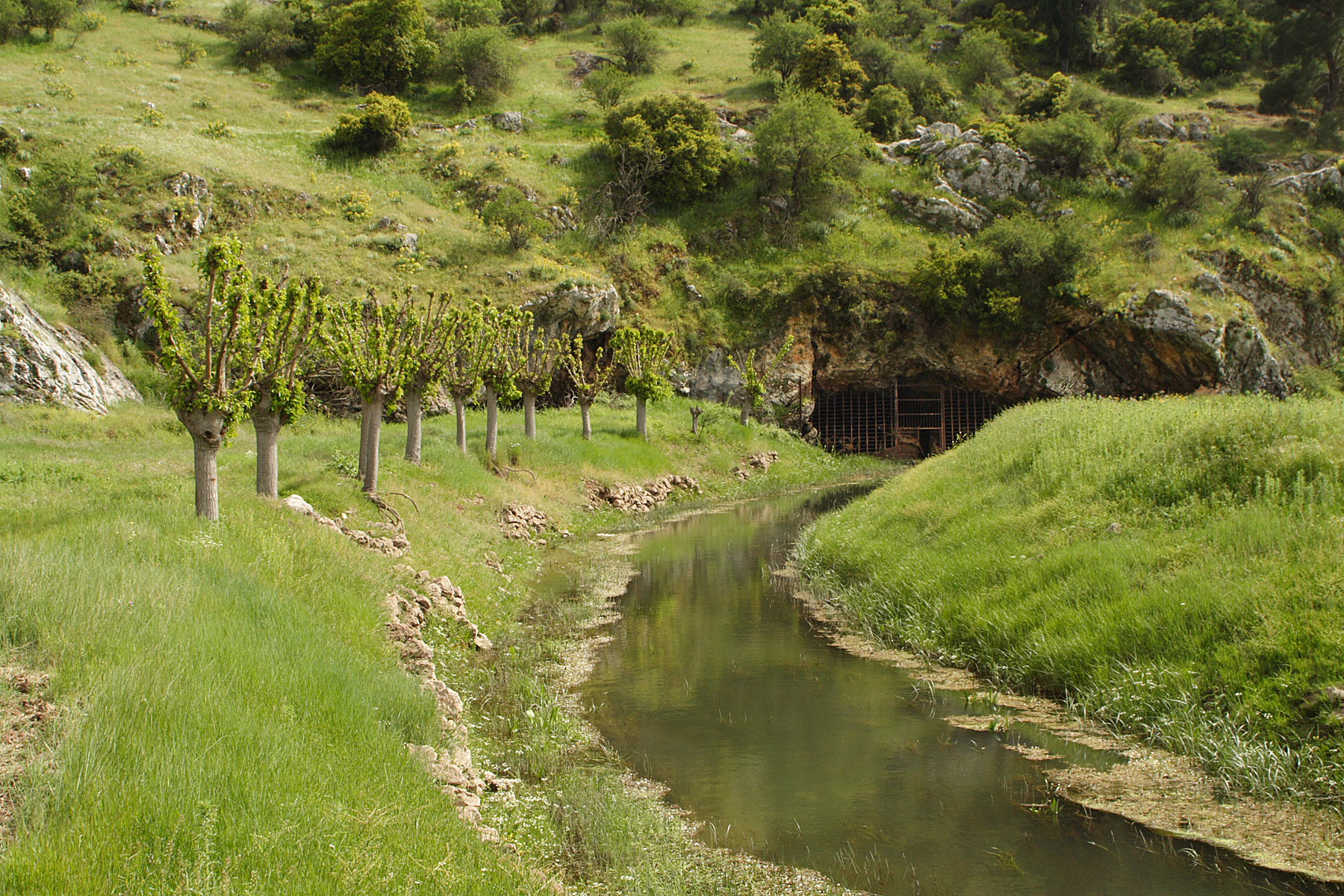
In Polje "Argon Pedion" (untilled plain). Plain and ponor documented since 2nd century AD by Pausanias

== Dams and reservoirs in karst ==
Reservoirs in karst are prone to losses due to leakage through ponors. The construction of dams to capture water in karst terrains may pose a great financial risk despite initial investigations and thorough sealing treatments. It wasn't until the twentieth century that the first dams in karst were built, some of which famously failed.

== See also ==
- Karst spring
- Losing stream
