= Mramor (Niš) =

Village in Niš municipality, Serbia

- Village
- Interactive map of Mramor
- Country: Serbia
- District: Nišava District
- Municipality: Niš
- Time zone: UTC+1 (CET)
  - Summer (DST): UTC+2 (CEST)

Mramor is a village situated in Niš municipality in Serbia.
