= Trmbas =

Trmbas Трмбас (Serbian)
- Village
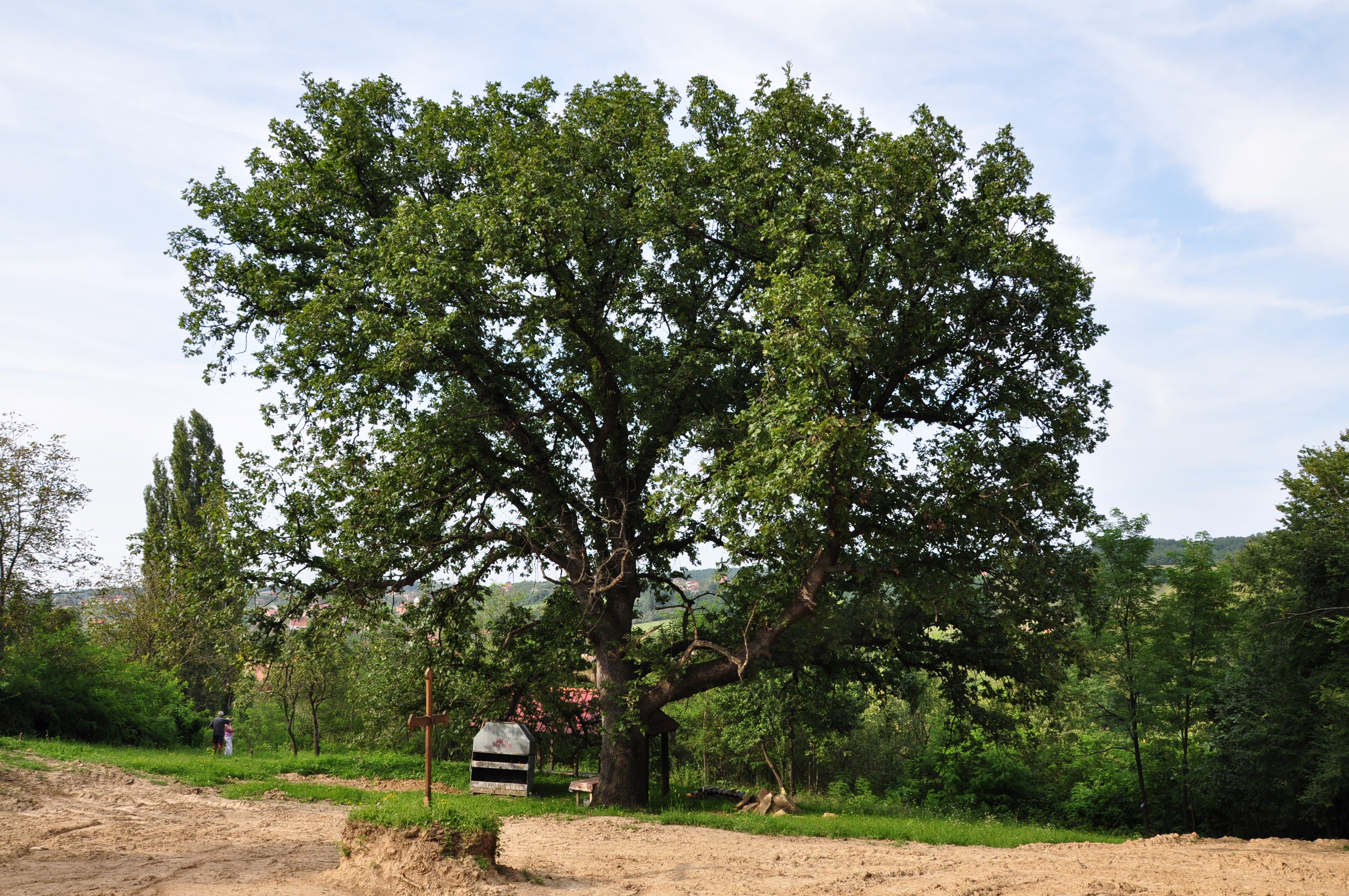
- Zapis - Sacred Tree, Оак in village Trmbas, municipality Kragujevac, Serbia

- Location within Serbia
- Coordinates: 43°59′10″N 20°59′00″E
- Country: Serbia
- Region: Šumadija and Western Serbia
- District: Šumadija
- Municipality: Kragujevac
- Elevation: 920 ft (280 m)

Population (2011)
  - Total: 814
- Time zone: UTC+1 (CET)
  - Summer (DST): UTC+2 (CEST)

Trmbas is a village in the municipality of Kragujevac, Serbia. According to the 2011 census, the village has a population of 814 inhabitants.

== Population ==
Population of Trmbas
1948	1953	1961	1971	1981	1991	2002	2011
461	430	448	685	1135	459	595	814
