= Gaglovo =

Coordinates: 43°34′13″N 21°25′33″E

- Village
- Interactive map of Gaglovo
- Country: Serbia
- District: Rasina District
- Municipality: Kruševac

Population (2002)
  - Total: 811
- Time zone: UTC+1 (CET)
  - Summer (DST): UTC+2 (CEST)

Gaglovo (Serbian Cyrillic: Гaглово) is a village in the municipality of Kruševac, Serbia. According to the 2002 census, the village has a population of 811 people.
