= Žeravino =

Žeravino/Zheravino Жеравино
- Village
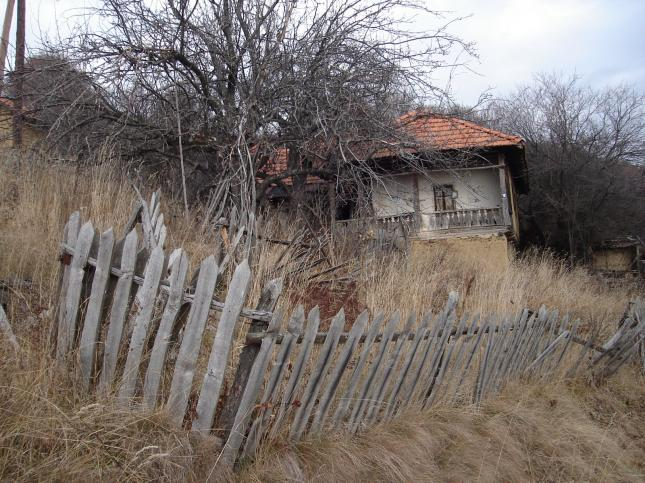
- Abandoned house in Žeravino

- Location within Bulgaria
- Coordinates: 42°19′N 22°21′E
- Country: Bulgaria/Serbia
- Province/District: Kyustendil Province/Pčinja District
- Municipality/Municipality: Kyustendil/Bosilegrad

Population (2011/2002)
  - Total: 3/21
- Time zone: UTC+2/+1 (EET/CET)
  - Summer (DST): UTC+3/+2 (EEST/CEST)

Žeravino (Serbian Cyrillic: Жеравино) or Zheravino is a divided village in easternmost Serbia and westernmost Bulgaria. The Bulgarian half of the village is part of Kyustendil municipality, Kyustendil Province, whereas the Serbian part belongs to Bosilegrad municipality, Pčinja District.

According to the 2011 census, the Bulgarian part of village has a population of 3 people. According to the 2002 census, the Serbian village has a population of 21 people.
