= Donja Sabanta =

Donja Sabanta Доња Сабанта (Serbian)
- Location in Serbia
- Coordinates: 43°57′14″N 20°57′51″E
- Country: Serbia
- Region: Šumadija
- District: Šumadija District
- City district: Kragujevac
- Municipality: Pivara

Population
  - Total: 651
- Website: https://donjasabanta.in.rs

Donja Sabanta (Serbian: Доња Сабанта) is a village in Pivara municipality in Kragujevac city district in the Šumadija District of central Serbia.

It has a population of 651.
