= Ponor, Olovo =

Village in Olovo, Bosnia and Herzegovina

Ponor
- Village
- Location within Bosnia and Herzegovina
- Coordinates: 44.0883971°N 18.6134653°E
- Country: Bosnia and Herzegovina
- Entity: Federation of Bosnia and Herzegovina
- Canton: Zenica-Doboj
- Municipality: Olovo

Area
  - Total: 1.30 sq mi (3.37 km^{2})

Population (2013)
  - Total: 5
  - Density: 3.8/sq mi (1.5/km^{2})
- Time zone: UTC+1 (CET)
  - Summer (DST): UTC+2 (CEST)

Ponor is a village in the municipality of Olovo, Bosnia and Herzegovina.

== Demographics ==
According to the 2013 census, its population was 5, all Bosniaks.
