= Bunar =

Coordinates: 43°55′N 21°8′E

- Village
- Interactive map of Bunar
- Country: Serbia
- District: Pomoravlje District
- Municipality: Jagodina

Population (2002)
  - Total: 495
- Time zone: UTC+1 (CET)
  - Summer (DST): UTC+2 (CEST)

Bunar is a village in the municipality of Jagodina, Serbia. According to the 2002 census, the village has a population of 495 people.
