= Iron Gates =

Gorge on the river Danube between Serbia and Romania

Coordinates: 44°40′16″N 22°31′47″E

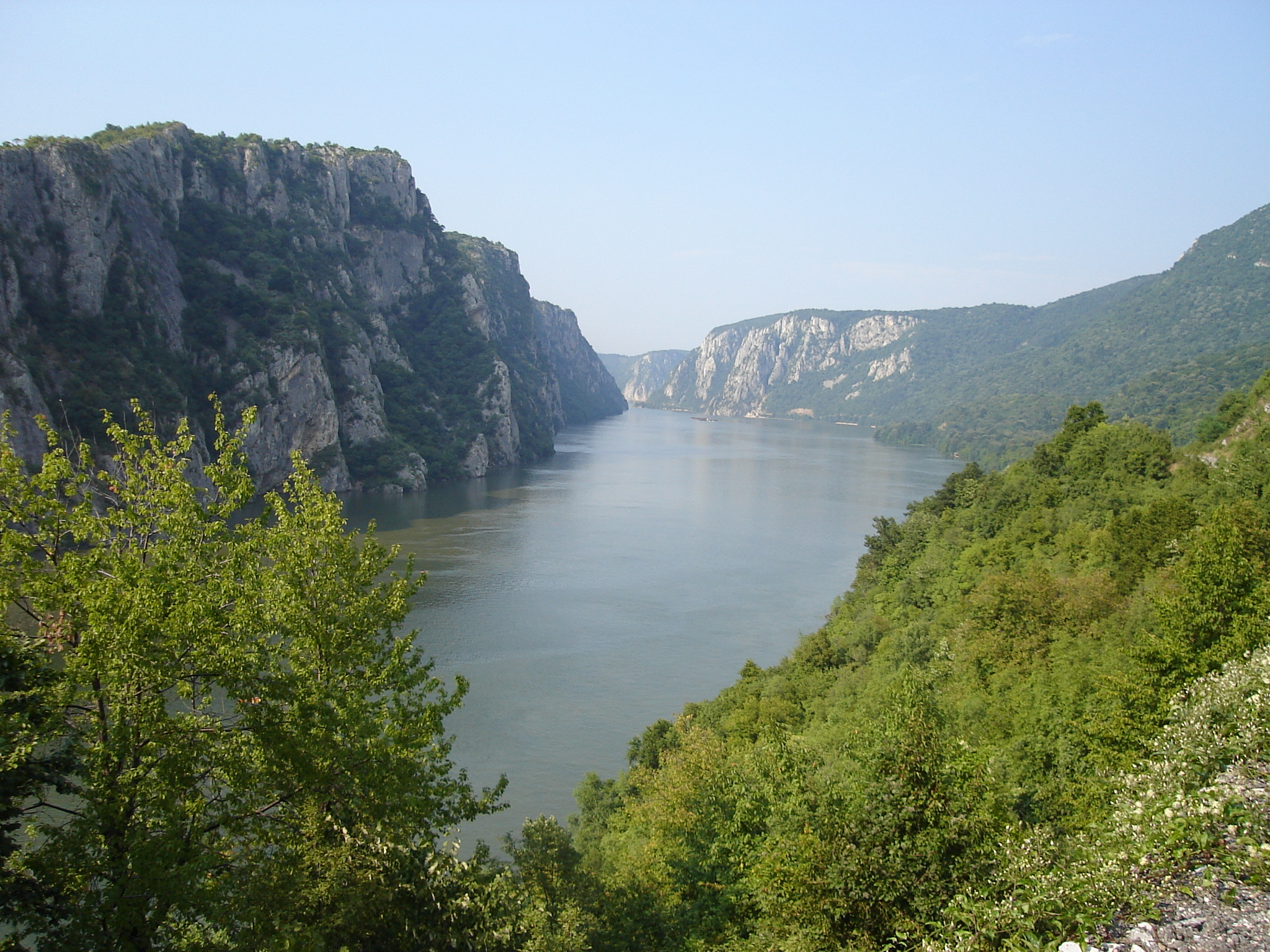
The Iron Gates of the Danube

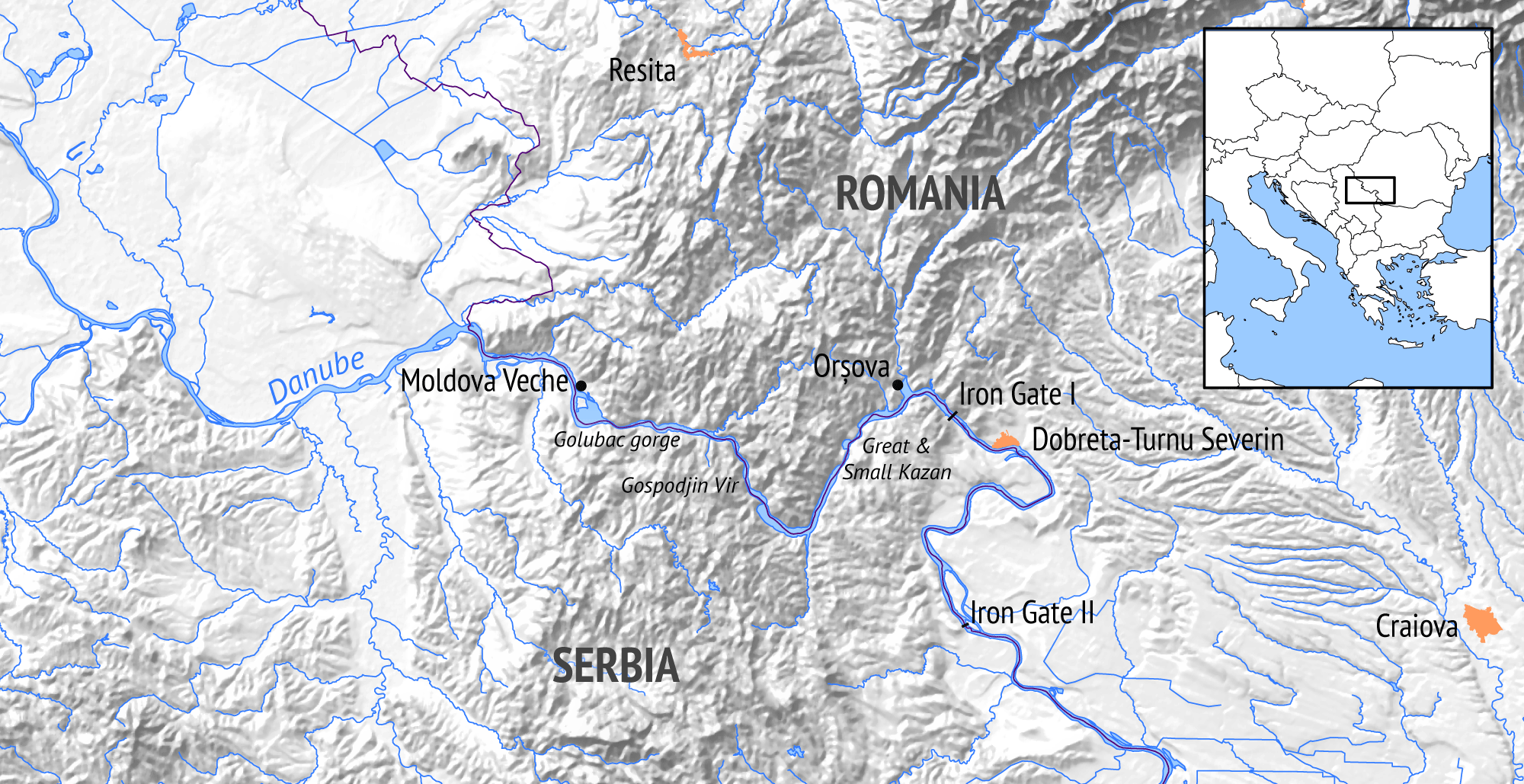
Location of the Iron Gates

The Iron Gates (Romanian: Porțile de Fier; Serbian: Ђердапска клисура, Đerdapska klisura) is a gorge on the river Danube. It forms part of the boundary between Serbia to the south and Romania to the north. In the broad sense it encompasses a route of 134 km (83 mi); in the narrow sense it only encompasses the last barrier on this route, just beyond the Romanian city of Orșova, that contains two hydroelectric dams, with two power stations, Iron Gate I Hydroelectric Power Station and Iron Gate II Hydroelectric Power Station.

At this point in the Danube, the river separates the southern Carpathian Mountains from the northwestern foothills of the Balkan Mountains. The Romanian side of the gorge constitutes the Iron Gates Natural Park, and the Serbian part constitutes the Đerdap National Park. A wider protected area on the Serbian side was declared a UNESCO global geopark in July 2020.

Archaeologists have named the Iron Gates mesolithic culture (dated circa 13,000 to 5,000 years ago) after the gorge. One of the most important archaeological sites in Serbia and Europe is Lepenski Vir, the oldest planned settlement in Europe, located on the banks of the Danube in the Iron Gate gorge.

== Toponymy ==
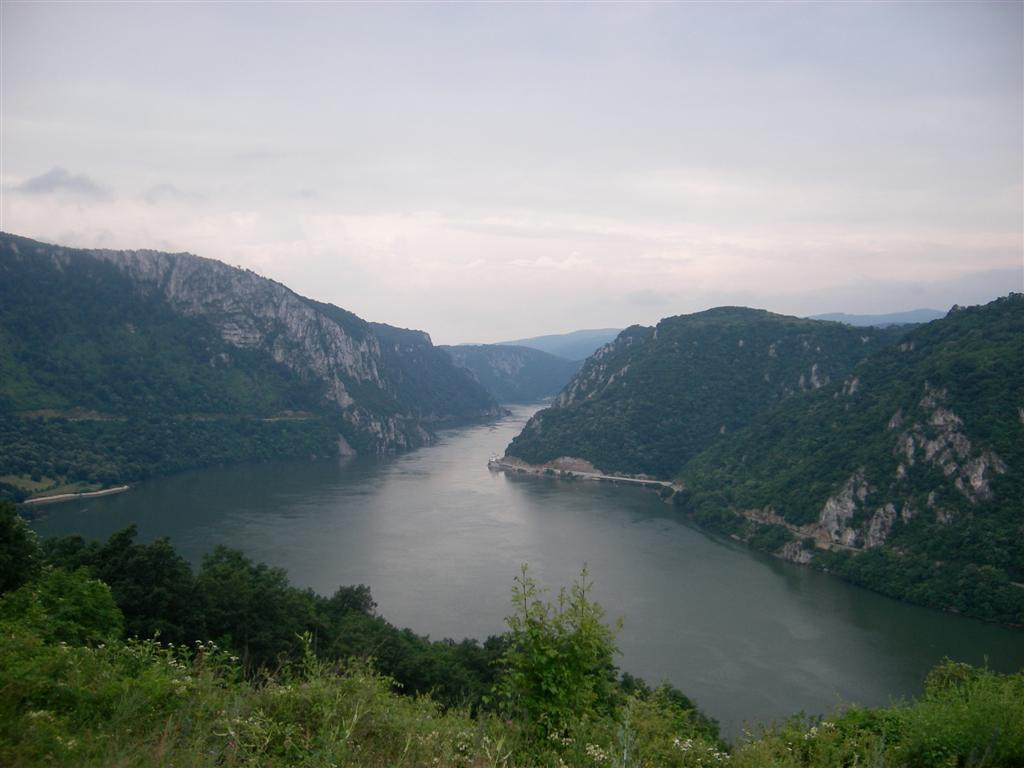
Kazan gorge at its narrowest point

In English, the gorge is known as Iron Gates or Iron Gate. An 1853 article about the Danube in The Times of London referred to it as "the Iron Gate, or the Gate of Trajan."

In languages of the region including Romanian, Hungarian, Polish, Slovak, Czech, German, and Bulgarian, names literally meaning "Iron Gates" are used to name the entire range of gorges. These names are Romanian: Porțile de Fier (pronounced [ˈport͡sile de ˈfjer]), Hungarian: Vaskapu, Slovak: Železné vráta, Polish: Żelazne Wrota, German: Eisernes Tor, and Bulgarian: Железни врата Železni vrata. An alternative Romanian name for the last part of the route is Defileul Dunării, literally "Danube Gorge".

In Serbian, the gorge is known as Đerdap (Ђердап; Serbo-Croatian pronunciation: [d͡ʑě̞rdaːp]), with the last part named Đerdapska klisura (Ђердапска клисура; Serbo-Croatian pronunciation: [d͡ʑě̞rdaːpskaː klǐsura], meaning Đerdap Gorge) from the Byzantine Greek Κλεισούρα (kleisoura), standing for "enclosure" or "pass."

Both Đerdap and the former Serbian name, Demir-kapija, are Turkish in origin. Demir-kapija means "iron gate" (demirkapı) and a translation of it entered most of the other languages as the name of the gorge, while đerdap comes from girdap which means whirlpool, vortex.

== Natural physical features ==
=== Gorges ===
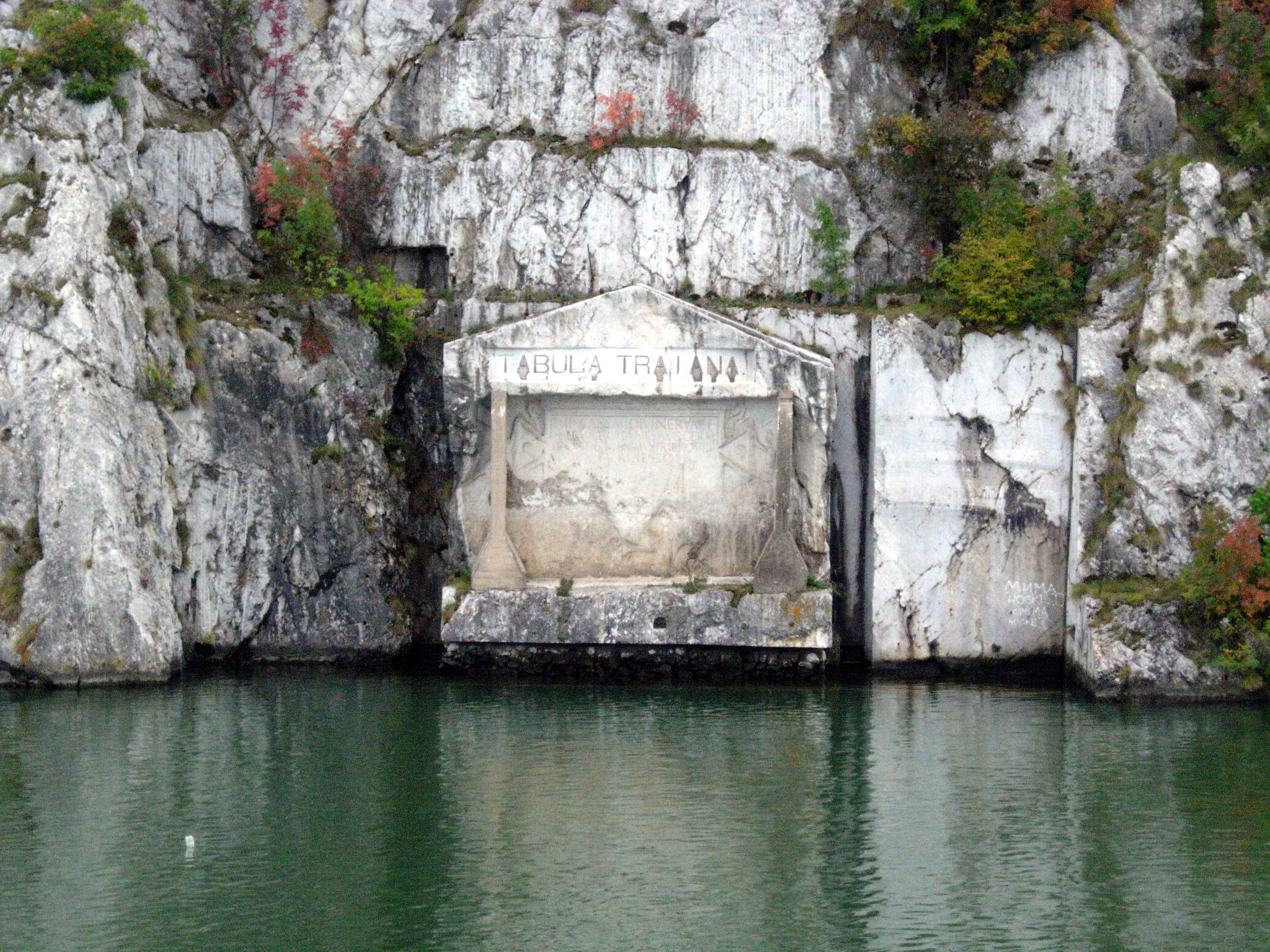
The Roman plaque "Tabula Traiana", Serbia

The first narrowing of the Danube lies beyond the Romanian isle of Moldova Veche and is known as the Golubac gorge. It is 14.5 km long and 230 m (755 ft) wide at the narrowest point. At its head, there is a medieval fort at Golubac, on the Serbian bank. Through the valley of Ljupovska lies the second gorge, Gospodjin Vir, which is 15 km long and narrows to 220 m (722 ft). The cliffs scale to 500 m and are the most difficult to reach here from land. The broader Donji Milanovac forms the connection with the Great and the Small Kazan gorge, which have a combined length of 19 km (12 mi). The Orșova valley is the last broad section before the river reaches the plains of Wallachia at the last gorge, the Sip gorge.

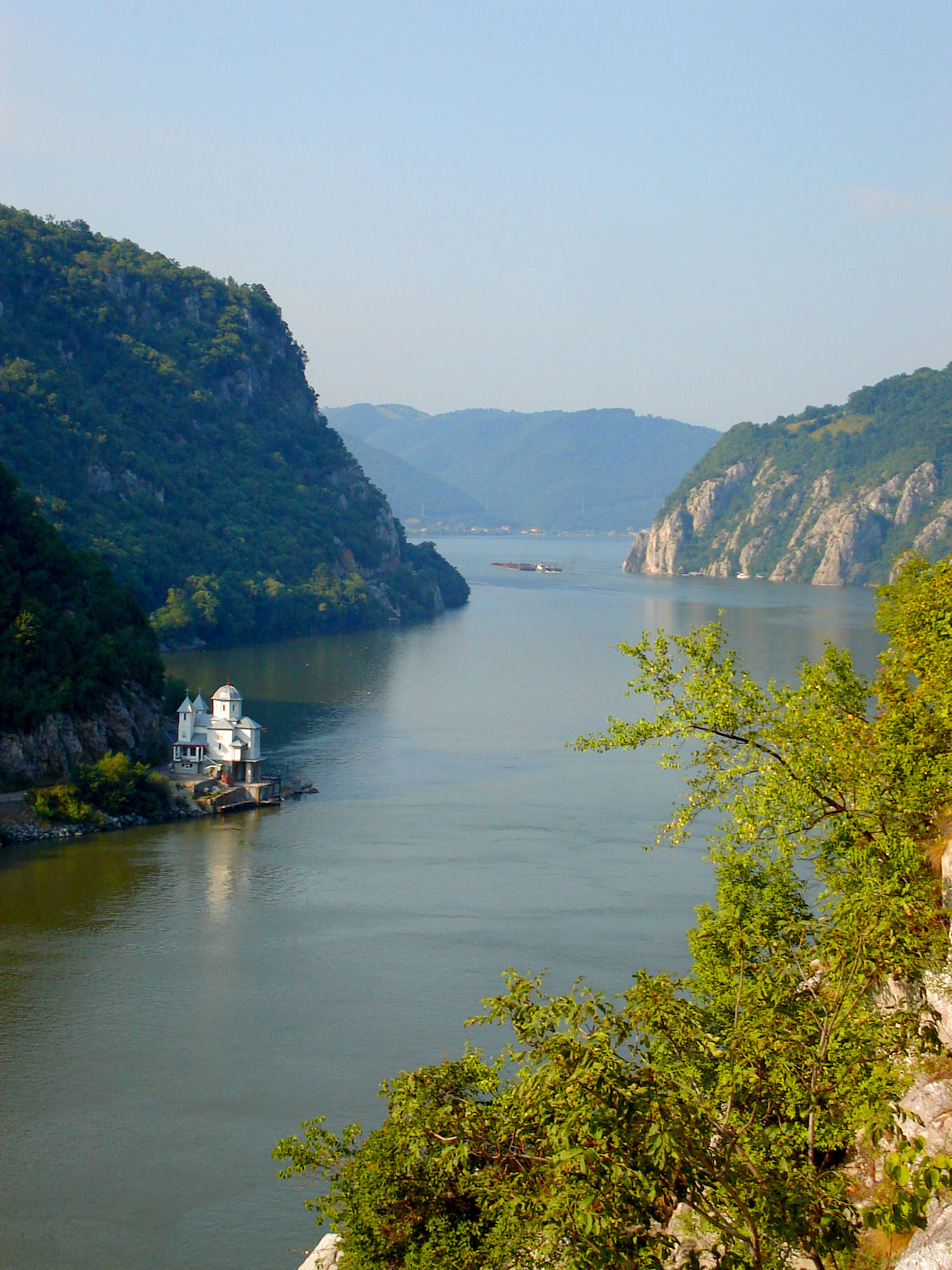

The Great Kazan (kazan meaning "cauldron" or "reservoir") is the most famous and the most narrow gorge of the whole route: the river here narrows to 150 m and reaches a depth of up to 53 m (174 ft).

=== Navigation and channels ===
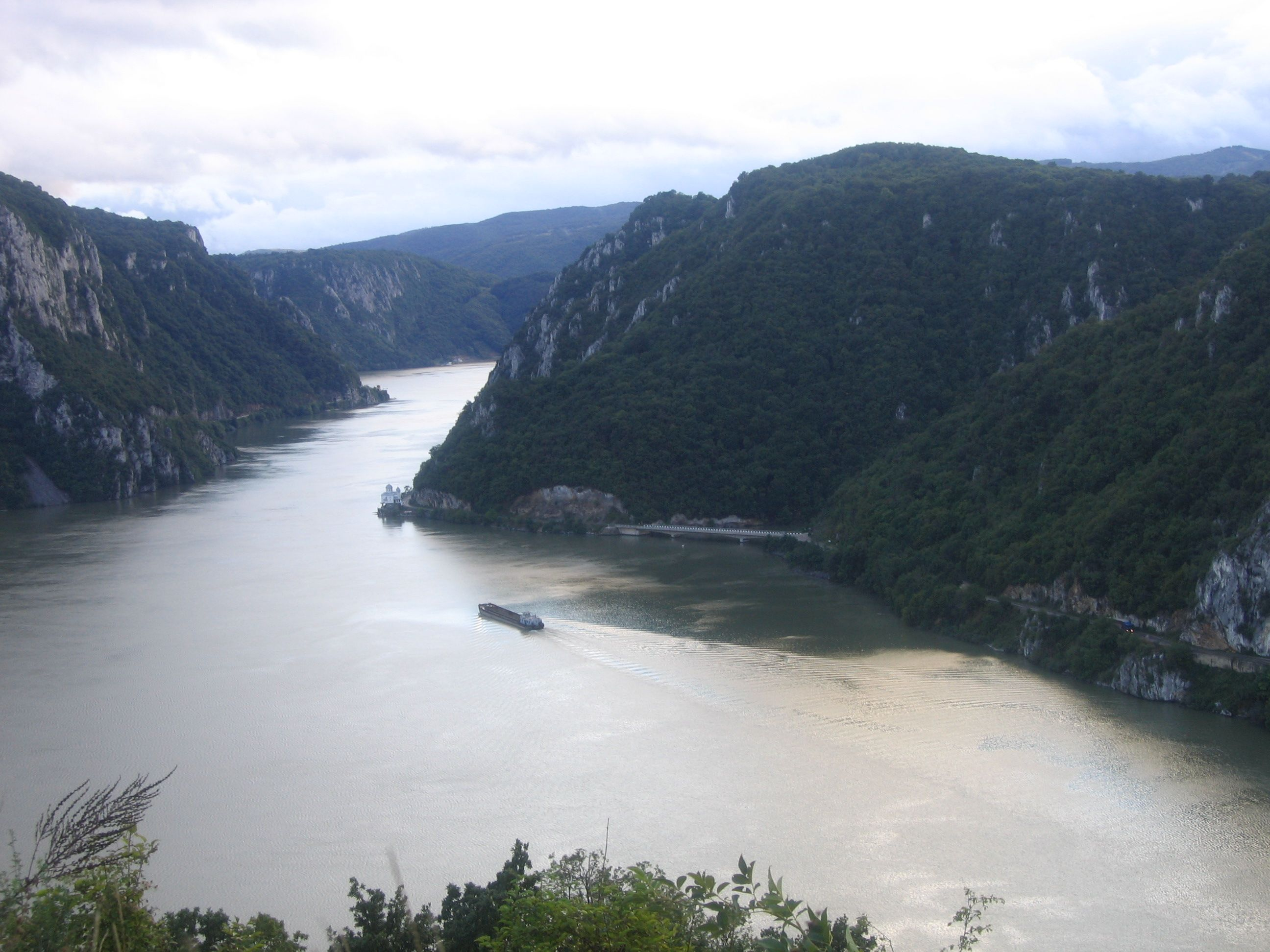

The riverbed rocks and the associated rapids made the gorge valley an infamous passage for shipping, even for the most seasoned boatmen. During the period of the Ottoman rule, the ships were guided through by the local navigators, familiar with the routes, called kalauz (from Turkish kılavuz, meaning guide, travel leader). During the rule of prince Miloš Obrenović, local Serbs gradually took over from the Ottomans, being officially appointed by the prince. In order not to displease the Ottomans further, the prince named Serbian navigators by a Turkish name, dumendžibaša, from dümen (rudder) and baş (head, chief, master). The navigation fee was divided among dumendžibaša, loc (river pilots) and regional municipalities.

In German, the passage is still known as the Kataraktenstrecke, even though the cataracts are gone. Near the actual "Iron Gates" strait the Prigrada rock was the most important obstacle (until 1896): the river widened considerably here and the water level was consequently low. Upstream, the Greben rock near the "Kazan" gorge was notorious.

Some of the channels created included:

- Stenka, 1,900 m (6,200 ft) long, with 10 navigational signals (originally, the balloons were used)
- Izlaz-Tahatlija, 2,351 m (7,713 ft), with 7 signals
- Svinița, 1,200 m (3,900 ft), with 4 signals
- Juc, 1,260 m (4,130 ft), with 5 signals
- Sip, 4,375 m (14,354 ft)
- Mali Đerdap, 1,050 m (3,440 ft), as an extension of Sip Channel

In total, 15,465 m (50,738 ft) of navigable channels was created. They were flooded when the artificial Lake Đerdap was created (early 1970s). The results of these efforts were slightly disappointing. The currents in the Sip Channel were so strong at 15 kn (7.7 m/s) that until 1973, ships had to be dragged upstream along the canal by locomotive. The Iron Gates thus remained an obstacle of note.

=== Dams ===
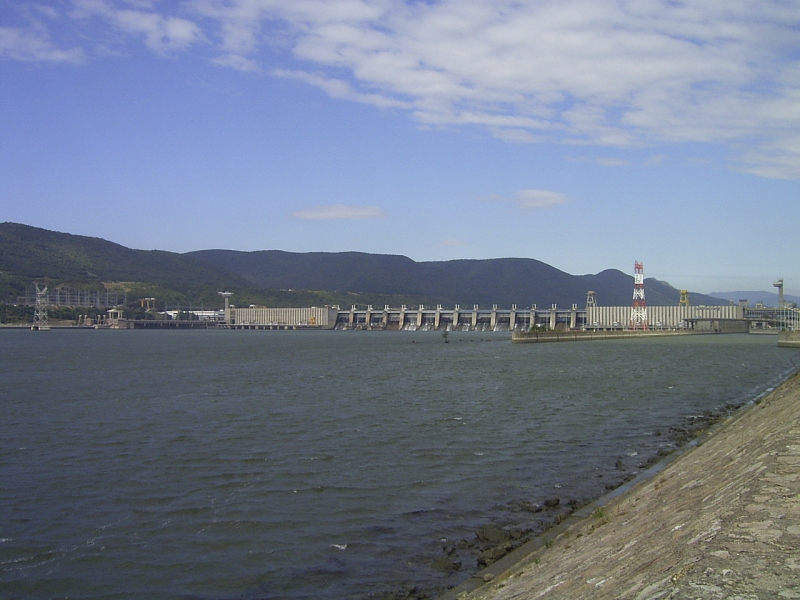
Iron Gate I dam

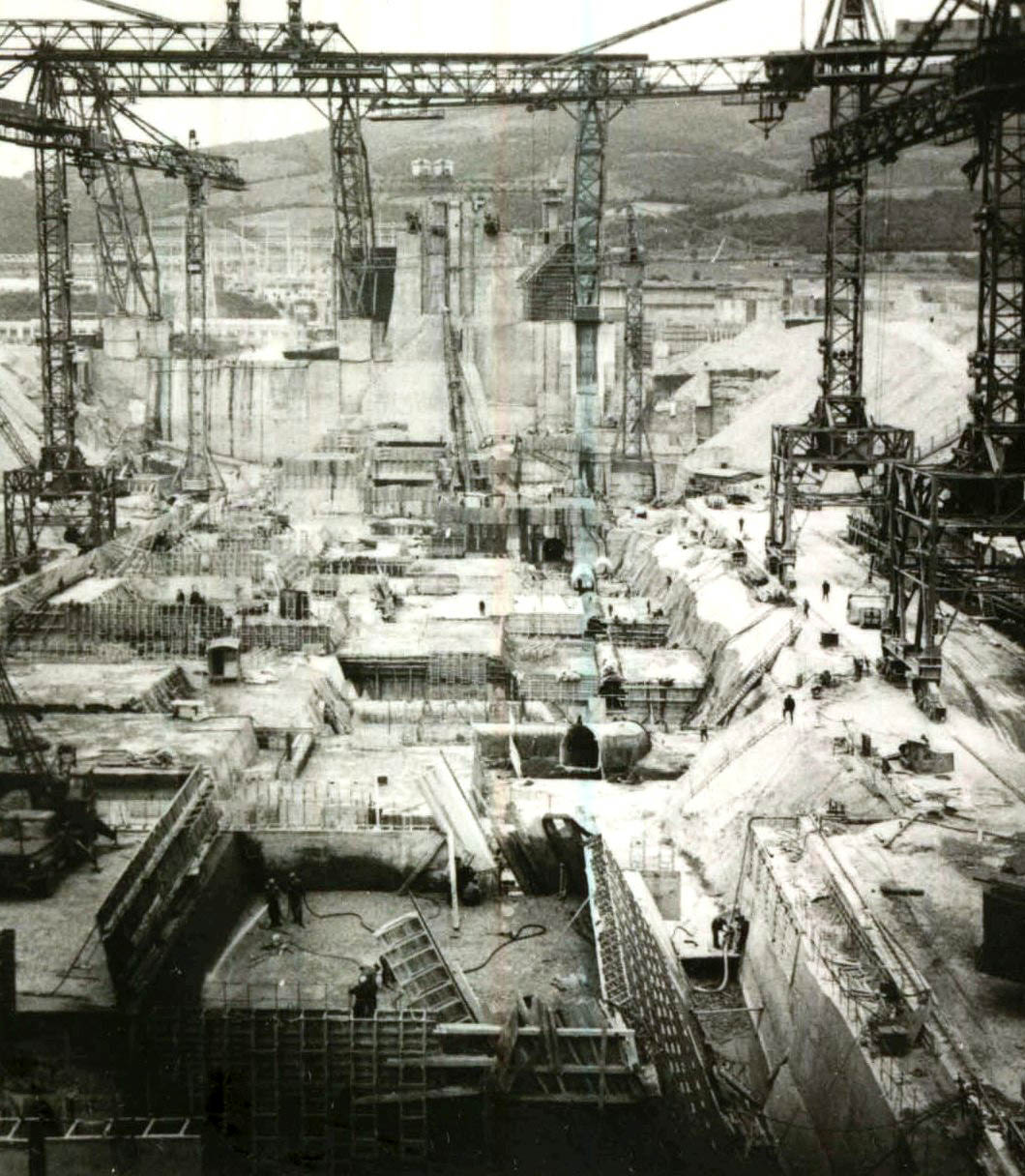
Hydropower site Iron Gates (1970)

The construction of the joint Romanian-Yugoslavian mega project commenced in 1964. In 1972 the Iron Gate I Dam was opened, followed by Iron Gate II Dam, in 1984, along with two hydroelectric power stations, two sluices and navigation locks for shipping.

The construction of these dams gave the valley of the Danube below Belgrade the nature of a reservoir, and additionally caused a 35 m rise in the water level of the river near the dam. The old Orșova, the Danube island of Ada Kaleh (below) and at least five other villages, totaling a population of 17,000, had to make way. People were relocated and the settlements have been submerged.

When designed and built without adequate attention to the natural functioning of a river, dams have the effect of cutting a river into ecologically isolated compartments, which do not allow free movement and migration of species. Migratory fish are particularly badly hit, being rendered unable to move upstream or downstream between their spawning grounds and areas used at other times in their life cycle. The construction of the Iron Gates had a major impact on the local fauna and flora as well—for example, the spawning routes of several species of sturgeon were permanently interrupted. Beluga sturgeon was the largest, and the largest specimen was recorded in 1793, at 500 kg (1,100 lb). There have also been significant regional economic impacts – notably on the productivity of Danube fisheries. The status of the Danube's migratory fish species is a strong indicator of the ecological health of the entire Danube River Basin, which in turn has wider economic and strategic consequences.

The flora and fauna, as well as the geomorphological, archaeological and cultural historical artifacts of the Iron Gates have been under the protection of both nations since the construction of the dam. In Serbia this was done with the Đerdap National Park (since 1974, 636.08 km^{2} (245.59 sq mi)) and in Romania by the Porțile de Fier National Park (since 2001, 1,156.55 km^{2} (446.55 sq mi)).

== History ==
=== Prehistoric and Roman era ===
Sandstone statues dated to the early Neolithic era indicate that the area has been inhabited for a very long time. Even more significant are the Iron Gates Mesolithic (c. 13,000 to 5,000 BP) sites – in particular, the gorge of Gospodjin Vir, which contains the major archaeological site of Lepenski Vir (unearthed in the 1960s). Lepenski Vir is often regarded as the most important Mesolithic site in south-east Europe.

The Danube was part of the roman frontier and the Iron Gates were situated within the section of the limes moesicus. East of the Great Kazan the Roman emperor Trajan built the legendary bridge erected by Apollodorus of Damascus. Construction of the bridge ran from 103 through 105, preceding Trajan's final conquest of Dacia. (On the right (Serbian) bank, a Roman plaque commemorates him). On the Romanian bank, at the Small Kazan, a likeness of Decebalus, Trajan's Dacian opponent, was carved in rock in 1994–2004.)

=== Ada Kaleh ===
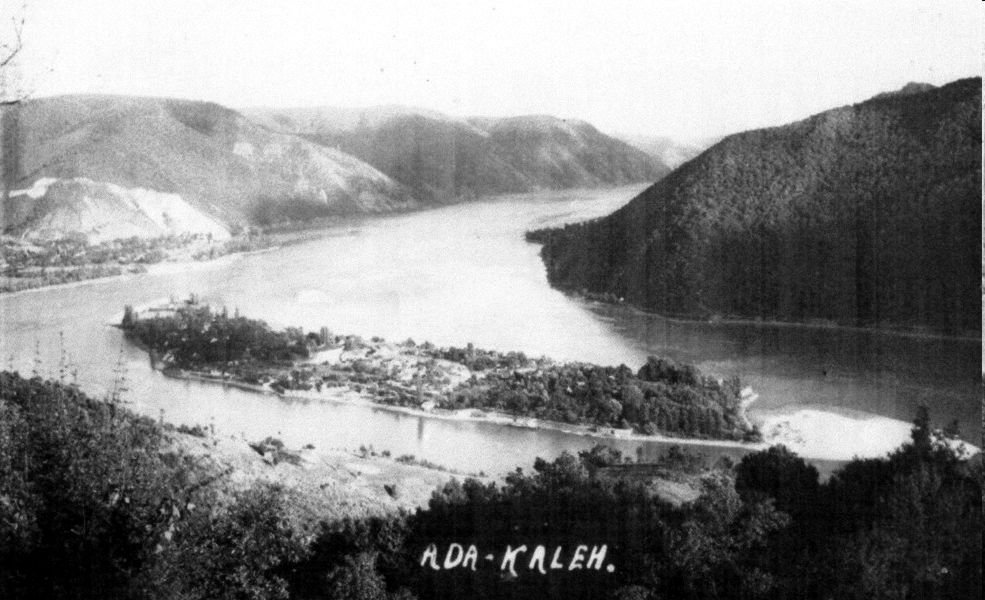
Ada Kaleh in the 19th century

Perhaps the most evocative consequence of the Đerdap dam's construction was the flooding of an islet named Ada Kaleh. A former Turkish exclave, it had a mosque and a thousand twisting alleys, and was known as a free port and smuggler's nest. Many other ethnic groups lived there beside Turks.

The island was about 3 km (1.9 mi) downstream from Orșova and measured 1.7 by 0.4–0.5 km. It was walled; the Austrians built a fort there in 1669 to defend it from the Turks, and that fort would remain a bone of contention for the two empires. In 1699 the island came under Turkish control, from 1716 to 1718 it was Austrian, after a four-month siege in 1738 it was Turkish again, followed by the Austrians reconquering it in 1789, only to have to yield it to the Turks in the following peace treaty.

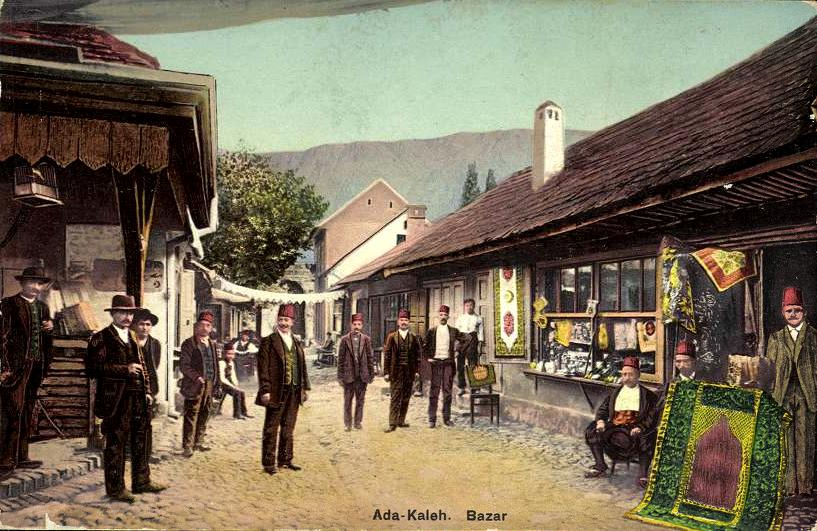
Ada Kaleh in 1912

Thereafter, the island lost its military importance. The 1878 Congress of Berlin forced the Ottoman Empire to retreat far into the south, but the island remained the property of the Turkish sultan, allegedly because the treaty neglected to mention it. The inhabitants enjoyed exemption from taxes and customs and were not conscripted. In 1923, when the Ottoman monarchy had disappeared, the island was given to Romania in the Treaty of Lausanne.

The people of that island (about 400-500) were formed of Muslim Turks with many other small communities (Romanian, Hungarian, German) also represented.

=== 19th-century Hungarian initiatives ===
By the early 19th century, freedom of navigation on the Danube was regarded as important by many different states in the region and beyond. Allowing passage through the Iron Gates by larger vessels had become a priority. By 1831 a plan had been drafted to make the passage navigable, at the initiative of Hungarian politician István Széchenyi. Not being satisfied with the solutions compiled by the Austrio-Hungarian government and the Austro-Turkish commission, the government of Hungary formed its own commission for the organization of the navigation through the Iron Gates. The project was finished in 1883. Appointed in 1883 and again in 1886, Minister of Trade and Transportation Gábor Baross, Hungary's "Iron Minister", presided over modernization projects at Hungary's sea port in Fiume (Rijeka), and regulation of the Upper Danube and Iron Gate.

Works on the gorge section were done by the Hungarian Technical Administration over 11 years from 1889. The works were divided in two sectors, the upper and the lower Iron Gates. The channels in the upper section, at the town of Orșova (the tripoint between Austria-Hungary, Romania and Serbia at the time) were up to 60 m (197 ft) wide and 2 m (7 ft) deep, at the zero water level in Orșova. In the southern section, the channels were 60 m (197 ft) wide and 3 m (10 ft) deep, except for the Sip Channel, which was 73 m (240 ft) wide. In 1890, near Orșova, the last border town of Hungary, rocks were cleared by explosion over a 2 km (1.2 mi) stretch in order to create channels. A spur of the Greben Ridge was removed across a length of over 2 km (1.2 mi). Here, a depth of 2 m (7 ft) sufficed. On 17 September 1896, the Sip Canal thus created (named after the Serbian Sip village on the right bank) was inaugurated by the Austro-Hungarian emperor Franz Joseph, the Romanian king Carol I, and the Serbian king Alexander Obrenovich.

== Cultural references to the Iron Gates ==
=== Literature ===
- A plan to blow up the Iron Gates gorge and thereby block the Danube grain trade is included in the proposed acts of sabotage in the Balkan Trilogy section of the Fortunes of War novels (1960–1980) by Olivia Manning. A similar plot device, to prevent oil barges reaching Nazi Germany, is used by Dennis Wheatley in his 1946 Duke de Richleau novel, Codeword: Golden Fleece.
- Two novels – The Valley of Horses (1982) and The Plains of Passage (1990) – in Jean M. Auel's series Earth's Children focus on the difficulties of prehistoric people traveling through or around the Iron Gates; in both novels this topic is described during scene sequences of travel adventures whilst navigating between the upper and lower Danube valleys.
- The 1986 book Between the Woods and the Water, by travel writer Patrick Leigh Fermor, describes a night on the now submerged island Ada Kaleh and a trip by ferry through the Iron Gates, in August, 1934.
- The 2016 book Threads, The Fabric of Family Lives Pulled Apart By War, by D. W. Hoffman (2016) describes an escape attempt by Czech refugees hoping to reach Palestine in August 1940 aboard a derelict paddlewheel steamer. They were detained at Donji by the Serbs and later the Bulgarians and Romanians, all of whom were afraid to allow the craft to pass, fearing it would sink in the Iron Gates and block critical wartime traffic.
- Mór Jókai's 1872 novel The Man with the Golden Touch starts with a lengthy description of the gorge. Many of the main characters are introduced during a voyage through the Iron Gates on a merchant vessel towed up the river.

=== Film ===
- The 2003 film Donau, Duna, Dunaj, Dunav, Dunarea contains several minutes of film of the Iron Gates.

=== Music ===
- The Iron Gates are mentioned in the second verse of the Zvonko Bogdan song Rastao sam pored Dunava.
- The folk song Jugoslavijo by Milutin Popović, commonly called Od Vardara pa do Triglava, includes a mention of the Iron Gates in the beginning.

== Gallery ==
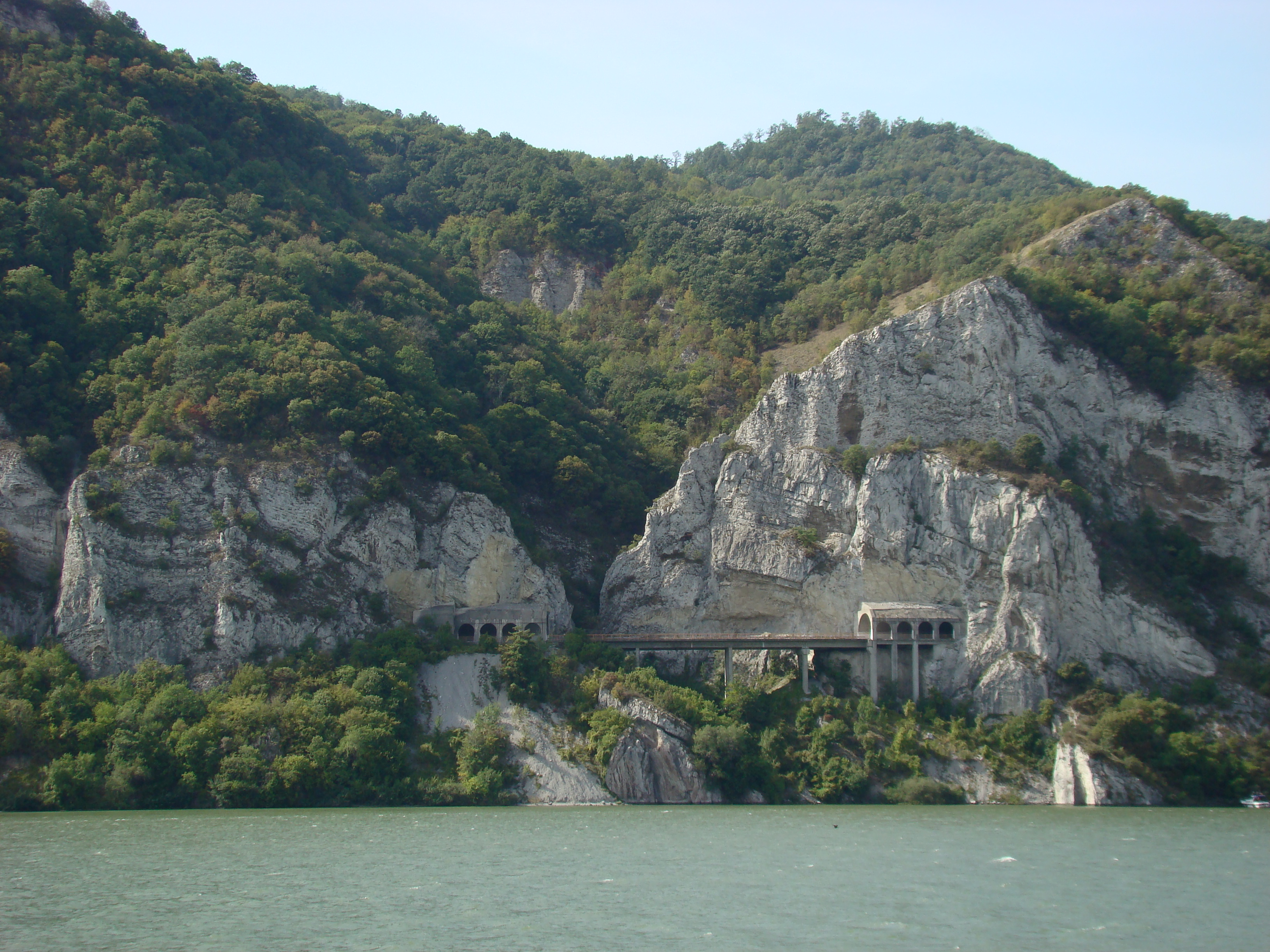

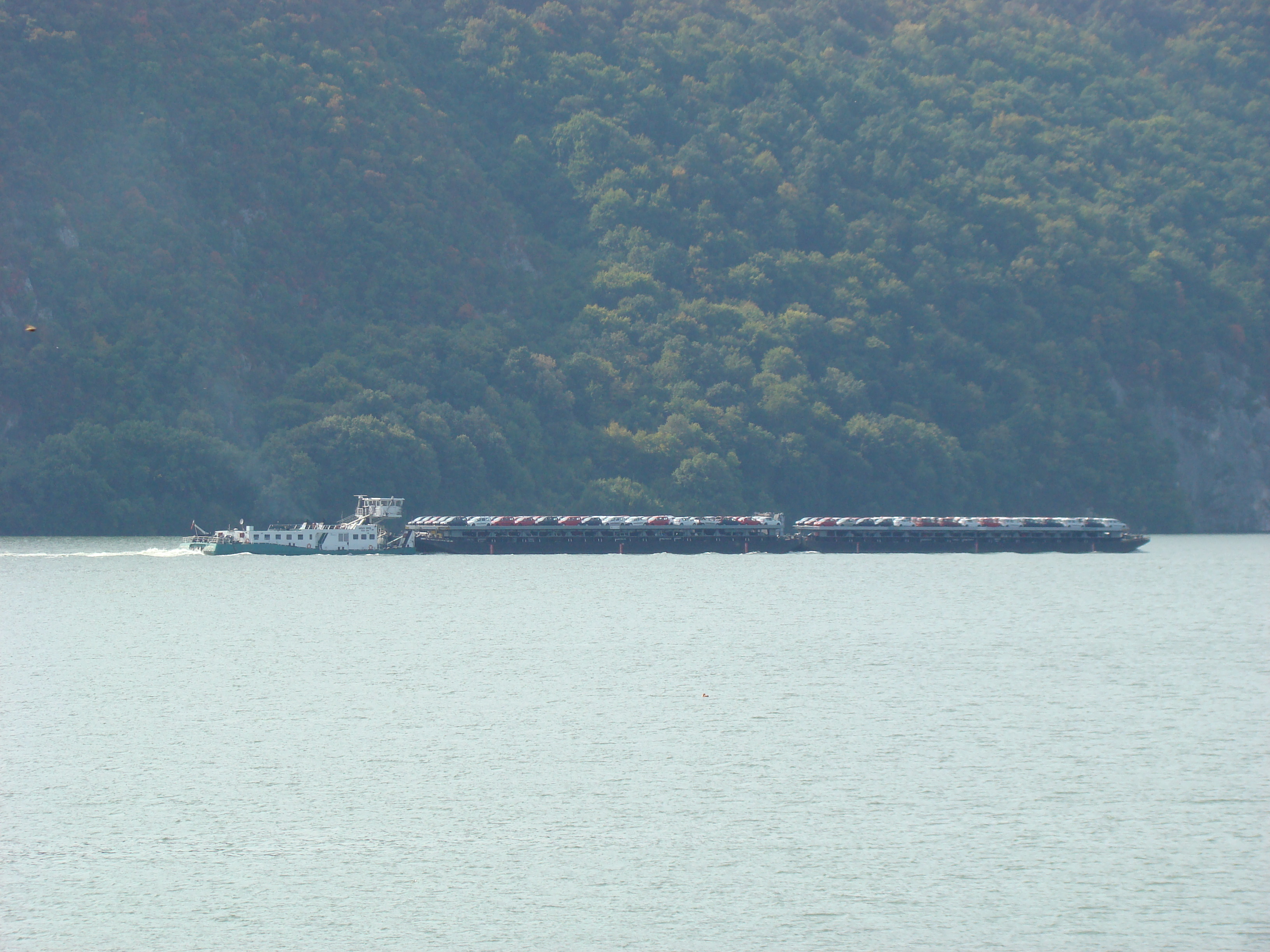

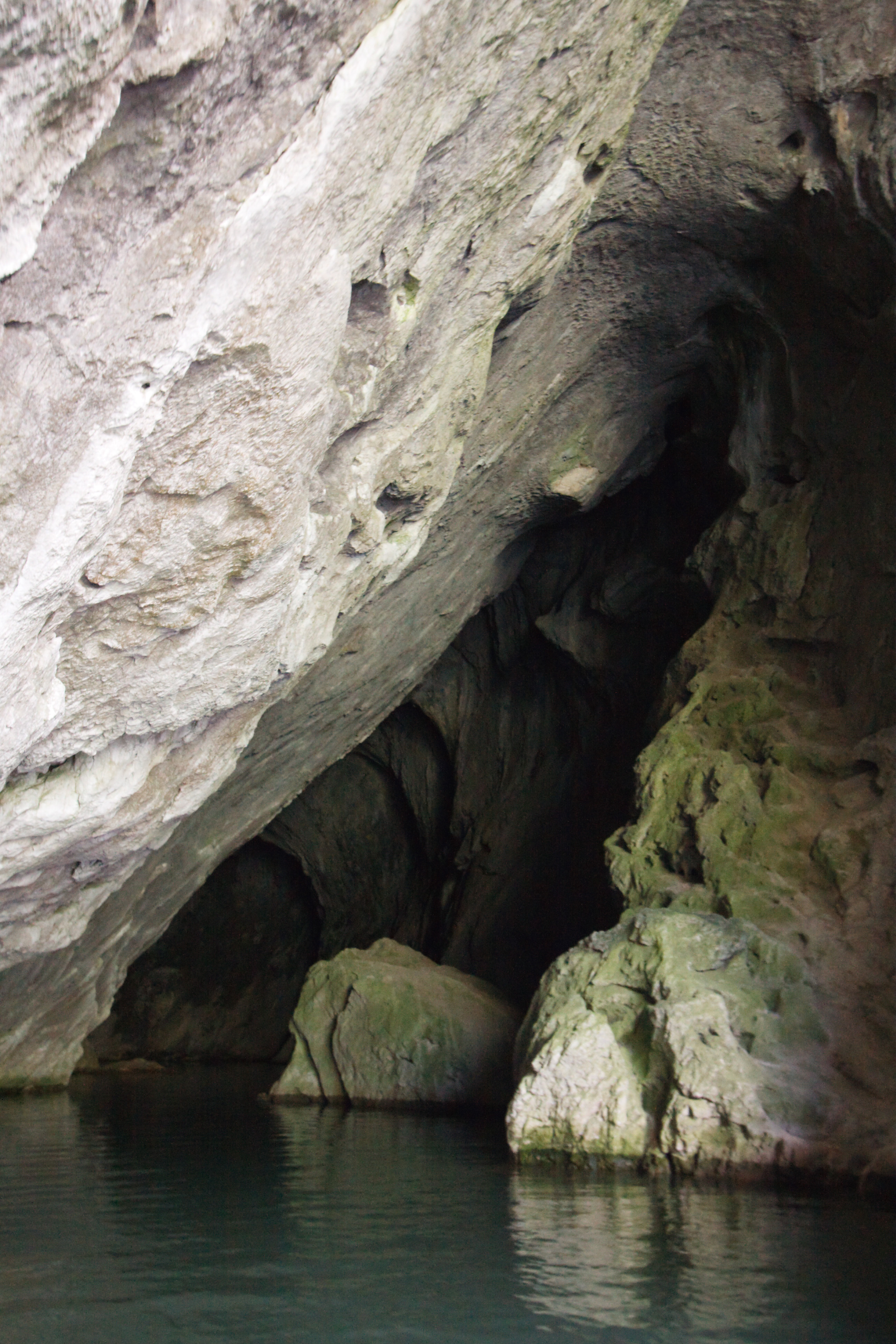
Ponicova cave

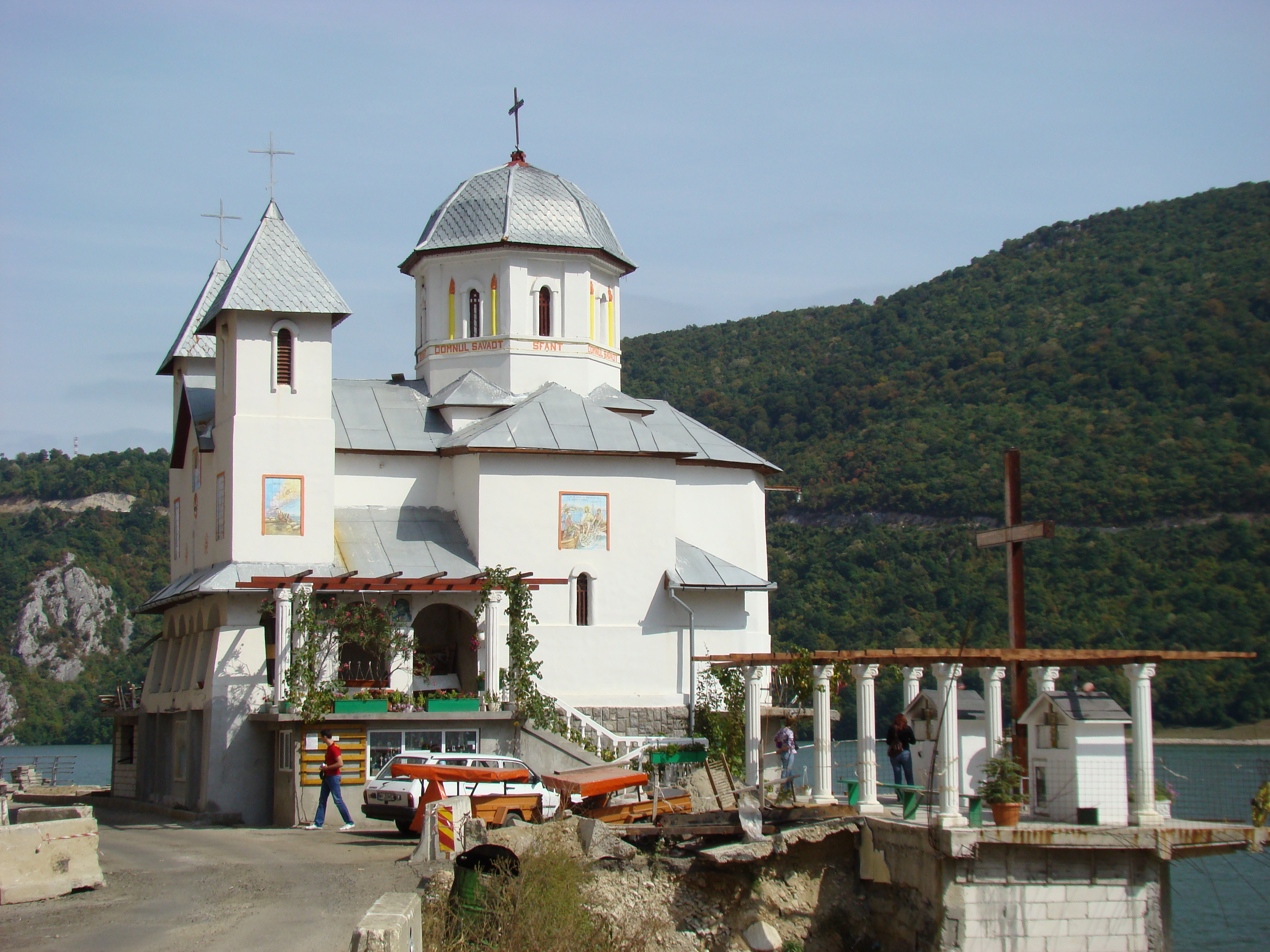
Mraconia Monastery

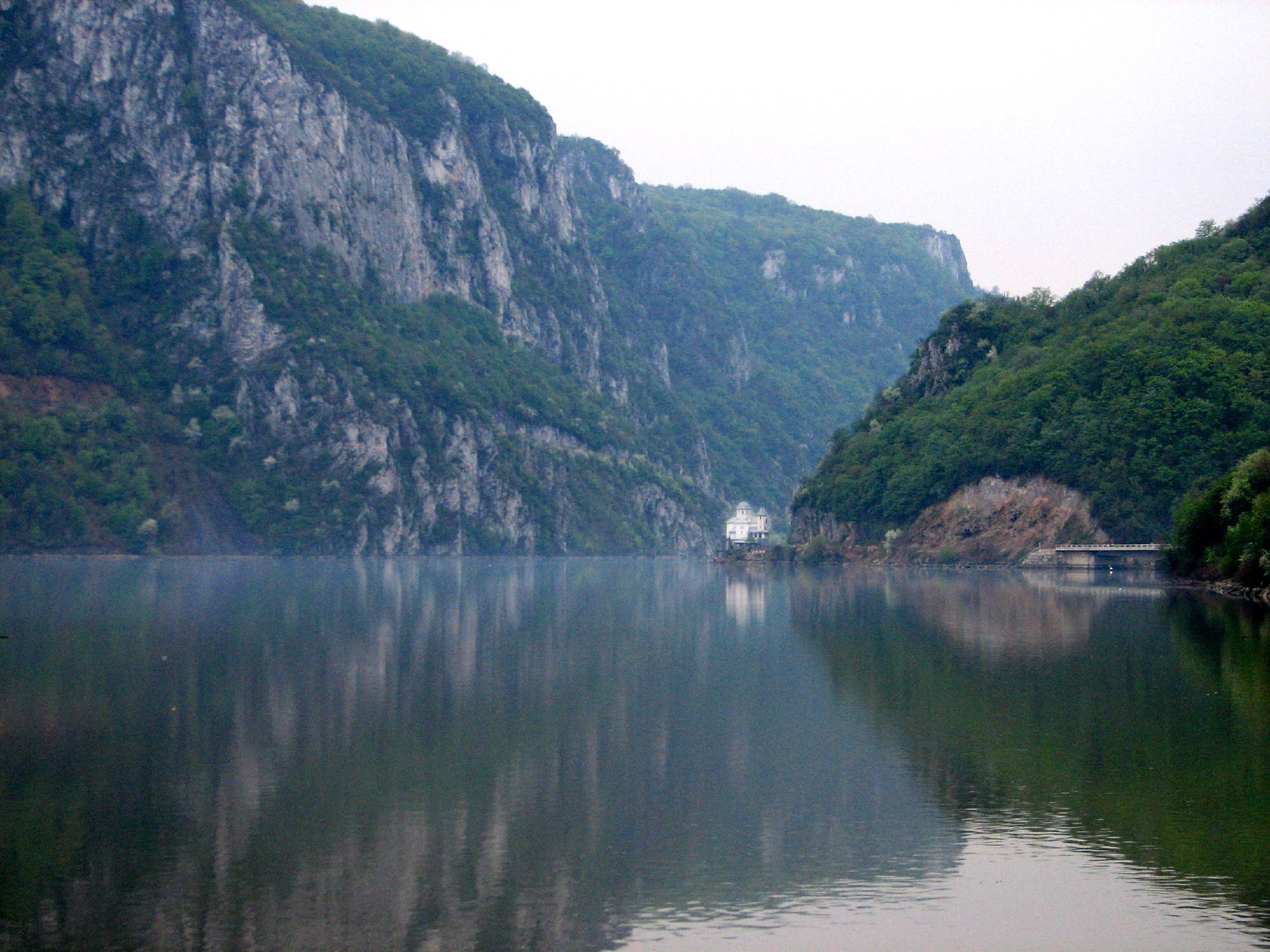

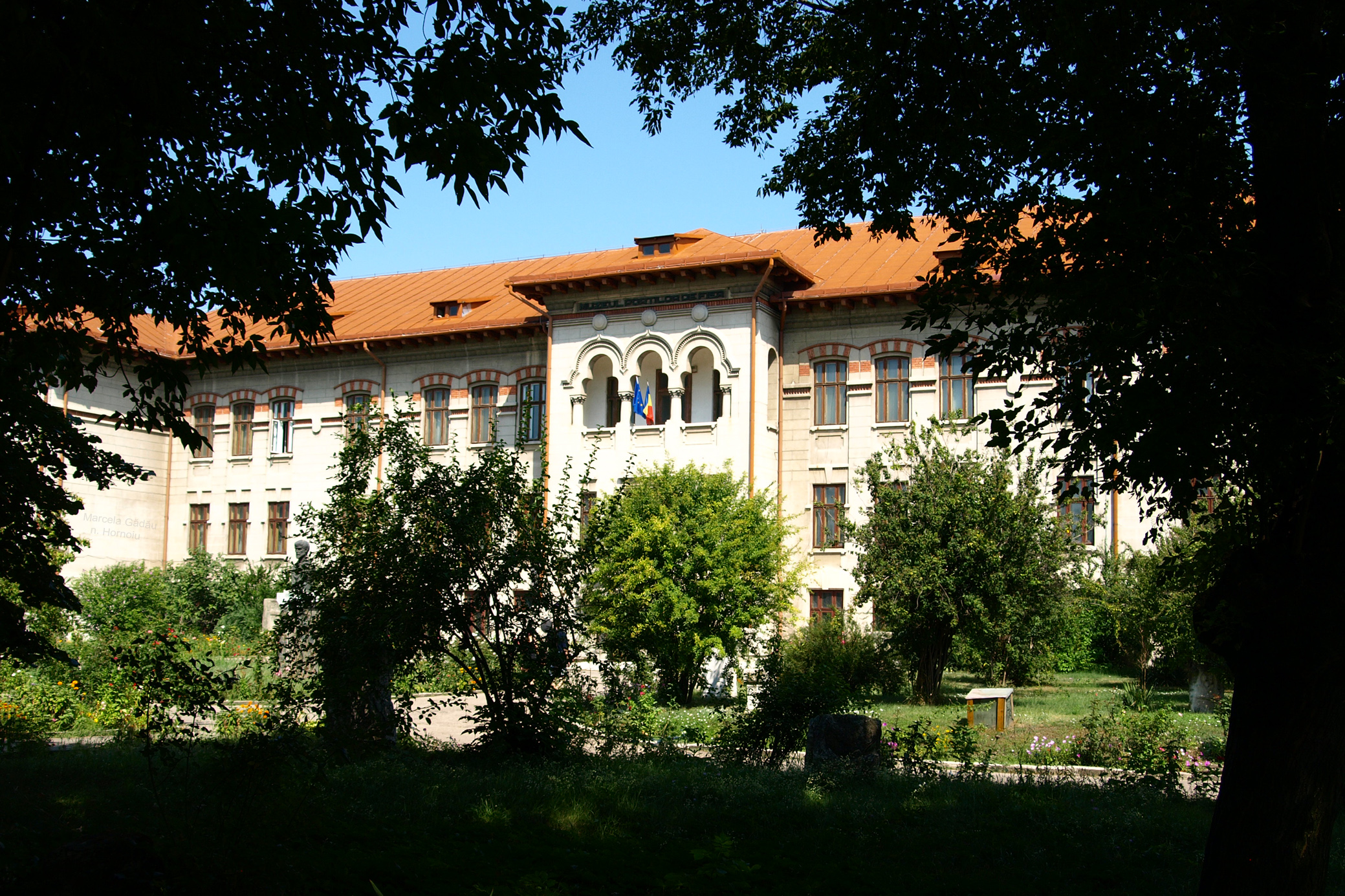
Iron Gates Museum

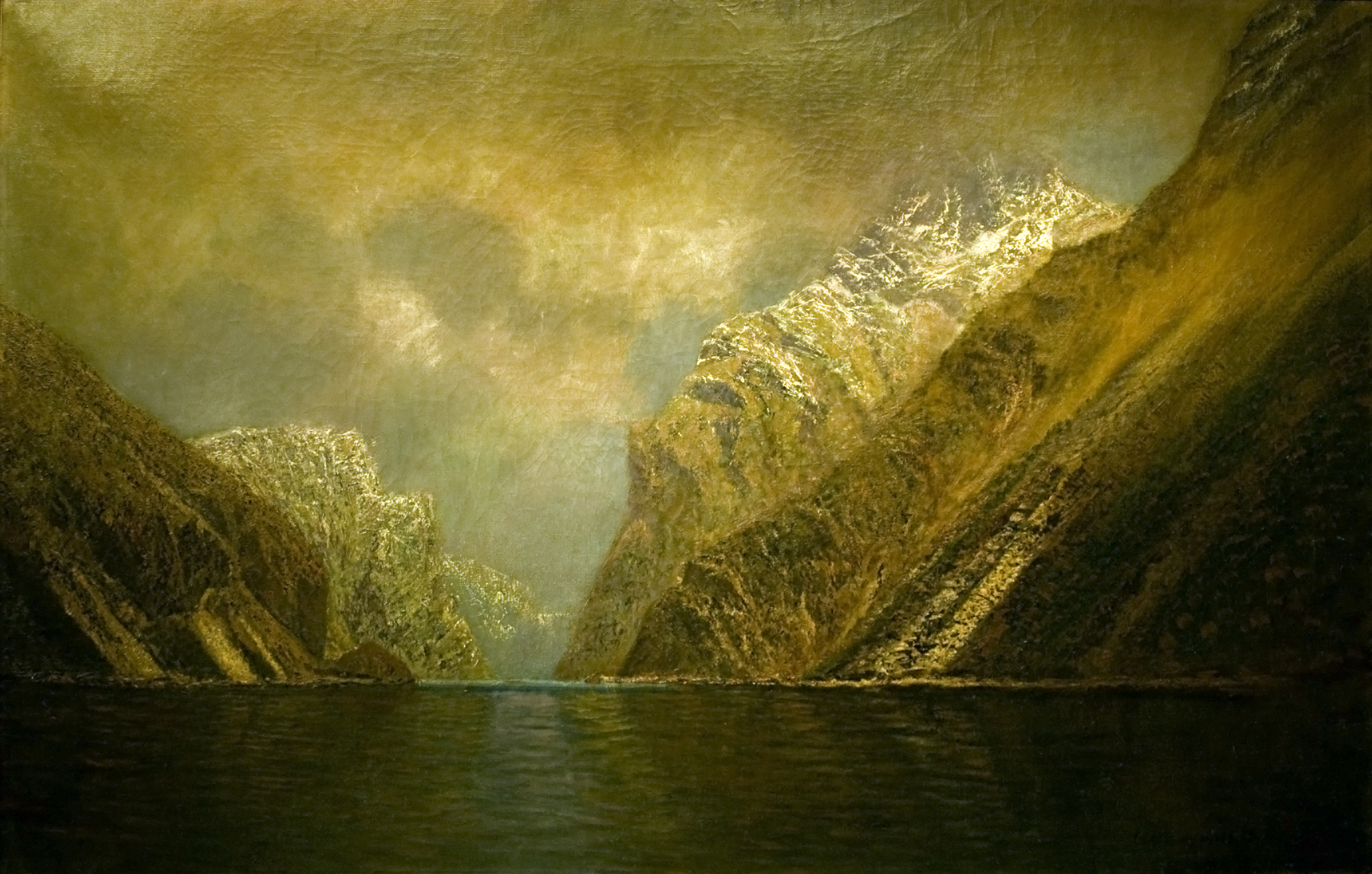
Iron Gate on the Danube (painting by László Mednyánszky in 1890's)

== See also ==
- Three Gorges – similar gorges on the Yangtze River also affected by large dams
- Tourism in Romania
- Seven Wonders of Romania
- Commissions of the Danube River – International river management bodies
- Danube River Conference of 1948 – International diplomatic meeting
- Defile (geography) – Narrow pass or gorge between mountains or hills
- Energy in Romania
