= World War II casualties in Yugoslavia =

The official figure of war-related deaths during World War II in Yugoslavia and the immediate post-war period, provided by the Yugoslav government in 1946, was 1,706,000 deaths. This number was claimed to be exaggerated in later studies, particularly by statistician Bogoljub Kočović, who in 1985 estimated the actual war losses of the pre-war territory of the Kingdom of Yugoslavia at 1,014,000, and demographer Vladimir Žerjavić, whose 1989 estimate was 1,027,000 deaths. Kočović did not separate civilian and military deaths, while Žerjavić estimated that 53% were civilians, and 47% were members of various military forces.

== Total number of deaths ==
The Yugoslav government estimated the number of human losses during World War II in Yugoslavia at 1,706,000. This figure was submitted to the International Reparations Commission in Paris in 1946. The Commission then requested a documented estimate of the number of casualties. The Yugoslav government gave the task of providing a "significant, but scientifically and statistically founded" death toll to a mathematician of the Federal Bureau of Statistics. The results of this research were demographic losses, encompassing deaths during the war, declining birth-rates, and migration, of around 1,700,000. Deputy Prime Minister Edvard Kardelj presented the demographic losses as actual war losses to support Yugoslavia's request for reparations. This number, equalling to 10.8% of its population, stayed the official estimate in Yugoslavia during its existence.

The Yugoslav censuses of war losses, conducted in 1944/1947, 1950 and 1964, did not confirm the claim of 1,706,000 deaths. The 1964 victims census was conducted for the purpose of negotiating war reparations for human losses and damage to infrastructure with West Germany. The census was requested by Germany as its government did not agree with negotiations on the basis of the official Yugoslav estimate at the time. The 1964 census resulted in a death toll of 597,323 for Yugoslavia. The results were declared a secret and were first revealed to the public in 1989. The census committee claimed that the census covered around 56-59%, or 60-65% of deaths. The Yugoslav censuses did not cover the deaths of Axis troops and the victims of Yugoslav Partisans.

In 1954, the United States Census Bureau estimated the war related deaths of Yugoslavia at 1,067,000. Estimates and calculations of the wartime population losses of Yugoslavia from Ivo Lah, a Slovene statistician, Croatian demographers Ivan Klauzer and Vladimir Žerjavić, and Serb statistician Bogoljub Kočović, ranging between 900,000 and 1,150,000, showed that the official Yugoslav government's figure was highly exaggerated. The most detailed estimates are those of Kočović and Žerjavić. The differences between them were very small, the calculated total number of victims for the pre-war territory of the Kingdom of Yugoslavia by Kočović was 1,014,000, and 1,027,000 by Žerjavić. The post-war borders of Yugoslavia included an additional 8,262 square kilometers of territory that was ceded from Italy.

From 2003, the Belgrade Museum of Genocide Victims has conducted a revision of the 1964 victims list, excluding deaths that occurred after 15 May 1945. As of 2019, the identified number of human losses is 657,290. Dragan Cvetković, a historian working at the museum, estimates between 1,042,000–1,092,000 human losses for the territory of the Kingdom of Yugoslavia, and 28,000 for areas ceded after the war to Yugoslavia.

Estimates of wartime losses of Yugoslavia
Source	Kingdom of Yugoslavia	Areas ceded from Italy
Yugoslav government (1946)	1,706,000	
Ivo Lah (1951)	1,000,000	
U.S. Census Bureau (1954)	1,067,000	
Yugoslav census of victims (1964)	580,981	16,342
Bogoljub Kočović (1985)	1,014,000	N/A
Vladimir Žerjavić (1989)	1,027,000	42,000
Dragan Cvetković (2007)	1,042,000–1,092,000	28,000

=== By federal subject and ethnicity ===
Kočović's and Žerjavić's research showed that the highest war losses, compared to the expected population number in 1948, were in Bosnia and Herzegovina, Montenegro, and Croatia. In absolute terms, the highest losses were in Bosnia and Herzegovina, Croatia, and Serbia proper. The 1964 census of victims showed similar proportions.

The highest relative losses among ethnicities were among the Jews and Roma, and in absolute terms among Serbs and Croats. Kočović and Žerjavić differ in some of their categorizations of victims by ethnicity, largely in the case of the Montenegrin losses. According to Žerjavić, it represented around 4% of their expected population, and according to Kočović, more than 10%. Žerjavić said that Kočović took into account a "considerably larger" annual growth rate for Montenegro in the period of 1941–1948, compared to 1921–1931 and the registered annual growth rate in Yugoslavia after 1931.

Actual losses by federal subject and ethnicity, according to Žerjavić
Federal subject
Federal subject	Total	Serbs	Croats	Muslims	Montenegrins	Jews	Others
Bosnia and Herzegovina	316,000	164,000	64,000	75,000	-	9,000	4,000
Croatia	271,000	131,000	106,000	2,000	-	10,000	22,000
Slovenia	33,000	-	-	-	-	-	33,000
Montenegro	37,000	6,000	1,000	4,000	20,000	-	6,000
Macedonia	17,000	6,000	-	4,000	-	-	7,000
Serbia proper	167,000	142,000	-	13,000	-	7,000	5,000
AP Vojvodina	83,000	45,000	6,000	-	-	7,000	25,000
AP Kosovo	23,000	3,000	1,000	2,000	-	-	17,000
Abroad	80,000	33,000	14,000	3,000	-	24,000	6,000
Total	1,027,000	530,000	192,000	103,000	20,000	57,000	125,000

Actual losses by federal subject and ethnicity, according to Kočović
Federal subject
Federal subject	Total	Serbs and Montenegrins	Croats	Muslims	Jews	Others
Bosnia and Herzegovina	382,000	209,000	79,000	75,000	10,000	9,000
Croatia	295,000	125,000	124,000	-	17,000	29,000
Slovenia	35,000	-	-	-	1,000	35,000
Montenegro	50,000	45,000	-	4,000	-	1,000
Macedonia	25,000	7,000	-	1,000	6,000	11,000
Serbia proper	141,000	114,000	1,000	5,000	8,000	13,000
AP Vojvodina	76,000	33,000	3,000	1,000	17,000	22,000
AP Kosovo	10,000	4,000	-	-	1,000	5,000
Total	1,014,000	537,000^{a}	207,000	86,000	60,000	124,000
Out of the total number of Serb and Montenegrin actual losses, 487,000 were Serbs, and 50,000 were Montenegrins

==== Bosnia and Herzegovina ====
Human losses of Bosnia and Herzegovina in World War II and the post-war period

According to Žerjavić
Ethnic group
Ethnic group	Total	In the country	Abroad
Serbs	170,000	164,000	6,000
Muslims	78,000	75,000	3,000
Croats	66,000	64,000	2,000
Jews	10,000	9,000	1,000
Roma	1,000	1,000	-
Germans	1,000	1,000	-
Poles	1,000	1,000	-
Russians	1,000	1,000	-
Total	328,000	316,000	12,000

According to Kočović
Ethnic group
Ethnic group	Abroad and in the country
Serbs and Montenegrins	209,000
Croats	79,000
Muslims	75,000
Jews	10,000
Roma	5,000
Germans	1,000
Czechs and Slovaks	1,000
Poles	1,000
Russians and Ukrainians	1,000
Total	382,000

==== Croatia ====
Human losses of Croatia in World War II and the post-war period

According to Žerjavić
Ethnic group
Ethnic group	Total	In the country	Abroad	Areas ceded from Italy
Serbs	137,000	131,000	6,000	-
Croats	133,000	106,000	12,000	15,000
Italians	16,000	-	-	16,000
Jews	16,000	10,000	6,000	-
Roma	15,000	15,000	-	-
Slovenes	3,000	2,000	-	1,000
Germans	2,000	2,000	-	-
Muslims	2,000	2,000	-	-
Hungarians	1,000	1,000	-	-
Czechs and Slovaks	1,000	1,000	-	-
Others	1,000	1,000	-	-
Total	327,000	271,000	24,000	32,000

According to Kočović
Ethnic group
Ethnic group	Abroad and in the country	Areas ceded from Italy
Serbs and Montenegrins	125,000	N/A
Croats	124,000	N/A
Italians	1,000	N/A
Jews	17,000	N/A
Roma	15,000	N/A
Germans	6,000	N/A
Hungarians	2,000	N/A
Czechs and Slovaks	2,000	N/A
Slovenes	1,000	N/A
Poles	1,000	N/A
Russians and Ukrainians	1,000	N/A
Total	295,000	N/A

=== Relative losses ===
Relative war losses compared to the expected population in 1948

By federal subject
Federal subject
Federal subject	Žerjavić	Kočović
Bosnia and Herzegovina	10.3%	11.8%
Croatia	7.3%	7.3%
Slovenia	3%	2.7%
Montenegro	7.8%	10.2%
Macedonia	1.9%	2%
Serbia proper	4.1%	3.2%
AP Vojvodina	5.1%	4.3%
AP Kosovo	3.1%	1.3%
Total	5.9%	5.9%

By ethnicity, according to Kočović
Ethnicity
Ethnicity	Relative loss
Jews	77.9%
Roma	31.4%
Montenegrins	10.4%
Serbs	6.9%
Muslims	6.8%
Croats	5.4%
Germans	4.8%
Slovenes	2.5%
Albanians	1%
Hungarians	1%
Macedonians	0.9%

By South Slavic ethnic group, according to Kočović
Ethnic group
Ethnic group	Relative loss
Serbs of Croatia	16.3%
Serbs of Bosnia and Herzegovina	14.6%
Serbs and Montenegrins of Montenegro	11.6%
Croats of Bosnia and Herzegovina	11.4%
Serbs of Macedonia	10.9%
Muslims of Bosnia and Herzegovina	7.4%
Muslims of Montenegro	6.0%
Muslims of Serbia proper	5.2%
Serbs of Vojvodina	4.9%
Croats of Croatia	4.2%
Serbs of Serbia proper	2.9%
Slovenes of Slovenia	2.3%
Croats of Vojvodina	2.1%
Serbs of Kosovo	2%
Macedonians of Macedonia	0.8%

=== Victim category ===
Actual losses by federal subject and victim category, according to Žerjavić^{a}
Federal subject
Federal subject	Total	Total fatalities	Yugoslav Partisans	Axis forces
Bosnia and Herzegovina	316,000	174,000	72,000	70,000
Croatia	271,000	153,000	66,000	52,000
Slovenia	33,000	11,000	12,000	10,000
Montenegro	37,000	15,000	15,000	7,000
Macedonia	17,000	2,000	14,000	1,000
Serbia	167,000	92,000	42,000	33,000
AP Vojvodina	83,000	46,000	10,000	27,000
AP Kosovo	23,000	8,000	6,000	9,000
Total	947,000	501,000	237,000	209,000
Losses that occurred abroad are excluded

== Independent State of Croatia ==
=== Civilian ===
Žerjavić's calculation of the civilian deaths in Croatia was 153,000, in Bosnia and Herzegovina 174,000, and in Vojvodina 46,000. The Independent State of Croatia (NDH) included the entire Bosnia and Herzegovina, most of Croatia, and a part of Vojvodina. The rough estimate of the total number of civilian deaths on this territory is 300–330,000. Kočović did not sort out the casualties by category.

Dragan Cvetković of the Belgrade Museum of Genocide Victims estimates that between 499–530,000 civilians lost their lives in the NDH. Among them were 66.5% Serbs, 10.2% Croats, 7.8% Muslims, 5.8% Jews, 4.9% Roma, and 4.9 others and undetermined. The estimate is based on a partially revised victims list from the 1964 Yugoslav census, excluding casualties that occurred after the formal end of the war. The civilian deaths in the NDH make up 73% of all civilian deaths in Yugoslavia.

Civilian deaths in the NDH by ethnicity
Ethnicity	Cvetković		Žerjavić
Ethnicity	Low estimate	High estimate	Žerjavić
Serbs	332,000	352,000	217,000^{a}
Croats	51,000	54,000	70,000^{b}
Muslims	39,000	41,000	39,000^{c}
Jews	29,000	31,000	26,900^{d}
Roma	24,000	26,000	16,000^{e}
Other	6,000	7,000	N/A
Undetermined	18,000	19,000	N/A
Total	499,000	530,000	N/A
Includes 20,000 victims of the German Sajmište camp. 60,000 in Croatia, Bosnia and Herzegovina, and Srijem, and 10,000 abroad. 36,000 in Bosnia and Herzegovina, 1,000 in Croatia, and 2,000 abroad. 19,800 in the country, 7,100 abroad. 15,000 in Croatia and 1,000 in Bosnia and Herzegovina.

Serbs

Kočović calculated the actual losses of Serbs in the NDH, both civilian and military casualties, at 370,000. With a possible error of around 10%, he said that Serb losses cannot be higher than 410,000. According to Žerjavić, 217,000 Serbs in the NDH died as "victims of fascist terror", of whom 93,000 died in camps, prisons and pits. Of that number, Žerjavić estimated that 78,000 were killed by the Ustaše at Jasenovac and in "prisons, pits and other camps", 45,000 were killed by German forces, 15,000 by Italian forces, 34,000 were killed in battles between the Ustaše, the Chetniks, and the Partisans, and 25,000 died of typhoid. 20,000 were killed in the German Sajmište camp.

According to Cvetković, the total Serb civilian deaths were 332–352,000. The Belgrade Museum of Genocide Victims estimates that 101,400–106,700 Serbs died in NDH concentration camps.

Croats and Muslims

According to Žerjavić, 70,000 Croats from the NDH died as "civilians, casualties of direct terror and camps": 33,000 in Croatia, 25,000 in Bosnia and Herzegovina, 2,000 in Srijem, and 10,000 abroad. Out of that number, excluding the casualties from abroad, 18,000 were killed by the Chetniks, 17,000 by NDH armed forces, 14,000 by the Partisans, 7,000 by German forces, and 5,000 by Italian forces. Around 1,000 Croatian Muslims were included in these calculations.

Cvetković estimates that 51-54,000 Croat civilians died during the war in the territory of the NDH. According to the Belgrade Museum of Genocide Victims, 11,900–13,100 Croats died in NDH concentration camps.

The civilian casualties of the Bosnian Muslims were 36,000, based on Žerjavić's research; 20,000 were killed by the Chetniks, 7,000 by the NDH armed forces, 4,000 by the Germans, 3,000 by the Italians, and 2,000 by the Partisans.

Cvetković estimates 39–41,000 Muslim civilian deaths. The Belgrade Museum of Genocide Victims lists 1,600–1,800 Muslims that died in NDH concentration camps.

Actual losses of Croat and Muslim civilians, according to Žerjavić^{a}
Deaths caused by	Bosnian Muslims	Croats and Croatian Muslims
Chetniks	20,000	18,000
NDH armed forces	7,000	17,000
Yugoslav Partisans	2,000	14,000
German forces	4,000	7,000
Italian forces	3,000	5,000
Total	36,000	61,000
Losses that occurred abroad are excluded

Serb "victims of fascist terror", according to Žerjavić
Deaths caused by/location	Serbs
Jasenovac concentration camp	50,000
German forces	45,000
Battles between Ustaše, Chetniks and Partisans	34,000
Prisons, pits and other camps	28,000
Died of typhoid	25,000
Sajmište concentration camp	20,000
Italian forces	15,000
Total	217,000

Jews and Roma

For the Jewish population in the NDH, Žerjavić calculated 19,800 deaths in the country, and 7,100 abroad. Cvetković put the number of Jewish deaths at 29–31,000. The Ustaše were responsible for 74.7% of deaths, the Germans for 24.9, and the Italians for 0.4%.

Žerjavić estimated 16,000 Roma deaths in Croatia and Bosnia and Herzegovina. According to Kočović, the Roma war losses in Croatia were 15,000, and in Bosnia and Herzegovina 5,000.

The Belgrade Museum of Genocide Victims estimates that 22,200–23,800 Roma died in concentration camps of the NDH, out of a total of 24-26,000 Roma civilian casualties, based on Cvetković's research.

=== Military ===
Žerjavić estimated that 99,000 died as members of the NDH armed forces, during and after the war as POWs. Out of that number, 69,000 were Croats, 1,000 were Croatian Muslims, and 29,000 were Bosnian Muslims. He estimated that 50,000 Croats and 11,000 Bosnian Muslims died as members of the Yugoslav Partisans, both in the country and abroad. Regarding Serb military deaths in the NDH, 82,000 died in Yugoslav Partisan units, and 23,000 as "collaborators and quislings".

According to Cvetković, there were 191–206,000 combatant deaths in the NDH. 5–6,000 were members of the Royal Yugoslav Army, 149–157,000 were Yugoslav Partisans, and 37–43,000 were members of other military formations. 101–106,000 Serbs died as Yugoslav Partisans, and 6–8,000 as Chetniks.

== Serbia ==
=== Serbia proper ===
Regarding Serb war losses in Serbia proper, Žerjavić provided the number of 80,000 civilian deaths, or 46,000 in concentration camps, 21,000 killed by German forces, 11,000 by Bulgarian forces, and 2,000 by the Chetniks. A further 39,000 died as members of the Yugoslav Partisans, and 23,000 as Chetniks and collaborators. The Jewish war deaths were 7,000. 13,000 Muslims died as civilians, members of Axis forces, or as Yugoslav Partisans, and 5,000 were Russians, Ukrainians, Germans, and others.

The revised 1964 victims census by the Belgrade Museum of Genocide contains the named list of 55,830 civilians that died in the Territory of the Military Commander in Serbia, which included most of Serbia proper and a part of Vojvodina. Of that number, 44,770 were Serbs, 6,254 were Jews, and 4,806 were other ethnicities or undetermined. Cvetković estimates that the total number of Jewish deaths in this territory was 11,400–11,700.

=== Vojvodina ===
In 2010, the Inter-Academy Commission was set up by the Serbian Academy of Arts and Sciences and Hungarian Academy of Sciences, to establish the number of civilian casualties within the post-war borders of Vojvodina from 1941 to 1948. Based on the published results as of 2015, until the formal end of the Second World War, 60,847 civilians lost their lives. 25,187 died after that date, from 1945–1948, and for 458 civilians the exact date of death was not determined. Of the total number of 86,492 civilians, 51% died in camps, 47% in extrajudicial executions, and 2% were sentenced to death. The highest number of deaths was in 1944, followed by 1942 and 1945. Until May 1945, most civilian deaths were caused by the German forces, followed by the Yugoslav Partisans, the NDH armed forces, and the Hungarian forces. After the end of the war, most civilian casualties were Germans who died in Yugoslav camps. Among the civilian deaths were 36.5% Germans, 31.2% Serbs, 16.9% Jews, 9.1% Hungarians, and 2.2% Croats.

Actual losses of civilians in Vojvodina from 1941–1948, according to the Inter-Academy Commission
Deaths caused by	Total	Germans	Serbs	Jews	Hungarians	Croats	Others
Yugoslav Partisans/OZNA	41,916	31,042	1,294	131	7,038	1,229	1,182
German forces	20,336	160	7,936	11,168	157	120	795
NDH armed forces	12,315	26	10,566	828	35	102	758
Hungarian forces	9,018	27	5,746	2,210	200	264	571
Chetniks	485^{a}	265	98	17	24	54	N/A^{a}
Others/unknown	2,244^{a}	76	1,320	293	412	143	N/A^{a}
Total	86,492	31,596	26,960	14,647	7,866	1,912	3,511
Breakdown for "Others" in those categories was not provided

== Slovene Lands ==
The calculations of war losses for Slovenia by Kočović and Žerjavić are related to the area of the pre-war Drava Banovina only, excluding today's western Slovenia that was then a part of Italy. Žerjavić's calculation of war losses for that territory was 33,000: 32,000 Slovenes and 1,000 Germans. The total losses of Slovenes during and after the war were 42,000 dead, of whom 6,000 died abroad. Of the war losses among Slovenes in the Drava Banovina, 12,000 died as Yugoslav Partisans, 9,000 as Slovene Home Guards and members of the White Guard, and 2,000 that were forcibly mobilized in the German army. 9,000 were civilians. Žerjavić gave a rough estimate for western Slovenia of 10,000 deaths. Kočović provided a similar death toll as Žerjavić for the Drava Banovina of 35,000, of which 30,000 were Slovenes, 3,000 were Germans, 1,000 were Jews, and 1,000 were Roma. He estimated the total losses of Slovenes in Yugoslavia at 32,000.

After these two studies came out, several Slovenian researchers cautioned that the figures given for the Drava Banovina were too low. The Institute of Contemporary History in Ljubljana launched in 1995 an ongoing research on the war losses in Slovene Lands from April 1941 to January 1946. The published data as of 2012 showed that around 97,700 people died in the territory of present-day Slovenia in that time period. This represents a loss of 6.5% of Slovenia's population. The highest losses were in the Province of Ljubljana (9.5% of the population), and the lowest were in the Prekmurje region (1.9%). Of that number, 23,412 were civilians, 33,386 were members of the Yugoslav Partisans, the Liberation Front of the Slovene Nation and other pro-partisan military units, 15,276 were Slovene Home Guards, White Guards and Slovene Chetniks, 12,380 were mobilized in the German, Italian, or Hungarian army, 1,339 were others, while 11,952 are unidentified.

== Migrations from Yugoslavia ==
The demographics losses due to emigration include those that were expelled from Yugoslavia, those that refused to return to the country from camps or from work abroad, and those that fled or emigrated for other reasons, up until 1948. Kočović's total estimate of emigrants was 654,000, while Žerjavić's was 669,000. The largest group in this category are the Germans. Their losses due to emigration were between 400–425,000. Yugoslavia's constitutive nations accounted for 150–155,000 emigrants.

Emigrated from Yugoslavia during and after the war^{a}
Ethnicity
Ethnicity	Kočović	Žerjavić
Germans	396,000	425,000
Italians	4,000	3,000
Serbs	60,000	80,000
Croats	57,000	39,000
Hungarians	33,000	32,000
Muslims	14,000	23,000
Slovenes	12,000	6,000
Jews	8,000	8,000
Macedonians	7,000	3,000
Others	63,000	50,000
Total	654,000	669,000
Data for the borders of the Kingdom of Yugoslavia

== Areas ceded from Italy ==
After the end of the war, the areas of Istria, Slovene Littoral, the cities of Rijeka and Zadar, and several islands were ceded from Italy to Yugoslavia, and its republics of Slovenia and Croatia. For the areas ceded to Croatia, Žerjavić in 1993 published the results of his research which showed that 32,000 people died in that area from 1941–1945. 16,000 were Italians, 15,000 were Croats, and 1,000 were Slovenes. For Istria and the islands of Cres and Lošinj, the war losses included 14,000 Croats, 9,000 Italians, and 1,000 Slovenes. For Zadar, the war losses were 4,000 Italians, largely due to Allied bombing of the city, and for Rijeka, 3,000 Italians and 1,000 Croats. For the Slovene Littoral, he provided a rough death toll of 10,000.

== See also ==
- World War II casualties
- World War II reparations towards Yugoslavia
