= Jugoslavijo =

1974 single by Danilo Živković

- 1974 original release cover

Single by Danilo Živković
- Language: Serbo-Croatian
- B-side: "Moj Dunave, reko duga"; "Radimo složno" (re-release)
- Released: 1974; 15 November 1978 (re-release)
- Genre: Balkan folk
- Length: 3:52
- Label: Jugoton
- Composer: Danilo Živković
- Lyricist: Milutin Popović Zahar

Danilo Živković singles chronology
"Ala brzo prođoše mi dani" / "Šta je s tobom, Radovane" (1973)	"Jugoslavijo" / "Moj Dunave, reko duga" (1974)	"Pokloni mi pletenice" / "Joj selo moje" (1975)

Danilo Živković singles chronology
"Tako ti je to" / "Života nema bez problema" (1978)	"Jugoslavijo" / "Radimo složno" (1978)	"Kočijašu, zaustavi konje vrane" / "Milovane, Milovane" (1979)

Audio 1978
- Danilo Živković - Jugoslavijo on YouTube

"Jugoslavijo" (Serbo-Croatian Cyrillic: Југославијо, lit. 'Oh, Yugoslavia'), commonly known by its incipit "Od Vardara pa do Triglava" (Serbo-Croatian Cyrillic: Од Вардара па до Триглава, lit. 'From Vardar All the Way to Triglav'), is a folk song by Danilo Živković. It was composed by the singer himself, with lyrics written by the Belgrade composer Milutin Popović Zahar, and released as a single in 1974 through Jugoton. The song celebrates the homeland of Yugoslavia, proudly referring to its greatest extents, its rivers, mountains, forests, polja and the sea, its proud people, as well as the struggle, blood and workforce that created it.

== Background ==
It was conceived by Zahar for a contest led by the NIN magazine in the early 1970s in a search for a new song that would replace "Hej, Sloveni" (Serbo-Croatian for 'Hey, Slavs') as the national anthem of the country. Zahar was soon after approached by Živković with a request to write lyrics for a song tentatively named "Makedonijo" (Serbo-Croatian for 'Oh, Macedonia'), set in the traditional Macedonian 7/8 rhythm, initially intended for Aleksandar Sarievski. Zahar and Živković would soon realize Zahar's lyrics fit the metric time of Živković's composition, and the two agreed on merging them together. The song, however, did not end up being sent to the anthem contest because Zahar was not confident enough in his skills as a lyricist, as he was first and foremost a composer, and thought there were more gifted, smarter and more professional people than him when it came to songwriting, and that the responsibility was too great.

== Release and reception ==
The song was offered to Jugoton, the largest Yugoslav record label, and recorded on a 7-inch vinyl single. The first reactions to the song were exceptionally negative; critics panned it as "kitsch" all over the press and the commission for culture of SR Croatia imposed sales taxes on the song for emphasizing obsolete elements of Yugoslav history, namely for observing farmers and shepherds rather than industrial workers. Surrounded by controversy, most radio stations were unwilling to take risks and broadcast the song, with one exception being Radio Šabac, which satisfied requests of its listeners. Živković, who performed the song, later acknowledged that Zahar had not received official permission from the League of Communists of Yugoslavia to record a patriotic song and decided to sue Zahar for jeopardizing his career, leading to the eventual fallout of their friendship. According to Popović, the circumstances took an unexpected turn after a trumpet player from the Belgrade military orchestra who had previously played with the pair, uninformed about the public controversy, performed the song on board the Yugoslav training ship Galeb in front of President Josip Broz Tito. Tito endorsed the song and referred to it as "the true folk anthem", and the public campaigns against the song were immediately reversed. The song challenged unwritten censorship practices against "introducing 'serious subject matter' into cultural products of 'low artistic value'" and paved the way for more patriotic songs in the so-called novokomponovana narodna muzika (Serbo-Croatian for 'newly-composed folk music') genre that was held to be low-quality. High social status of its creators granted more space for such maneuvers.

In 1978, at the 11th World Festival of Youth and Students in Havana, Cuba, the Yugoslav delegation was granted the honour of opening the ceremony. The Belgrade choir Collegium Musicum had chosen "Jugoslavijo" as the introductory song, which was received by the public with applause and calls for a reprise.

Zahar and Živković were for a long time convinced that the song was of quality and confident in popularizing it, so in 1978 Živković went on recording a new version of the song with the Orchestra of Slavomir Kovandžić. Based on suggestions from military musicians, he wrote a melody resembling march rhythms performed in 1979 under the name "Domovino moja mila" (Serbo-Croatian for 'Oh, My Dear Homeland') by the Đerdan Ensemble. Although these versions were fairly popular, the song became a hit across the whole country and abroad after the 1980 arrangement by Zagreb-based ensemble Ladarice published by PGP-RTB. It soon became a part of many repertoires, choirs, ensembles and interpreters of folk music. Although it never fulfilled its original purpose of replacing the national anthem, the song was profoundly received among Yugoslavs, compatriots, and the diaspora and was considered an unofficial second anthem.

== Legacy ==
Since the breakup of Yugoslavia, like all songs celebrating the former country, "Jugoslavijo" remains controversial when played in public. By contrast, the song is well received by Yugo-nostalgics and admirers of Yugoslavia in general, and can be seen performed by folk choirs. The phrase "od Vardara do Triglava" itself remains a popular common metonym in references to Yugoslavia and the modern Yugosphere.

The song has been featured in the 2016 Croatian film ZG80, which is set during the final years of tensions in the former Yugoslavia. It has also been used for the premiere tour for the 2006 comedy-drama The Border Post.

The song "Yugo" from the Slovenian pop-rock group Rock Partyzani mixes a wide range of lyrics from the Yugoslav-era rock songs into one, which starts with and includes the lyrics of "Jugoslavijo".
