= Sip Canal =

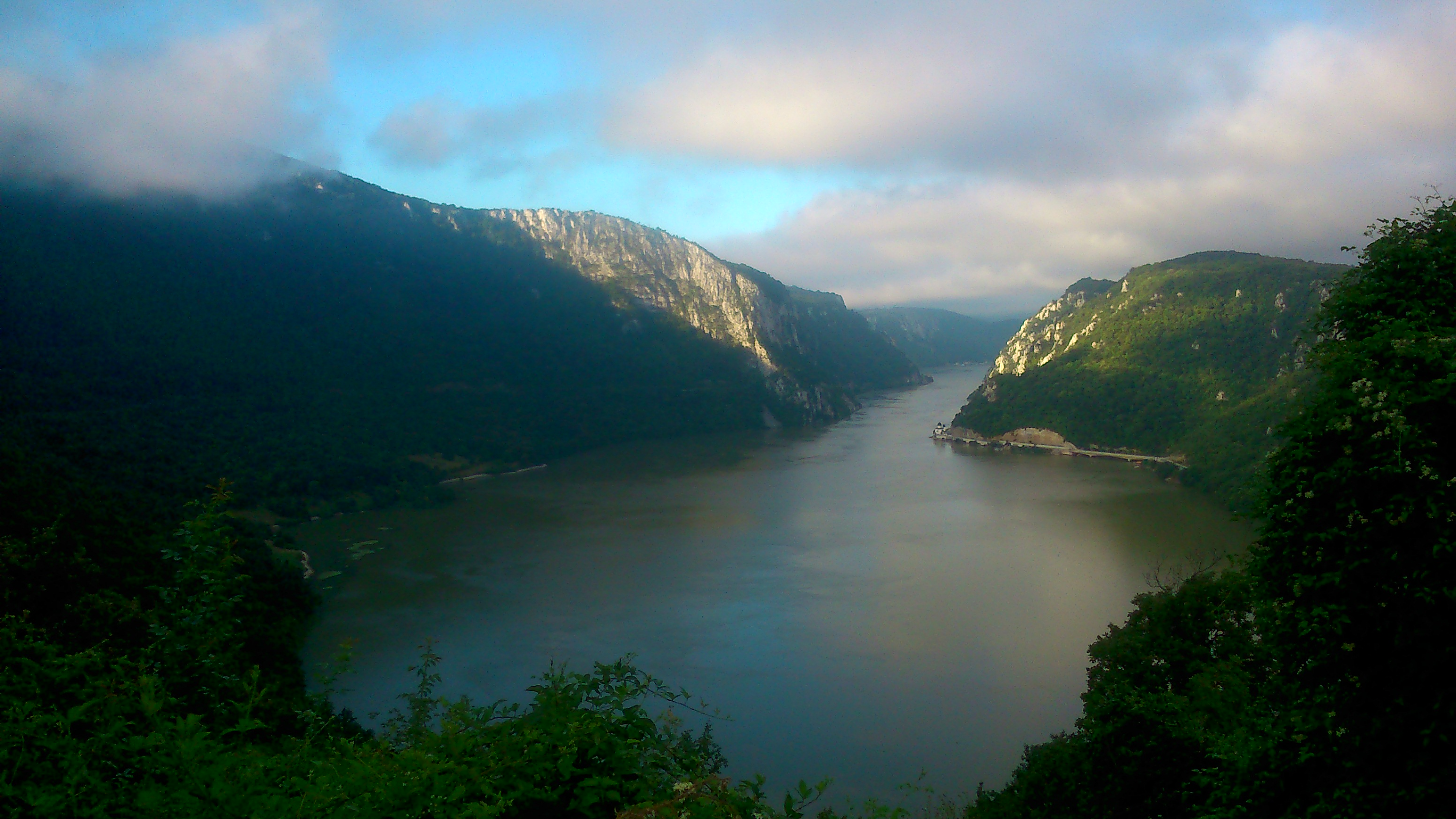
Iron Gates gorge today, flooded by the Đerdap Lake

The Sip Canal (Serbian: Сипски канал / Sipski kanal) was a ship canal on the Danube, in eastern Serbia. It was constructed as part of a massive international effort to make the navigation through the most dangerous sections of the Iron Gates gorge safer and easier. Opened in 1896, with participation of three royal heads of state, the Sip Canal was flooded in 1969 when the artificial Đerdap Lake was formed after the dam of the Iron Gate I Hydroelectric Power Station on the Danube was built. In terms of navigation, it was the most important of all 7 canals cut through the gorge.

== Origin ==
The Iron Gate gorge was notorious for the riverbed boulders and river rapids, which were hard to navigate through even for the most seasoned ferrymen. During the Ottoman rule, the ships were guided through by the local navigators who were familiar with the routes. They were called kalauz (from Turkish kalavuz, meaning guide, travel leader). During the rule of prince Miloš Obrenović, local Serbs gradually took over from the Ottomans. The Serbian navigators were officially appointed by prince Miloš. To alleviate the Ottomans, the prince named Serbian navigators by a Turkish name, dumendžibaša, from dümen (rudder) and baş (head, chief, master). The navigation fee was divided in three parts, among dumendžibaša, loc (river pilots) and the local municipalities. The local navigators were described in the works of Vuk Karadžić and Mateja Nenadović.

At the Congress of Berlin in 1878, Serbia was recognized as a fully independent state, while Austria-Hungary was given a task of constructing the future Sip Canal. The task was then relegated to the Hungarian government. Hungarian government has been drafting the projects already in 1831. Several plans were later made by the Austrio-Hungarian government and the Austro-Ottoman commission, but the Hungarian government formed its own commission for the navigation project which finished its work in 1883.

== Construction ==
Hungarian government enlisted a large number of workers and engaged a numerous and heavy machinery. The construction was a massive enterprise which resulted in construction of several canals:

- Stenka, 1,900 m (6,200 ft) long, with 10 navigational signals (originally, the balloons were used)
- Izlaz-Tahatlija, 2,351 m (7,713 ft), with 7 signals
- Svinița, 1,200 m (3,900 ft), with 4 signals
- Juc, 1,260 m (4,130 ft), with 5 signals
- Mali Đerdap, 1,050 m (3,440 ft), as an extension of the Sip Canal

In total, 15,465 m (50,738 ft) of navigable canals was created. Total length of all canals was 16.9 km (10.5 mi) while 19.2 km (11.9 mi) of embankments were also built. They were flooded when the artificial Lake Đerdap was created (circa 1970).

Works in the gorge section were done by the Hungarian Technical Administration, over the period of 11 years, starting in 1889. The works were divided in two sectors, the upper and the lower Iron Gates. The canals in the upper section, at the town of Orșova (the tripoint between Austria-Hungary, Romania and Serbia at the time) were up to 60 m (197 ft) wide and 2 m (7 ft) deep, at the zero water level in Orșova. In the southern section, the canals were 60 m (197 ft) wide and 3 m (10 ft) deep, except for the Sip Canal, which was wider and deeper.

Construction of the canal began on 17 September 1890. It was cut in the right bank of the Danube and cost 10 million golden dinars at the time. Some 465.000 m^{3} (16,421.3 cu ft) of high quality stone was used. The canal was ceremonially open on 27 September 1896, with cannon salvo. The ceremony was attended by the king Alexander I of Serbia, emperor Franz Joseph I of Austria and king Carol I of Romania.

== Characteristics ==
The Sip Canal had a total length of 2,133 m (6,998 ft), it was 73 m (240 ft) wide and up to 3.9 m (13 ft) deep. At the lowest water level it was still 3 m (9.8 ft) deep, which allowed the navigation of large river ships.

Unlike other canals, which were dug into the rocky riverbed of the Danube, the Sip Canal was cut into the bank. The upstream navigation lasted for 24 minutes, while downstream it took only 3 minutes to pass through the canal.

As the canal was located close to the village of Sip, it was named after it. The village was flooded in 1969 and the new settlement, called Novi Sip ("New Sip") was built instead. It is located 9 km (5.6 mi) northwest from Kladovo.

== History ==
=== Beginning ===
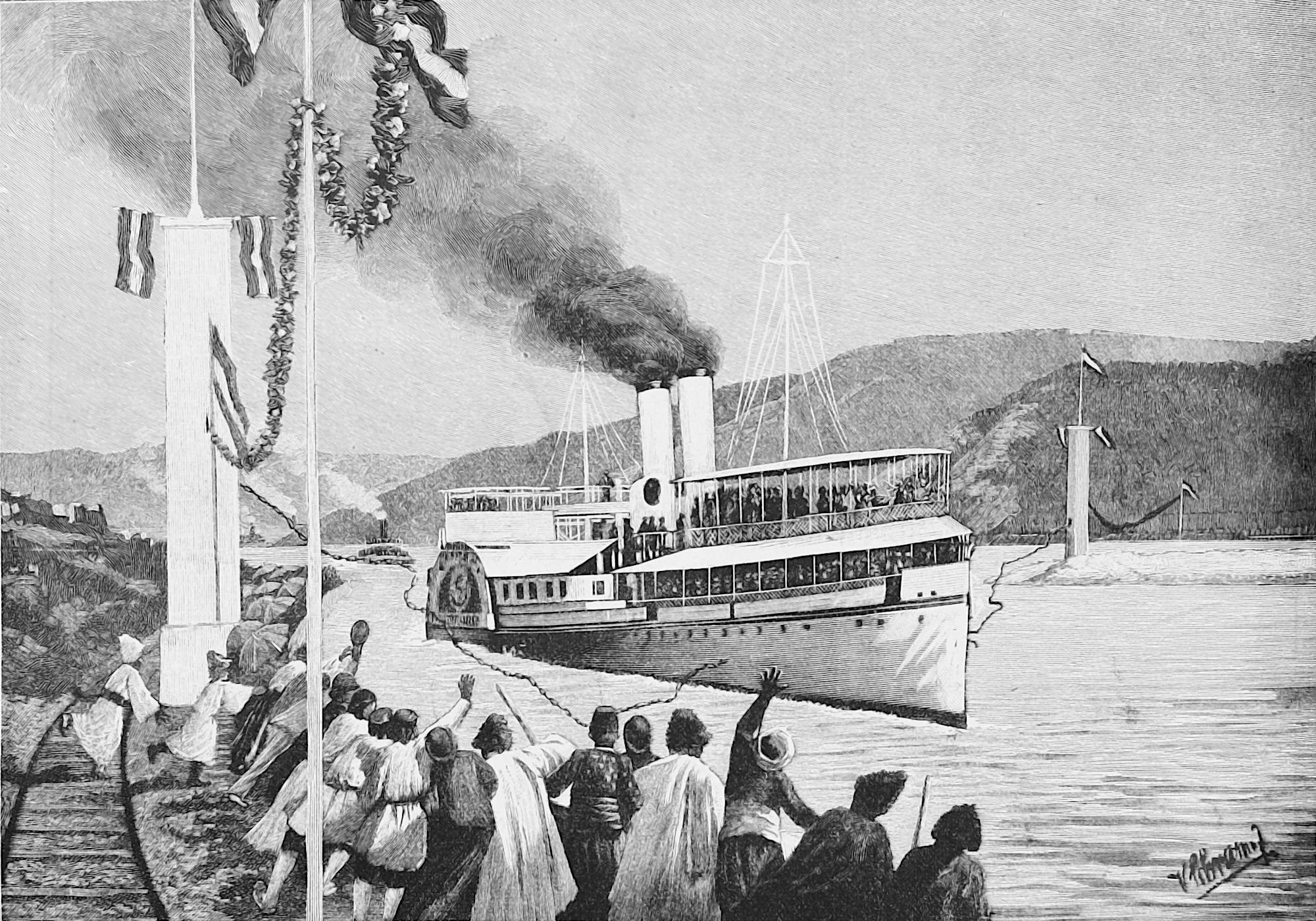
"Franz Joseph I" on the opening day of Sip Canal

The first boat which navigated through the Sip Canal was a 600 hp tugboat. Among the first ships on the opening day was also a steamboat "Franz Joseph I". An elegant, 33 m (108 ft) long ship was built in 1873. A technical marvel of its day, as of 2016 it was still in use. It operated on the Wolfgangsee, at St. Gilgen in Austria.

It soon became evident that the planners miscalculated. The river flow was still fast, actually it increased to 18 km/h (11 mph) and remained an obstacle for the ships navigating upstream. In order to make the navigation easier, a steam-powered tugboat "Vaškap" was employed in 1899 to tug the boats upstream. The "Vaškap" was specifically built by Austria-Hungary for this purpose and the steam engine was winding the cable on the winch.

=== World War I ===
During the World War I, German occupational forces in Serbia constructed a railway next to the canal, on the embankment. It was 1,800 m (5,900 ft) long and the locomotives began tugging the boats instead of the tugboat. Open in 1916, the rail was originally served by three switcher locomotives which used the steel cables for tugging. Each had 400 hp. During their withdrawal in 1918, Germans disabled the railway.

After the war, the canal and the railway were reconstructed, with the rail being extended for additional 400 m (1,300 ft). A total of 11 locomotives was used during the period when the rail was operational. Locomotives were followed by a steam wagon, which had its own operator. The wagon had a steam operated winch on which the ship cables were hooked.

=== World War II ===
After the war, Serbian military devised a backup plan to disable the canal. The tugging locomotives with freight cars were to be crashed into the canal, with cars being filled with cement. Above them, two barges filled with stones were to be demolished in explosion and to fall down on the train compositions, blocking the canal. The barges were to be tugged by the "Vitez" tugboat, from Tekija. Other railway and canal facilities were also planned for demolition. After the Yugoslav coup d'état that toppled the pro-German government on 27 March 1941, the charges for demolition were set, as it was expected war might broke out any moment.

In the World War II the strategic importance of the canal was significant as the connection with the Black Sea, and especially because much of the Romanian oil shipments from Ploiești to Germany passed through it. Thanks to their spy network, Germans found out about the plan for disabling the canal. Main traitors were the mayor of Kladovo, Leonid Čudnovski, and the local restaurant owner whose name is still not known today. The border and the canal were guarded by the 8th Artillery Regiment of the Krajina Division. On 5 April 1941, Čudnovski invited regiment's officers to a drinking party he personally organized for them in the restaurant "Dubrovnik". Among the officers were 2nd lieutenants Bora Todorović, commander of the artillery battery, and Stevan Marković, commander of the anti-aircraft unit.

After the closing time was announced in the restaurant, Čudnovski invited officers to move to his place and continue the party. There, he poured the sleeping drug in their drinks. In the meantime, Germans executed their elaborate and surprise attack. Wearing a typical Serbian folk attire, 54 German commandos crossed the Danube from Romanian side by boats. Members of the special Brandenburgers regiment, they were commanded by colonel Richard Bazing. Majority headed directly to the canal, while a smaller group went to the mayor's house in Kladovo. Germans killed all the officers, even those fully drugged. However, not all of them were asleep, so there was a short shootout, enough to alarm others in town.

Remaining soldiers in two artillery batteries and some gendarmes and infantry, though without commanders, resisted surprisingly strong, especially compared to the later events of the April War, but to no avail. Germans captured the entire security stuff and intact tugging machinery, so they removed the demolition charges. They also cut phone and telegraph lines, but the shootout from Kladovo alarmed other officers. Janko Grgić, the captain of "Vitez", presuming what the shooting means, alarmed the crew, but it took two hours to start and warm all ship engines, and to take the convoy on the river. At the Ada Kaleh island, a German boat opened fire on "Vitez". The fire was reciprocated, but it was just a decoy as the Germans withdrew, making the convoy even more late.

Two helmsmen, Aca Ristić and Krsta Veljošević, managed to steer the barges into the canal and to sink them. However, as the locomotives and freight cars weren't sunk before them, it had no effect, except in the periods of really low water levels when the canal was out of use during the war. Captain Grgić was wounded, but he managed to take "Vitez" out of the hail of German bullets and to sink the tugboat several kilometres downstream, to avoid Germans capturing it. A mock re-staging of the attack by fully uniformed troops in broad daylight was later shot for the German propaganda newsreel about the Balkans campaign, showed on 2 May 1941.

Though the official historic version after the war was that the Invasion of Yugoslavia began in the morning of 6 April 1941, with massive bombing of major cities, especially of Belgrade, the war in Yugoslavia started on the night 5/6 April with the raid on Sip canal.

=== Submerging ===
The profession of loc, a river pilot, survived until the area was flooded. At one point, there were 29 of them in Sip. At the entrance into the gorge, regardless of the flag under which the ship navigates, the captains were handing over the ship commands to the loc. They were so esteemed, that insurance companies were not paying for the damages on the ships which had no loc.

Bad calculations followed the ending of Sip Canal, too. The Sip Locomotive Tugging facilities were flooded by the rising Đerdap Lake in 1969, six months before it was projected. The water rushed one morning into the facility, flooding everything. The entire railway and the last two locomotives are today on the bottom of the lake. The locomotives, JŽ class 30 locomotive 30-031 and 30-034, called berlinke ("she-Berliners"), were built in 1930. They had three-cylinder steam engines and were produced in the A.Borsig factory in Berlin. For a while, some German institutions were interested into dragging the locomotives out of the water, as they are the last remaining locomotives of this design today, and to exhibit them in some of the Berlin's museums.

Today, with the artificial lake and flooded gorge, the navigation through Danube is easy and safe.
