= Vladimir Žerjavić =

Croatian economist and demographer

- Born: 2 August 1912; Croatia-Slavonia, Austria-Hungary (now Croatia)
- Died: 5 September 2001 (aged 89); Zagreb, Croatia
- Education: University of Zagreb
- Occupations: Economist, demographer, U.N. adviser

Vladimir Žerjavić (2 August 1912 – 5 September 2001) was a Croatian economist and demographer who published a series of historical articles and books during the 1980s and 1990s on demographic losses in Yugoslavia during World War II and of Axis forces and civilians in the Bleiburg repatriations shortly after the capitulation of Germany. From 1964 to 1982, he worked as an adviser for industrial development in the United Nations Economic Commission for Africa.

== Early life ==
Žerjavić was born in Križ, Zagreb County and graduated at the Faculty of Economics at the University of Zagreb. He was one of four siblings, having two sisters, Viktorija (1908–1993) and Darinka (1921–2009) and a brother, Slavko. After 1934 he worked in the private sector, and after 1945 in various institutions of SFR Yugoslavia. Between 1958 and 1982 he worked abroad as an industrial consultant. In 1964 he joined the United Nations Economic Commission for Africa and later consulted the governments of various nations.

== Žerjavić's calculations regarding World War II in Yugoslavia ==
In the 1980s Žerjavić conducted a research on demographic losses in Yugoslavia during World War II, at about the same time as Bogoljub Kočović, a Serb statistician. Žerjavić's calculations of total victims in Yugoslavia are based on looking at pre- and post-war censuses. Zerjavić asserted that Yugoslavia lost a total 1,027,000 people in World War II.

Victims by country and nationality
| | Serbs | Montenegrins | Croats | Muslims | Jews | Others | Total |
|---|---|---|---|---|---|---|---|
| Bosnia and Herzegovina | 164,000 | - | 64,000 | 75,000 | 9,000 | 4,000 | 316,000 |
| Montenegro | 6,000 | 20,000 | 1,000 | 4,000 | - | 6,000 | 37,000 |
| Croatia | 131,000 | - | 106,000 | 2,000 | 10,000 | 22,000 | 271,000 |
| Kosovo | 3,000 | - | 1,000 | 2,000 | - | 17,000 | 23,000 |
| Macedonia | 6,000 | - | - | 4,000 | - | 7,000 | 17,000 |
| Slovenia | - | - | - | - | - | 33,000 | 33,000 |
| Serbia | 142,000 | - | - | 13,000 | 7,000 | 5,000 | 167,000 |
| Vojvodina | 45,000 | - | 6,000 | - | 7,000 | 25,000 | 83,000 |
| Abroad | 33,000 | - | 14,000 | 3,000 | 24,000 | 6,000 | 80,000 |
| Total | 530,000 | 20,000 | 192,000 | 103,000 | 57,000 | 125,000 | 1,027,000 |

Victims by nationality comparison
| Nationality | 1964 list | Kočović | Žerjavić |
|---|---|---|---|
| Serbs | 346,740 | 487,000 | 530,000 |
| Croats | 83,257 | 207,000 | 192,000 |
| Slovenes | 42,027 | 32,000 | 42,000 |
| Montenegrins | 16,276 | 50,000 | 20,000 |
| Macedonians | 6,724 | 7,000 | 6,000 |
| Muslims | 32,300 | 86,000 | 103,000 |
| Other Slavs | – | 12,000 | 7,000 |
| Albanians | 3,241 | 6,000 | 18,000 |
| Jews | 45,000 | 60,000 | 57,000 |
| Gypsies | – | 27,000 | 18,000 |
| Germans | – | 26,000 | 28,000 |
| Hungarians | 2,680 | – | – |
| Slovaks | 1,160 | – | – |
| Turks | 686 | – | – |
| Others | – | 14,000 | 6,000 |
| Unknown | 16,202 | – | – |
| Total | 597,323 | 1,014,000 | 1,027,000 |

Of those, the vast majority, 623,000 people, died in the Independent State of Croatia - 295,000 in Croatia itself, and 328,000 in Bosnia and Herzegovina (both part of the Independent State of Croatia and under the Ustaše regime at the time), and another 36,000 from those countries died abroad. According to ethnicity and/or religion as needed, Žerjavić provided the following estimates of victims in the Independent State of Croatia, for both the war and immediate post-war period:

- 322,000 Serbs
- 192,000 Croats
- 77,000 Muslims
- 26,000 Jews
- 16,000 Roma

His claims include 153,000 civilian victims in Croatia and 174,000 in Bosnia and Herzegovina, and of that, 85,000 people from Bosnia and Herzegovina and 48,000 from Croatia died in concentration camps. As for the total casualties in Jasenovac concentration camp, he estimated that 85,000 were killed, of which 45–52,000 were Serbs, 13,000 were Jews, 10,000 were Roma, 10,000 were Croats and 2,000 were Muslims.

With regard to Serbs, Žerjavić's calculation ended with a total of 197,000 Serbian civilian victims within the borders of the Independent State of Croatia: 50,000 at Jasenovac concentration camp, 25,000 of typhoid, 45,000 killed by the Germans, 15,000 killed by Italians, 34,000 civilians killed in battles between Ustaše, Chetniks and Partisans, 28,000 killed in prisons, pits and other camps, etc. Another 125,000 Serbs inside the Independent State of Croatia were killed as combatants, raising the total to 322,000.

Regarding the Yugoslav Partisan pursuit of Nazi collaborators, when soldiers and civilians associated with the NDH and other Axis forces were killed by the Yugoslav Partisans, Žerjavić estimated that around 45–55,000 Croats and Bosniaks, 8-10,000 Slovenes, and around 2,000 Serbs and Montenegrins were killed.

=== Žerjavić's opinions and statements ===
Žerjavić's investigations and statistical analyses, like others including those of Kočović, aim to show that the original number of lives lost on all sides during World War II in Yugoslavia was considerably exaggerated, partly due to the war reparations claims by the Yugoslav government shortly after the war.

An excerpt from Žerjavić's book, Manipulations with WW2 victims in Yugoslavia, reads:

"One should also believe that the Serbs in Croatia, who have lived in these territories for more than four centuries, will realize that they are not endangered in a community with Croats. They especially should not be afraid that any form of genocide could occur, because they themselves know best that during the Second World War a large number of Croats stood at their defense, and that they, along with Serbians, contributed to the National Liberation War, and even prevented a larger number of victims. It should be mentioned that the regular Croatian Army (Domobrani) also helped with their passive role and even by logistic support to the partisan units... [V]engeance for the crimes committed by the Ustaše was executed immediately after the war ... Therefore, enacting vengeance against the Croats, with whom the Serbs in Croatia have peacefully lived for the past 45 years, could not be excused, neither morally nor politically. After the artificially created euphoria is over, and once peace is established, all reasonable and objective Serbs will -- I strongly believe -- realize that their common life with Croats, in a state with a prosperous economic future, is the most acceptable solution for them."

=== Independent verification ===
==== Positive ====
Some international agencies and experts have accepted Žerjavić's (and almost equal data achieved by Serbian statistician Bogoljub Kočović) calculations as the most reliable data on war losses in Yugoslavia during World War II. A U.S. Census report from 1954 states: "Details of the (Yugoslav) 1948 census were kept secret but, in negotiations with Germany, it became apparent that the real figure of the dead was about one million. An American study in 1954 calculated 1,067,000."

Following Tito's death in 1980, the 1948 census results became available for comparison with those of 1931. Allowances had to be made for the birth rates of the different communities and for emigration. Research was pioneered by Professor Kočović, a Serb living in the West, whose findings were published in January 1985. He assessed the number of dead as 1,014,000. Later that year a Serbian Academy of Sciences and Arts Conference heard that the figure was 1,100,000.

Žerjavić's and Kočović's calculations of war losses in Yugoslavia during World War II were accepted by the United States Holocaust Memorial Museum, together with other estimates:

Due to differing views and lack of documentation, estimates for the number of Serbian victims in Croatia range widely, from 25,000 to more than one million. The estimated number of Serbs killed in Jasenovac ranges from 25,000 to 700,000. The most reliable figures place the number of Serbs killed by the Ustaša between 330,000 and 390,000, with 45,000 to 52,000 Serbs murdered in Jasenovac.

Concerning Žerjavić's calculations on the number of casualties linked to the Bleiburg repatriations, historian Ivo Goldstein writes that it is "difficult to speak of the overall number" and that "the only option is to rely on the research by Vladimir Žerjavić, which has up to now shown itself to be the most reliable in overall estimates".

==== Negative ====
Some Serb critics of Žerjavić consider his work to have been politically motivated, with the aim of downplaying Croatian nationalist atrocities during the war, such as at Jasenovac. Critics point out that Serbs in Bosnia and Croatia lived in rural areas and therefore had a much higher growth rate than others. Žerjavić used growth rates for Serbs in Bosnia as 1.1% (as for all nations together), while actual growth rate was 2.4% (1921–31) and 3.5% (1949–53).

Some, like Đorđević, claimed that Serbian losses were in fact 1.6 million, a number which goes in other direction compared to the official estimates that Žerjavić denied. The higher numbers was opposed by Bogoljub Kočović's book, published in 1997, which tries to refute Đorđević's efforts to "reinstate" the "great numbers" victims figures dominant in Communist Yugoslavia.

The Simon Wiesenthal Center and Yad Vashem still use the old estimates given by the Yugoslav authorities. The Simon Wiesenthal Center cites the Yad Vashem document, the Encyclopedia of the Holocaust. In a separate entry on the Ustasha movement in general, however, Yad Vashem cites the extermination of "over 500,000" Serbs in the entire NDH.

Croatian historian Vladimir Geiger posited that individual researchers have raised serious objections to Žerjavić's calculations/estimates of human losses by using standard statistical methods and consolidation of data from various sources, pointing out that such an approach is insufficient and unreliable in determining the number and character of casualties and fatalities, as well as the affiliation of the perpetrators of the crimes.

== Žerjavić's calculations regarding the Bosnian war ==
According to Žerjavić's calculations, there were 215,000 victims in Bosnia-Herzegovina in the Bosnian war of 1992–95, of which 160,000 were Bosniaks, 30,000 Croats and 25,000 Serbs. However, according to newer research done by the International Criminal Tribunal for the former Yugoslavia (ICTY), the number of people killed in the war in Bosnia-Herzegovina was around 102,000: 69.24% (70,625) Bosniaks, 25.35% (25,857) Serbs, and 5.33% (5,437) Croats.
