= Novi Sip =

- Village
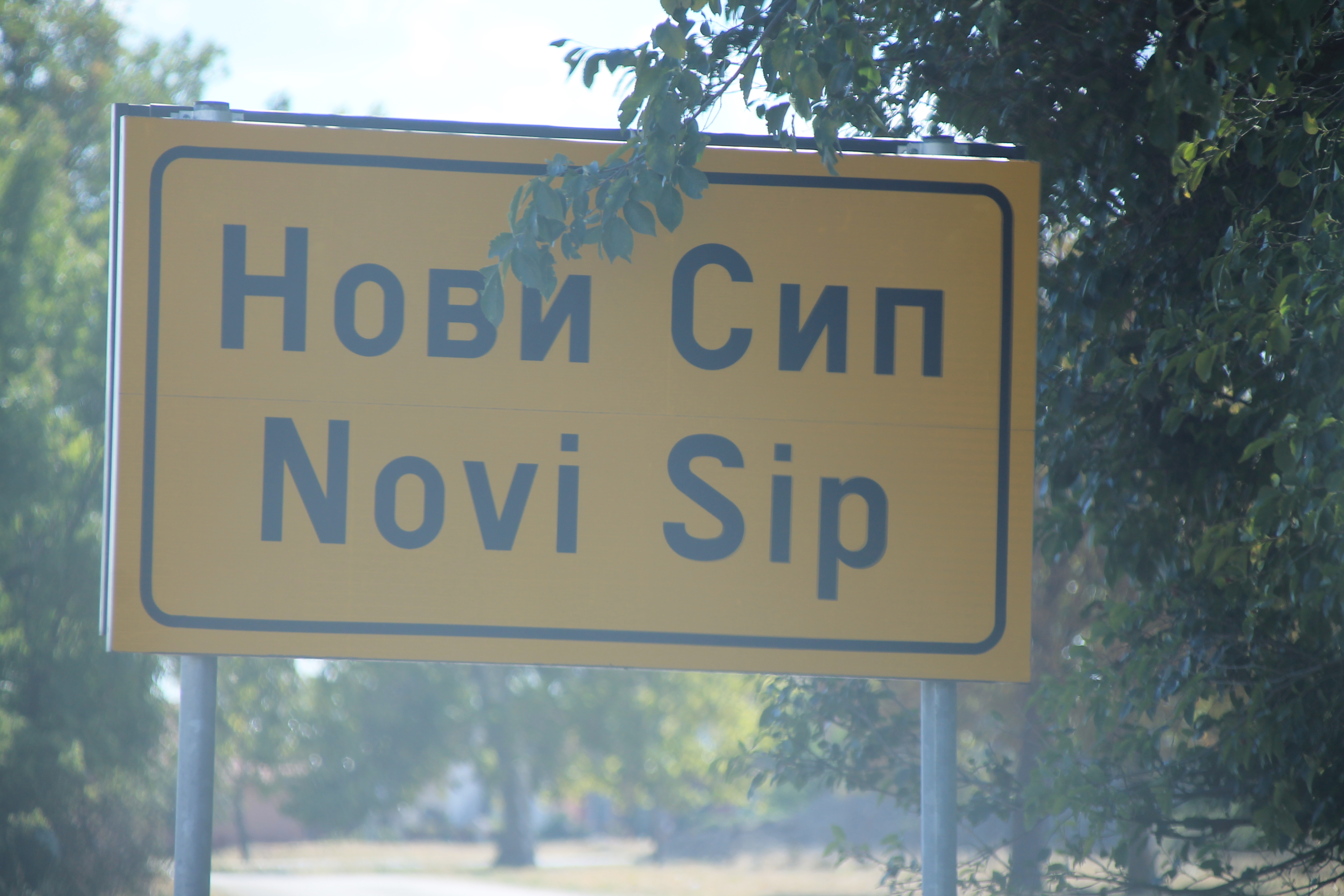

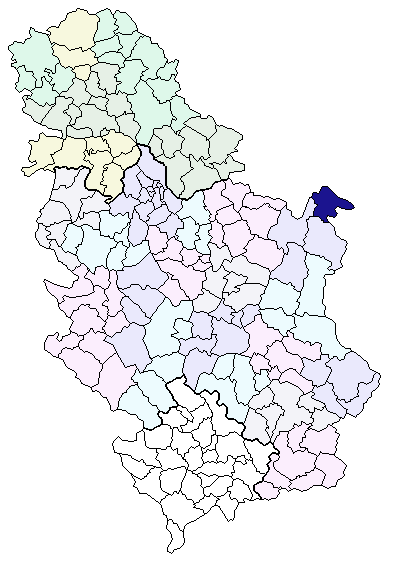
- Location of Kladovo Municipality in Serbia

- Location within Serbia
- Country: Serbia
- District: Bor District
- Municipality: Kladovo

Population (2002)
  - Total: 909
- Time zone: UTC+1 (CET)
  - Summer (DST): UTC+2 (CEST)

Novi Sip is a village in the municipality of Kladovo, Serbia. According to the 2002 census, the village has a population of 909 people.

It is located near the former Sip Canal, on the right bank of the Danube.
