= Bogoljub Kočović =

Serbian jurist & statistician (1920–2013)

- Born: 1920; Sarajevo, Kingdom of Serbs, Croats and Slovenes (now Sarajevo, Bosnia and Herzegovina)
- Died: February 2013 (aged 92–93); France
- Education: Roosevelt University (M.A.), Paris-Sorbonne University (PhD)
- Occupations: Jurist, statistician

Bogoljub Kočović (1920 – February 2013) was a Serbian jurist and statistician. He undertook the first objective examination of the number of people killed during World War Two in Yugoslavia and published his findings in the 1985 book Žrtve drugog svetskog rata u Jugoslaviji (Victims of the Second World War in Yugoslavia).

== Life and career ==
Born in Sarajevo; his father was a Serb, and his mother French. He received a Doctor of Law from the Sorbonne in 1949 and later after working in the U.S., obtained a MA in economics at Roosevelt University in Chicago in 1956. He was a research assistant in the French National Center of Scientific Research (CNRS) from 1947 to 1952. In 1963, he returned to Paris, working as the administrative and financial director for two US firms until his retirement in 1984.

Kočović was one of the co-founders of the Oslobođenje union in Geneva and Paris, a contributor and an editor of Naša reč. He, along with Dr Dragan Pavloviċ, founded the Paris quarterly Dialogue. He was a member of the Association of Serbian Writers and Artists, as well as the Action Committee for the Democratic Alternative.

== Work on World War II casualties in Yugoslavia ==
Kočović's best known work is Žrtve drugog svetskog rata u Jugoslaviji, published in London in 1985 in Serbo-Croatian. He compared the censuses from 1921, 1931 and 1948, and, assuming a possible population growth at 1.1% and emigration in that period, obtained the demographic and what he believed were the actual losses of Yugoslavia during World War II. He clearly stated that his estimates depended on these assumptions, and that if other population growth were assumed, different results would have been obtained. In fact, the population growth for Yugoslavia for period 1921-1931 was 1.55%, and for Bosnia and Herzegovina 2.1%, numbers widely different than he used, and his assumptions, later presumably used (or plagiarised) by Vladimir Žerjavić, were called into serious question. He calculated the actual losses were around 1,014,000 and the demographic losses around 1,925,000. He allowed for a margin of error of 250,000. However, the official number upheld by the Yugoslav communist regime was 1,706,000. Although Kočovic's estimate was rough, his research (along with those of other independent demographers) indicated that the official figure was possibly too high.

Shortly after Kočović's work was published, Vladeta Vučković, a professor of mathematics at the University of South Bend, claimed in a London-based émigré magazine that he had participated in the calculation of the number of victims in Yugoslavia in 1947. According to Vučković, the number of approximately 1,700,000 was actually an estimate of demographic losses, meaning that the number of real losses would have been significantly lower, probably close to Kočović's estimate. Vučković duly provided scientific reasoning to justify estimating the net demographic loss at 1.7 million, but did not intend for his estimate to be used as a calculation of the number of war casualties as such. Still, Yugoslav Foreign Minister Edvard Kardelj took this figure as the real loss, conveying it to the Inter-Allied Reparations Agency in 1947.

Kočović's book was ignored in his homeland until the breakup of Yugoslavia, when it was reprinted in Sarajevo in 1990. During the 1980s, independently from Kočović, Vladimir Žerjavić, a Croatian demographer, used a similar method and obtained similar results. Croatian-American historian Jozo Tomasevich stated that the calculations of both researchers were free of bias and could be accepted as reliable.

Kočović's calculations of World War II victims in Yugoslavia are even lower than those of Žerjavić, however the latter gave a more detailed account of numbers and nationalities of the dead. Kočović confirmed that he considered Žerjavić's work in the field scientifically valid. Kočović wrote a book, Nauka, nacionalizam i propaganda, published in 1997, refuting Serbian statistician Đorđević's efforts to, in Kočović's words, "reinstate [the] great numbers" victims figures which had been dominant in Communist Yugoslavia.

== Books ==
- Žrtve drugog svetskog rata u Jugoslaviji (Casualties of World War II in Yugoslavia; Biddles of Guilford for Veritas Foundation Press, London, 1985)
- Nauka, nacionalizam i propaganda (Science, Nationalism and Propaganda; Paris, 1998)
- Sahrana jednog mita: žrtve Drugog svetskog rata u Jugoslaviji (The Burial of a Myth: Victims of World War II in Yugoslavia; Belgrade, 2005)
