= 1st Army Group (Kingdom of Yugoslavia) =

Royal Yugoslav Army formation

- Country: Yugoslavia
- Branch: Royal Yugoslav Army
- Type: Infantry
- Size: Field army (Note: The Royal Yugoslav Army did not field corps, but their army groups consisted of several armies, which were corps-sized.)
- Engagements: Invasion of Yugoslavia (1941)

Commanders
- Notable commanders: Milorad Petrović

The 1st Army Group was a Royal Yugoslav Army formation mobilised prior to the German-led Axis invasion of Yugoslavia in April 1941 during World War II. It consisted of the 4th Army, 7th Army, and the 1st Cavalry Division, which was the army group reserve. It was responsible for the defence of northwestern Yugoslavia, with the 4th Army defending the eastern sector along the Yugoslav–Hungarian border, and the 7th Army defending the western sector along the borders with Germany and Italy. Like all Yugoslav formations at the time, the 1st Army Group had serious deficiencies in both mobility and firepower as well as internal friction among the different ethnic groups, particularly between Serbs and Croats.

Despite concerns over a possible Axis invasion, orders for the general mobilisation of the Royal Yugoslav Army were not issued by the government until 3 April 1941, not to provoke Germany any further and precipitate war. When the invasion commenced on 6 April, the component formations of 1st Army Group were only partially mobilised, and on the first day the Germans seized bridges over the Drava River in both sectors and several mountain passes in the 7th Army sector. In the 4th Army sector, the formation and expansion of German bridgeheads across the Drava were facilitated by fifth column elements of the Croat fascist and ultranationalist Ustaše. Mutiny by Croat soldiers broke out in all three divisions of the 4th Army in the first few days, causing significant disruption to mobilisation and deployment. The 1st Army Group was also weakened by fifth column activities within its major units when the chief of staff and chief of operations of the headquarters of 1st Army Group aided both Ustaše and Slovene separatists in the 4th and 7th Army sectors respectively. The revolts within the 4th Army were of great concern to the commander of the 7th Army, Diviziski đeneral Dušan Trifunović, but the army group commander, Armijski đeneral Milorad Petrović, did not permit him to withdraw from border areas until the night of 7/8 April, which was followed by the German capture of Maribor as they continued to expand their bridgeheads.

The 4th Army also began to withdraw southwards on 9 April, and on 10 April it quickly ceased to exist as an operational formation in the face of two determined armoured thrusts by the XXXXVI Motorised Corps, one of which captured Zagreb that evening where a newly formed Croatian government hailed the entry of the Germans. Italian offensive operations also began, with thrusts towards Ljubljana and down the Adriatic coast, capturing over 30,000 Yugoslav troops near Delnice. When fifth column elements arrested the staffs of the 1st Army Group, 4th Army and 7th Army on 11 April, the 1st Army Group effectively ceased to exist. On 12 April, a German armoured column linked up with the Italians near the Adriatic coast, encircling the remnants of the withdrawing 7th Army. Remnants of the 4th Army attempted to establish defensive positions in northeastern Bosnia, but were quickly brushed aside by German armour as it drove towards Sarajevo. The Yugoslav Supreme Command unconditionally surrendered on 18 April.

== Background ==
A map showing the location of Yugoslavia in Europe

The Kingdom of Serbs, Croats and Slovenes was created with the merger of Serbia, Montenegro and the South Slav-inhabited areas of Austria-Hungary on 1 December 1918, in the immediate aftermath of World War I. The Army of the Kingdom of Serbs, Croats and Slovenes was established to defend the new state. It was formed around the nucleus of the victorious Royal Serbian Army, as well as armed formations raised in regions formerly controlled by Austria-Hungary. Many former Austro-Hungarian officers and soldiers became members of the new army. From the beginning, much like other aspects of public life in the new kingdom, the army was dominated by ethnic Serbs, who saw it as a means by which to secure Serb political hegemony.

The army's development was hampered by the kingdom's poor economy, and this continued during the 1920s. In 1929, King Alexander changed the name of the country to the Kingdom of Yugoslavia, at which time the army was renamed the Royal Yugoslav Army (Serbo-Croatian Latin: Vojska Kraljevine Jugoslavije, VKJ). The army budget remained tight, and as tensions rose across Europe during the 1930s, it became difficult to secure weapons and munitions from other countries. Consequently, at the time World War II broke out in September 1939, the VKJ had several serious weaknesses, which included reliance on draught animals for transport, and the large size of its formations. Infantry divisions had a wartime strength of 26,000–27,000 men, as compared to contemporary British infantry divisions of half that strength. These characteristics resulted in slow, unwieldy formations, and the inadequate supply of arms and munitions meant that even the very large Yugoslav formations had very limited firepower. Generals with mindsets better suited to the trench warfare of World War I were combined with an army that was neither equipped nor trained to resist the fast-moving combined arms approach used by the Germans in their invasions of Poland and France.

The weaknesses of the VKJ in strategy, structure, equipment, mobility and supply were exacerbated by serious ethnic disunity within Yugoslavia, resulting from two decades of Serb hegemony and the attendant lack of political legitimacy achieved by the central government. Attempts to address the disunity came too late to ensure that the VKJ was a cohesive force. Fifth column activity was also a serious concern, not only from the Croatian fascist Ustaše and the ethnic German minorities but also potentially from the pro-Bulgarian Macedonians and the Albanian population of Kosovo.

== Formation and composition ==
Yugoslav war plans saw the headquarters of the 1st Army Group being raised at the time of mobilisation. It was to be commanded by Armijski đeneral (Note: Equivalent to a U.S. Army lieutenant general.) Milorad Petrović, and was to control the 4th Army, commanded by Armijski đeneral Petar Nedeljković, the 7th Army, commanded by Divizijski đeneral (Note: Equivalent to a U.S. Army major general.) Dušan Trifunović, and the 1st Cavalry Division. The 4th Army was organised and mobilised on a geographic basis from the peacetime 4th Army District. On mobilisation it would consist of three divisions, a brigade-strength infantry detachment, one horsed cavalry regiment and one infantry regiment, and was supported by artillery, anti-aircraft artillery, border guards, and air reconnaissance elements of the Royal Yugoslav Army Air Force (Serbo-Croatian Latin: Vazduhoplovstvo vojske Kraljevine Jugoslavije, VVKJ). The troops of the 4th Army included a high percentage of Croats. The 7th Army did not have a corresponding peacetime army district, and, like the headquarters of the 1st Army Group, was to be formed at the time of mobilisation. It would consist of two divisions, two brigade-strength mountain detachments and a brigade-strength infantry detachment, with field and anti-aircraft artillery support, and also had VVKJ air reconnaissance assets available. The 7th Army included a high proportion of Slovenes, but also some ethnic Germans. The 1st Cavalry Division was a horsed cavalry formation that existed as part of the peacetime army, although significant parts of the peacetime division were earmarked to join other formations when they were mobilised. The 1st Army Group did not control any army group-level support units.

The 1st Army Group was deployed along the border from Senj on the Adriatic coast to Kranj in the Julian Alps then Maribor and down to Virovitica. The major cities of Zagreb and Ljubljana, and the town of Banja Luka are also shown.

== Mobilisation and deployment plan ==
After unrelenting political pressure from Adolf Hitler, Yugoslavia signed the Tripartite Pact on 25 March 1941. On 27 March, a military coup d'état overthrew the government that had signed the pact, and a new government was formed under the commander of the VVKJ, Armijski đeneral Dušan Simović. A general mobilisation was not initiated by the new government until 3 April 1941 not to provoke Germany any further and thus precipitating war. However, on the same day as the coup, Hitler issued Führer Directive 25 that called for Yugoslavia to be treated as a hostile state; on 3 April, Führer Directive 26 was issued, detailing the plan of attack and command structure for the German-led Axis invasion, which was to commence on 6 April.

The deployment plan for 1st Army Group saw the 4th Army deployed in a cordon behind the Drava between Varaždin and Slatina, with formations centred around the towns of Ivanec, Varaždin, Koprivnica and Virovitica. The 7th Army deployment plan saw its formations placed in a cordon along the border region from the Adriatic coast near Senj north to Kranj in the Julian Alps and along the German border to Maribor. It was envisaged that the 1st Cavalry Division would be located in and around Zagreb as the reserve for the 1st Army Group. The Yugoslav historian Velimir Terzić describes the mobilisation of all formations of the 1st Army Group on 6 April as "only partial", and notes that there was a poor response to mobilisation orders for both men and animals. To the right of the 1st Army Group was the 2nd Army of the 2nd Army Group, with the army group boundary running from just east of Slatina through Požega towards Banja Luka. On the left flank of the 1st Army Group, the Adriatic coast was defended by Coastal Defence Command.

== Operations during German invasion ==
The invasion of Yugoslavia, was a German-led attack on the Kingdom of Yugoslavia by the Axis powers which began on 6 April 1941 during World War II. The order for the invasion was put forward in "Führer Directive No. 25", which Adolf Hitler issued on 27 March 1941, following the Yugoslav coup d'état.

The invasion commenced with an overwhelming air attack on Belgrade and facilities of the Royal Yugoslav Air Force (VVKJ) by the Luftwaffe (German Air Force) and attacks by German land forces from southwestern Bulgaria. These attacks were followed by German thrusts from Romania, Hungary and the Ostmark. Italian forces were limited to air and artillery attacks until 11 April, when the Italian army attacked towards Ljubljana (in modern-day Slovenia) and through Istria and Lika and down the Dalmatian coast. On the same day, Hungarian forces entered Yugoslav Bačka and Baranya, but like the Italians they faced practically no resistance. A Yugoslav attack into the northern parts of the Italian protectorate of Albania met with initial success, but was inconsequential due to the collapse of the rest of the Yugoslav forces.

Scholars have proposed several theories for the Royal Yugoslav Army's sudden collapse, including poor training and equipment, generals eager to secure a quick cessation of hostilities, and a sizeable Croatian nationalist fifth column. The invasion ended when an armistice was signed on 17 April 1941, based on the unconditional surrender of the Yugoslav army, which came into effect at noon on 18 April. Yugoslavia was then occupied and partitioned by the Axis powers. Some areas of Yugoslavia were annexed by neighboring Axis countries, some areas remained occupied, and in other areas Axis puppet states such as the Independent State of Croatia (Serbo-Croatian Latin: Nezavisna Država Hrvatska, or NDH) were created during the invasion on 10 April. Along with Italy's stalled invasion of Greece on 28 October 1940, and the German-led invasion of Greece (Operation Marita) and invasion of Crete (Operation Merkur), the invasion of Yugoslavia was part of the German Balkan Campaign (German: Balkanfeldzug).

=== 6–9 April ===
==== 4th Army sector ====
Map showing the locations of bridges within the 4th Army sector that were German objectives. The blue markers are for bridges over the Mura, the red markers are for bridges over the Drava.

German Army headquarters wanted to capture the bridges over the Drava intact, and from 1 April had issued orders to Generaloberst (Note: Equivalent to a U.S. Army general.) Maximilian von Weichs's 2nd Army to conduct preliminary operations aimed at seizing the bridge at Barcs and the railway bridge at Zákány by coup de main. As a result, limited objective attacks were launched along the line of the Drava by the XXXXVI Motorised Corps of General der Panzertruppe (Note: Equivalent to a U.S. Army lieutenant general.) Heinrich von Vietinghoff, despite the fact that they were not expected to launch offensive operations until 10 April.

In the early hours of 6 April 1941, units of the 4th Army were located at their mobilisation centres or were marching toward the Hungarian border. On the extreme left flank of the 4th Army, General der Infanterie (Note: Equivalent to a U.S. Army lieutenant general.) Hans-Wolfgang Reinhard's LI Infantry Corps seized the undamaged bridge over the Mura River at Gornja Radgona, and Yugoslav border troops in the Prekmurje region were attacked by troops advancing across the German border, and began withdrawing south into the Međimurje region. Germans troops also crossed the Hungarian border and attacked border troops at Dolnja Lendava, just north of the Mura. Shortly after this, further attacks were made along the Drava between Ždala and Gotalovo in the area of the 27th Infantry Division Savska (27th ID) with the intention of securing crossings over the river, but they were unsuccessful. LI Infantry Corps cleared most of Prekmurje up to Murska Sobota and Ljutomer during the day, and a bicycle-mounted detachment of Generalmajor (Note: Equivalent to a U.S. Army brigadier general.) Benignus Dippold's 183rd Infantry Division captured Murska Sobota without encountering resistance. During the day, the Luftwaffe (German Air Force) bombed and strafed Yugoslav positions and troops on the march. By the afternoon, German troops had captured Dolnja Lendava, and by the evening it had become clear to the Germans that resistance at the Yugoslav border was weak. XXXXVI Motorised Corps was then ordered to begin seizing bridges over the Mura at Mursko Središće and Letenye, and over the Drava at Zákány and Barcs. These local attacks were sufficient to inflame dissent within the largely Croat 4th Army, who refused to resist Germans they considered their liberators from Serbian oppression during the interwar period.

In the afternoon of 6 April, German aircraft caught the air reconnaissance assets of the 4th Army on the ground at Velika Gorica, destroying most of them. The continuing mobilisation and concentration of the 4th Army was hampered by escalating fifth column activities and propaganda fomented by the Ustaše. Some units stopped mobilising, or began returning to their mobilisation centres from their concentration areas. During the day, Yugoslav sabotage units attempted to destroy bridges over the Mura at Letenye, Mursko Središće and Kotoriba, and over the Drava at Zákány. These attempts were only partially successful, due to the influence of Ustaše propaganda and the countermanding of demolition orders by the chief of staff of the 27th ID. The Yugoslav radio network in the 4th Army area was sabotaged by the Ustaše on 6 April, and radio communications within the 4th Army remained poor throughout the fighting.

===== Zákány bridgehead =====
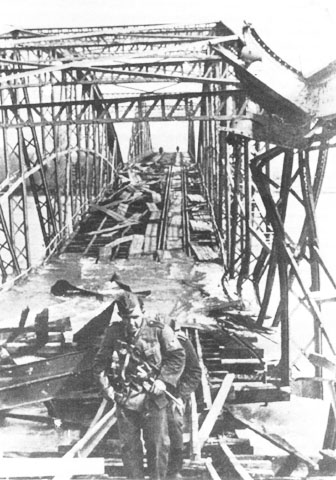
A damaged bridge over the Drava with a German soldier in the foreground

On 7 April, elements of XXXXVI Motorised Corps crossed the Drava at Zákány and attacked towards Koprivnica. Available troops of the 27th ID took up defensive positions to stop this German penetration and Petrović ordered Nedeljković to mount a counter-attack against the bridgehead. By nightfall the counter-attack had not materialised, the defenders had withdrawn to Koprivnica, and Petrović had ordered Nedeljković to counter-attack on the following morning. Also on 7 April, the few remaining reconnaissance aircraft of the 4th Army mounted attacks on a bridge over the Drava at Zákány. On 8 April, the XXXXVI Motorised Corps continued with its limited objective attacks to expand its bridgehead at Zákány.

On the morning of 8 April, the 27th ID was deployed around Koprivnica with some army-level artillery and cavalry support and a cavalry regiment detached from the 1st Cavalry Division. The counter-attack was eventually launched in the afternoon, but was abortive, with only the cavalry units maintaining contact with the Germans. The cavalry held the line throughout the night of 8/9 April, despite heavy German artillery fire. Significant Ustaše-influenced desertions occurred during the day. On 9 April, the XXXXVI Motorised Corps completed its preparations for full-scale offensive action by further expanding its bridgehead at Zákány. The cavalry units continued to fight the Germans, but the left sector of the 27th ID front began to crumble. There was a deal of discussion between commanders from regimental level up to Petrović about discharging the Croat troops and withdrawing to a line south of the Sava River, but despite orders to the contrary, some commanders began to discharge some or all of their personnel, and most troops began to retreat before the German advances. Others received false messages directing them to withdraw. In the afternoon, even the hard-pressed cavalry units began to withdraw, and the Germans captured Koprivnica without resistance. The German capture of the town was made easier due to revolts by Croat troops against Serb officers in the 27th ID.

===== Mura bridgeheads =====
Early on 7 April, reconnaissance units of the XXXXVI Motorised Corps crossed the Mura at Letenye and Mursko Središće and captured Čakovec. Ustaše propaganda led the bulk of two regiments from the 42nd Infantry Division Murska (42nd ID) to revolt; only two battalions deployed to their allocated positions. In the face of this German advance, Yugoslav border troops withdrew towards the Drava. The following day, in the areas of the 42nd ID and Detachment Ormozki on the left flank of the 4th Army, the Germans cleared the territory north of the Drava, and border guard units were withdrawn south of the river. On this day, the 39th Infantry Regiment was transferred to the 42nd ID from the Detachment Ormozki, and the 36th Infantry Regiment of the former joined the 27th ID. The Mura sector was quiet on 9 April. The 42nd ID took the 39th Infantry Regiment under command, but another of its infantry regiments and the border guards in the divisional sector began to disintegrate due to desertions. With the deteriorating situation on the right flank of the 42nd ID, the 4th Army headquarters ordered it and Detachment Ormozki to withdraw from the Drava to behind the Bednja River conforming with the line being held by the 27th ID on its immediate right flank.

===== Barcs bridgehead and the Bjelovar rebellion =====
In the early evening of 7 April, German units in regimental strength began to cross the Drava near Barcs and established a second bridgehead in the sector of the 40th Infantry Division Slavonska (40th ID). Affected by propaganda from the Ustaše, the border troops abandoned their positions and withdrew to Virovitica. Fifth column activities within units of the 4th Army were fomented by the Ustaše, which facilitated German establishment of the bridgehead at Barcs, and resulted in a number of significant revolts within units. The 108th Infantry Regiment of the 40th ID, which had mobilised in Bjelovar, was marching towards Virovitica to take up positions. On the night of 7/8 April, the Croats of the 108th Regiment revolted, arrested their Serb officers, non-commissioned officers and soldiers. The regiment then marched back towards Bjelovar. The revolt of the 108th Regiment meant that the entire frontage of the division had to be covered by a single regiment. During the night, patrols were sent towards the German bridgehead, but Ustaše sympathisers misled them into believing the Germans were already across the Drava at Barcs in strength. The Germans were subsequently able to consolidate their bridgehead at Barcs overnight. By late evening on 7 April, Petrović's reports to the Yugoslav Supreme Command noted that the 4th Army was exhausted and its morale had been degraded significantly, and that Nedeljković concurred with his commander's assessment.

Map showing the location of rebel-controlled Bjelovar, and Koprivnica, which fell to the Germans on 9 April

On 8 April, the German XXXXVI Motorised Corps continued with its limited objective attacks to expand the Barcs bridgehead. A German regiment broke through the border troops in the sector of the 40th ID, and approached Virovitica. At this point, the entire divisional sector was defended by the divisional cavalry squadron, which had been transported there in requisitioned cars due to the lack of horses. Two understrength and wavering battalions arrived at Pčelić, 15 kilometres (9.3 mi) southwest of Virovitica. By noon, the rebels of the 108th Infantry Regiment were approaching Bjelovar, where they were joined by elements of the 42nd Infantry Regiment and other units of the 40th ID. When Nedeljković became aware of their approach, he ordered the local gendarmerie commander to maintain order, but was advised this would not be possible, as local conscripts would not report for duty. The headquarters of the 4th Army reported the presence of the rebelling units to Headquarters 1st Army Group, and it was suggested that the VVKJ could bomb them. The 8th Bomber Regiment at Rovine was even warned to carry out a bombing mission against the rebels, but the idea was subsequently abandoned. Instead, it was decided to request that the leader of the Croatian Peasant Party, Vladko Maček, intervene with the rebels.

On that day, Josip Broz Tito and the Central Committee of the Communist Party of Yugoslavia, then located in Zagreb, along with the Central Committee of the Communist Party of Croatia, sent a delegation to the headquarters of the 4th Army urging them to issue arms to workers to help defend Zagreb. Pavle Gregorić, who was a member of both Central Committees, went to 4th Army headquarters twice, and was able to speak briefly with Nedeljković, but could not convince him to do so. On that same day, Maček, who had returned to Zagreb after briefly joining Simović's post-coup d'état government, agreed to send an emissary to the 108th Infantry Regiment urging them to obey their officers, but they did not respond to his appeal.

Later in the day, two trucks of rebels arrived at 4th Army headquarters in Bjelovar with the intention of killing the staff. The headquarters guard force prevented this, but the operations staff immediately withdrew from Bjelovar to Popovača. After the mutinous troops issued several unanswered ultimatums, around 8,000 of them attacked Bjelovar, assisted by fifth-columnists within the city. The city then surrendered, and many Yugoslav officers and soldiers were captured by the rebels. When Nedeljković heard of the fall of the city, he called the Mayor of Bjelovar, Julije Makanec and threatened to bomb the city if the prisoners were not immediately released. Detained officers from 4th Army headquarters and the 108th Infantry Regiment were then sent to Zagreb. About 16:00, Nedeljković informed the Ban of Croatia, Ivan Šubašić of the revolt, but Šubašić was powerless to influence events. About 18:00, Makanec proclaimed that Bjelovar was part of an independent Croatian state.

On the morning of 9 April, the German bridgehead at Barcs had expanded to Lukač, 7 kilometres (4.3 mi) north of Virovitica. Following up the withdrawal of the divisional cavalry squadron, the Germans seized Suho Polje, west of Virovitica, cutting the main road to Slatina, and the rebel Croat troops at Bjelovar made contact with them. By 11:00, the 40th ID front line consisted of a single regiment with some cavalry support. The 89th Infantry Regiment, marching from its concentration area in Sisak, arrived at divisional headquarters at Pivnica Slavonska, to replace the 43rd Infantry Regiment, which had been transferred to the 17th Infantry Division Vrbaska (17th ID) of the right flanking 2nd Army, which belonged to the 2nd Army Group.

Other reinforcements included elements of the 4th Army anti-aircraft units sent from Lipik, but the divisional artillery regiment had not completed mobilisation. The rebels in Bjelovar issued false orders to one of the forward battalions of the 40th ID, directing it to fall back to Bjelovar. At 11:15, Nedeljković arrived at divisional headquarters and shortly afterwards ordered the division to launch a counter-attack on the German bridgehead at Barcs at dawn the following day. Nedeljković also visited the commander of the 17th ID on the right flank of the 4th Army, to arrange support from that division during the pending attack. However, because the majority of that division's troops had yet to arrive from Bosnia, all it was able to do was advance its left flank west of Slatina. The 40th ID spent the remainder of the day preparing for the counter-attack, but was hindered by German artillery and air attacks. In an indication of the state of the division, during a visit to the front line, the commander and chief of staff of 40th ID were fired at by their own troops. On the night of 9/10 April, those Croats that had remained with their units began to desert or turn on their commanders.

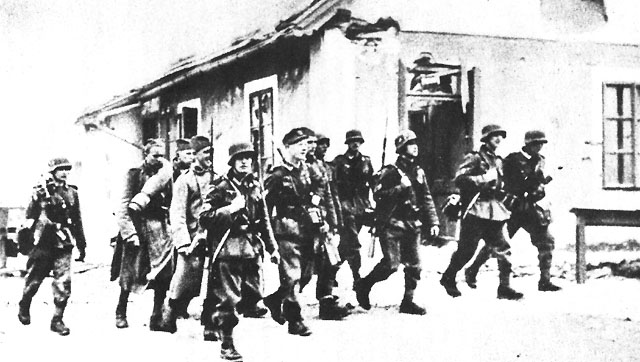
A German patrol returning from a cross-border raid, April 1941

==== 7th Army sector ====
The largely mountainous border between Germany and Yugoslavia was unsuitable for motorised operations. Due to the short notice of the invasion, the elements of the invading 2nd Army that would make up XXXXIX Mountain Corps and LI Infantry Corps had to be assembled from France, Germany and the German puppet Slovak Republic, and nearly all encountered difficulties in reaching their assembly areas. In the interim, the Germans formed a special force under the code name Feuerzauber (Magic Fire). This force was initially intended to merely reinforce the 538th Frontier Guard Division, who were manning the border. On the evening of 5 April, a particularly aggressive Feuerzauber commander led his Kampfgruppe Palten across the Mura from Spielfeld and, having secured the bridge, began attacking bunkers and other Yugoslav positions on the high ground, and sent patrols deep into the Yugoslav border fortification system. Due to a lack of Yugoslav counter-attacks, many of these positions remained in German hands into 6 April. On the morning of 6 April, German aircraft conducted surprise attacks on Yugoslav airfields in the 7th Army area, including Ljubljana and Cerklje, where the 7th Army air reconnaissance assets were based.

Map showing the initial objectives of XXXXIX Mountain Corps (Dravograd) and LI Infantry Corps (Maribor)

The German LI Infantry Corps was tasked with attacking towards Maribor then driving towards Zagreb, while the XXXXIX Mountain Corps of General der Infanterie Ludwig Kübler was to capture Dravograd then force a crossing on the Sava. On the first day of the invasion, LI Infantry Corps captured the Mura bridges at Mureck and Radkersburg (opposite Gornja Radgona) undamaged. In the sector of the 38th Infantry Division Dravska (38th ID), one German column pushed towards Maribor from Mureck, and the other pushed on from Gornja Radgona through Lenart towards Ptuj. Some time later, other elements of LI Infantry Corps attacked the area between Sveti Duh and Dravograd. Border troops met these attacks with fierce resistance, but were forced to withdraw due to the German pressure. The 183rd Infantry Division captured 300 prisoners. A bicycle-mounted detachment of the 183rd Infantry Division reached the extreme right flank of the 7th Army at Murska Sobota without striking any resistance. Generalmajor Rudolf Sintzenich's 132nd Infantry Division also pushed south along the Sejanski valley towards Savci.

Late that day, mountain pioneers destroyed some isolated Yugoslav bunkers in the area penetrated by Kampfgruppe Palten, and German aircraft again attacked the 7th Army's air reconnaissance assets on the ground at Cerklje, destroying most of them at the second attempt. This was followed by Regia Aeronautica (Italian Air Force) air attacks on 7th Army troop concentrations. The VVKJ was unable to interdict the Axis air attacks because their fighters were based too far away. After having been grounded for most of the day by poor weather, in the afternoon the Yugoslav bombers flew missions against airfields and railway stations across the German frontier. By the close of 6 April, the 7th Army was still largely mobilising and concentrating, and fifth column actions meant that nearly all the fighting was conducted by border troops. The 38th ID was deployed along the southern bank of the Drava around Ptuj and Maribor, and a reinforced infantry regiment was approaching Dravograd from the west. German and Italian air attacks interfered with the deployment of troops and command was hampered by reliance on civilian telegraph and telephone services. LI Infantry Corps had occupied Gornja Radgona, Murska Sobota and Radenci, and had crossed the Drava near Sveti Duh. The XXXXIX Mountain Corps captured border crossings on the approaches to Dravograd, but were held up by border troops in mountain passes located further west.

During 6 April, the Ban (governor) of the Drava Banovina, Marko Natlačen met with representatives of the major Slovene political parties, and created the National Council of Slovenia, whose aim was to establish a Slovenia independent of Yugoslavia. When he heard the news of fifth column-led revolts within the flanking 4th Army, Trifunović was alarmed, and proposed withdrawal from the border areas, but this was rejected by Petrović. The front along the border with Italy was relatively quiet, with only patrol clashes occurring, some sporadic artillery bombardments of border fortifications, and an unsuccessful raid by the Italians on Mount Blegoš.

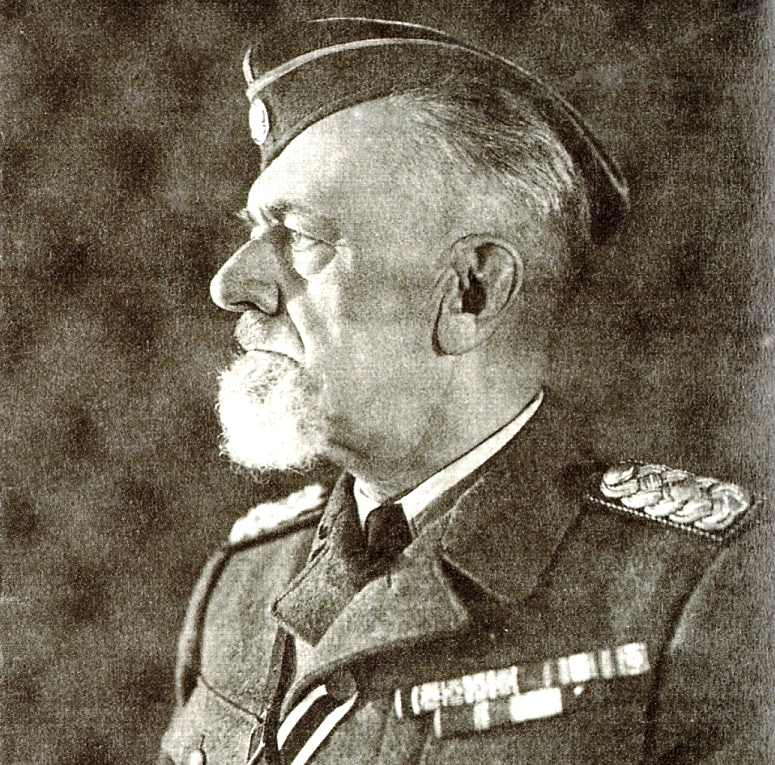
The chief of staff of Headquarters 1st Army Group, Armijski đeneral Leon Rupnik

Over the next three days, the LI Infantry Corps held the lead elements of its two divisions back, to some extent, while the rest of each division detrained in Graz and made their way to the border. Despite this, German forces along the 7th Army front continued to push towards Ptuj, Maribor and Dravograd on 7 April, against significant resistance from border troops. The German thrusts towards Ptuj and Maribor broke through the Yugoslav defensive line, but those advancing towards Dravograd were held up by border troops and a battalion of the 38th ID. Along the Italian border there were only skirmishes caused by Italian reconnaissance-in-force to a depth of 3 km (1.9 mi). The Yugoslav Supreme Command ordered Petrović to use Mountain Detachment Rišnajaski to capture Fiume, across the Rječina River from Sušak, but the order was soon rescinded due to the deteriorating situation in the flanking 4th Army.

In the afternoon of 7 April, Trifunović again pressed Petrović to order a withdrawal from the border. Petrović accepted that this might become necessary if the situation on the immediate right flank of the 7th Army deteriorated further, but the idea was opposed by the Slovene chief of staff of the headquarters of the 1st Army Group, Armijski đeneral Leon Rupnik, who wryly suggested that Trifunović, a Serb, should personally lead night attacks to push the Germans back. At 19:30, the Yugoslav Supreme Command advised Petrović that he had approval to withdraw endangered units on the right wing of the 7th Army. Morale in the 7th Army had started to decline due to fifth column elements encouraging soldiers to stop resisting the enemy.

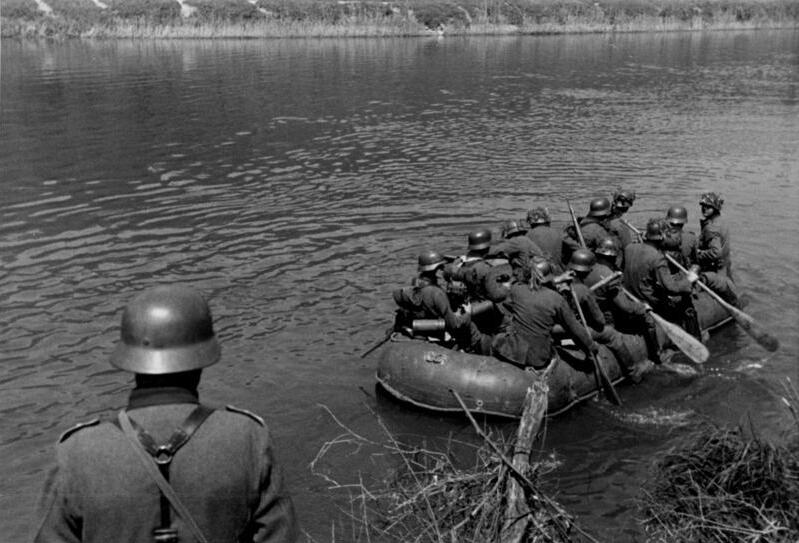
German soldiers crossing a river using an inflatable boat, similar to those used by Kampfgruppe Palten to cross the Pesnica River

As a result of the revolts in the 4th Army, on the night of 7/8 April, Petrović ordered the 7th Army to begin to withdraw, first to a line through the Dravinja River, Zidani Most bridge and the right bank of the Krka River. This was subsequently moved back to the line of the Kupa River. This ended the successful defence of the 38th ID along the line of the Drava, and meant their withdrawal from Maribor. On 8 April, disregarding orders from above, Palten led his kampfgruppe south towards Maribor, and crossed the Pesnica River in inflatable boats, leaving his unit vehicles behind. In the evening, Palten and his force entered Maribor unopposed, taking 100 prisoners. For disregarding orders, Palten and his kampfgruppe were ordered to return to Spielfeld, and spent the rest of the invasion guarding the border. In the meantime, the forward elements of the two divisions consolidated their bridgeheads, with the 132nd Infantry Division securing Maribor, and the 183rd Infantry Division pushing past Murska Sobota. Some bridges over the Drava were blown before all of the border troops had withdrawn, but some soldiers were able to swim across, the rest being captured by the advancing Germans. German patrols reached the Drava at Ptuj, and further east at Ormož they found the bridge had been blown. Elements of the XXXXIX Mountain Corps had pushed forward to Poljana and Dravograd. The German troops received close air support from dive bombers and fighters during their advance, while bombers hit targets throughout the 7th Army area. During the day, the regimental-sized Italian 3rd Alpine Group captured Kranjska Gora at the headwaters of the Sava in the sector of Mountain Detachment Triglavski. The German orders for the following day were for LI Infantry Corps to force a crossing of the Drava near Varaždin and advance on Zagreb, while XXXXIX Mountain Corps were to drive towards Celje.

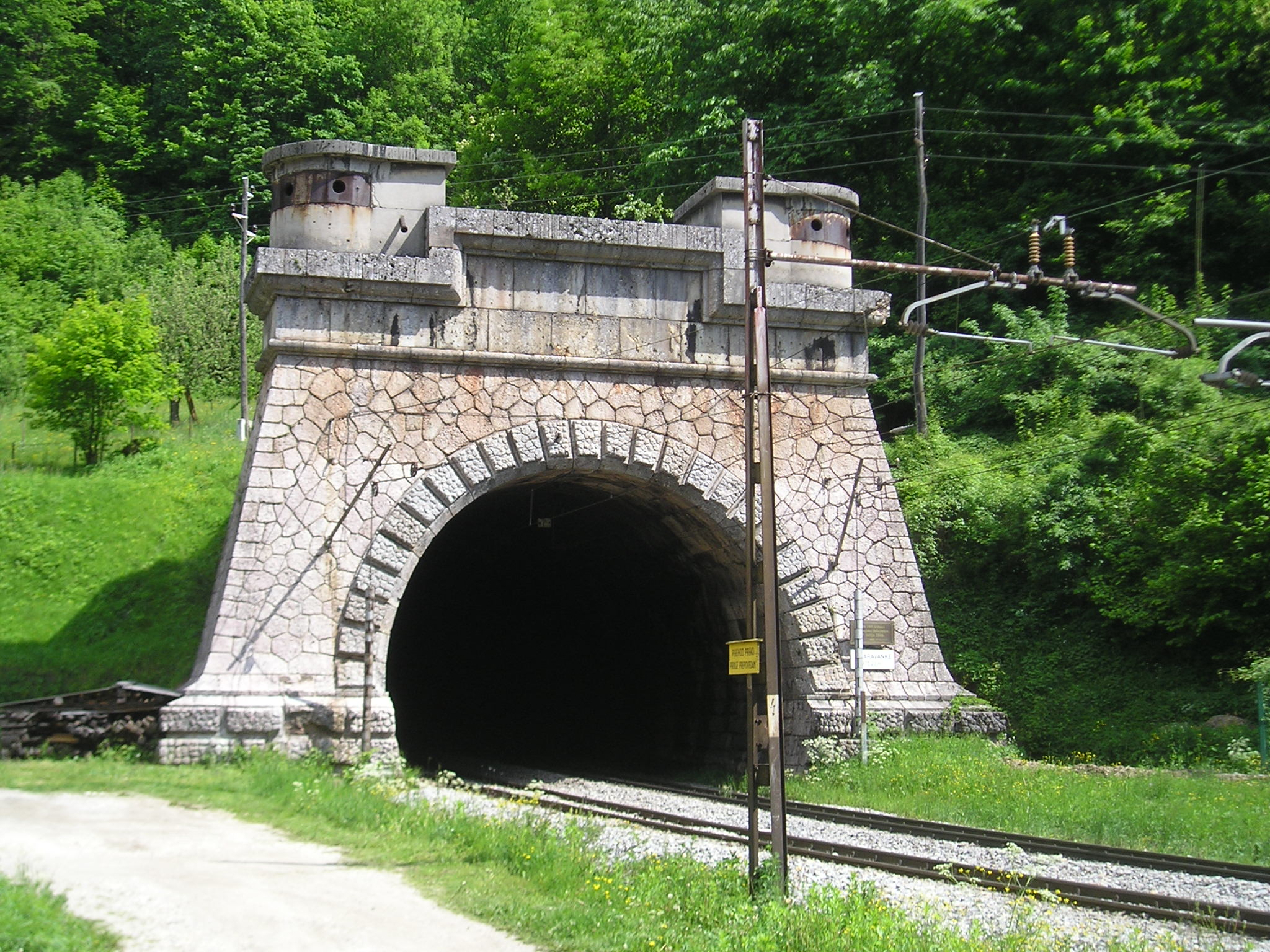
The southern exit of the Karawanks railway tunnel, secured by elements of XXXXIX Mountain Corps on 9 April 1941

On 9 April, the Germans continued their advance, and all elements of both divisions of LI Infantry Corps had finally unloaded in Graz. In view of German success, the Italian 2nd Army in northeastern Italy accelerated its preparations and issued orders for its V and XI Corps to conduct preliminary operations aimed at improving their starting positions for the planned attack on Yugoslavia. In the meantime, the 7th Army continued rapidly withdrawing its right wing, while withdrawing its centre and keeping the Mountain Detachment Rišnajaski in place on its left flank. The 38th ID continued to withdraw south from Ptuj through Krapina towards Zagreb, while the 32nd Infantry Division Triglavski (32nd ID) and Mountain Detachment Triglavski fell back to the southern bank of the Krka River. Units of LI Infantry Corps crossed the Drava along the line Maribor–Ptuj and further east, and continued to expand their bridgehead south of Maribor. Elements of XXXXIX Mountain Corps secured the southern exit of the Karawanks railway tunnel near Jesenice and expanded their bridgehead at Dravograd. Italian units made several attacks on the weakened sector of the 32nd ID and against Mountain Detachment Rišnajaski, and Detachment Lika took up positions on the coast. On the same day, the 6th Air Reconnaissance Group airfield at Cerklje was again attacked by German aircraft.

As the activities of Natlačen and his National Council of Slovenia were continuing, the Yugoslav Supreme Command ordered their arrest. However, Rupnik and the head of the operations staff of the headquarters of the 1st Army Group, Pukovnik Franjo Nikolić, hid the orders from Petrović and did not carry them out.

=== 10–11 April ===
==== 4th Army sector and the fall of Varaždin ====
Early on 10 April, Nikolić left his post and visited the senior Ustaše leader Slavko Kvaternik in Zagreb. He then returned to the headquarters, and announced that talks with the Germans for an armistice has started and that there was no longer any need for action. He also redirected 4th Army units around Zagreb to either cease operations or to deploy to innocuous positions. These actions reduced or eliminated armed resistance to the German advance.

About 09:45, the LI Infantry Corps began crossing the Drava, but the construction of a bridge near Maribor was suspended because the river was in flood. Despite this, the 183rd Infantry Division managed to secure an alternative crossing point, and established a bridgehead. This crossing point was a partially destroyed bridge, guarded by a single platoon of the 1st Bicycle Battalion of Detachment Ormozki. This crossing, combined with the withdrawal of the 7th Army's 38th ID from the line Slovenska Bistrica–Ptuj exposed the left flank of Detachment Ormozki. The Detachment attempted to withdraw south, but began to disintegrate during the night 10/11 April, and the 1st Bicycle Battalion left to return to Ljubljana. In the afternoon, the remaining elements of the 42nd ID also began to withdraw though Varaždinske Toplice to Novi Marof, leaving the Ustaše to take control of Varaždin.

===== Zákány bridgehead =====
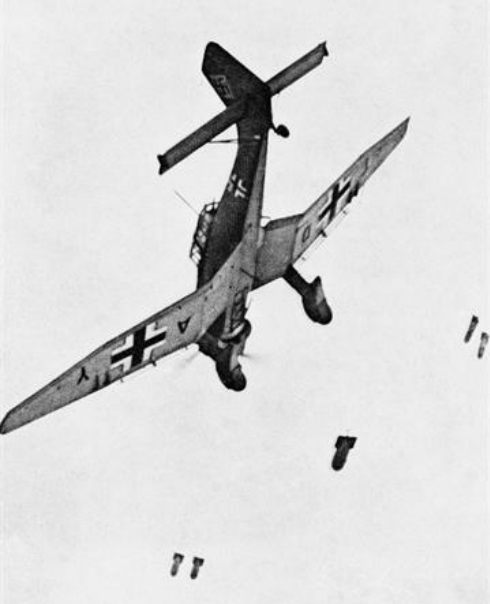
Junkers Ju 87B divebombers supported the breakout of the 14th Panzer Division from its Zákány bridgehead

On the same day, Generalmajor Friedrich Kühn's 14th Panzer Division of XXXXVI Motorised Corps, supported by dive bombers, crossed the Drava at Zákány and drove southwest towards Zagreb on snow-covered roads in extremely cold conditions. Initial air reconnaissance indicated large concentrations of Yugoslav troops on the divisional axis of advance, but these troops proved to be withdrawing towards Zagreb. Degraded by revolt and fifth-column activity, the 27th ID numbered about 2,000 effectives when the German attack began. The 14th Panzer Division vanguard reached their positions around 08:00, and the remnants of the division began withdrawing under heavy air attack. Around 14:00, the Yugoslavs were quickly encircled by German motorised troops that had outflanked them. The divisional headquarters staff escaped, but were captured a little further down the road. The remnants of the 2nd Cavalry Regiment had to fight its way towards Bjelovar, but was attacked by German tanks on the outskirts, captured and detained. The 14th Panzer Division continued its almost completely unopposed drive on Zagreb using two routes, Križevci – Dugo Selo – Zagreb and Bjelovar – Čazma – Ivanić-Grad – Zagreb.

===== Fall of Zagreb =====
About 17:45 on 10 April, Kvaternik and SS-Standartenführer (Note: Equivalent to a U.S. Army colonel.) Edmund Veesenmayer went to the radio station in Zagreb and Kvaternik proclaimed the creation of the Independent State of Croatia (Croatian: Nezavisna Država Hrvatska, NDH). The 35th Infantry Regiment of the 27th ID was disbanded by its commander when he heard news of the proclamation. By 19:30 on 10 April, lead elements of the 14th Panzer Division had reached the outskirts of Zagreb, having covered nearly 160 kilometres (99 miles) in a single day. By the time it entered Zagreb, the 14th Panzer Division was met by cheering crowds, and had captured 15,000 Yugoslav troops, including 22 generals.

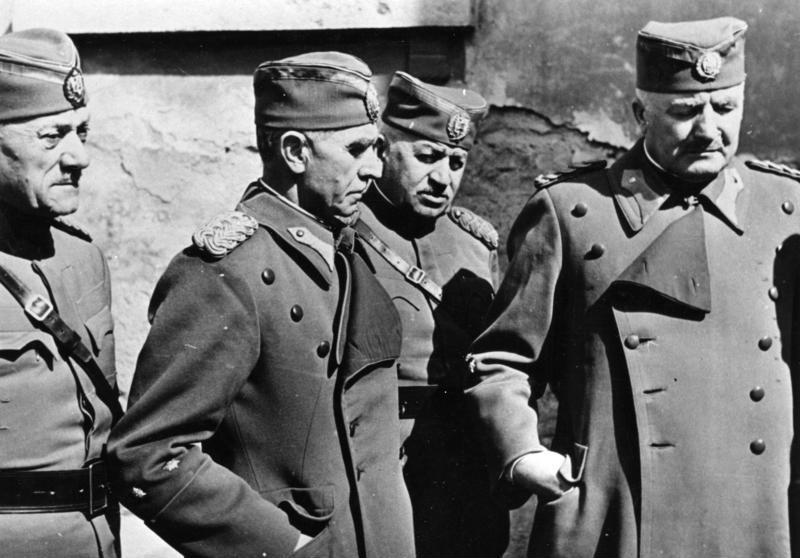
A group of captured Yugoslav generals in Zagreb

About 19:45, the 1st Army Group held a conference in Zagreb, just as German tanks were entering the city. Nedeljković told Petrović that he could no longer hold his positions, but despite this, Petrović ordered him to hold for at least 2–3 days to enable the withdrawal of the 7th Army to the Kupa river. Nedeljković replied that he no longer had an army, and suggested that all Serb officers and men be ordered back to form a defensive line along the Sava and Una rivers. Petrović refused to consider this, but ordered the understrength 1st Cavalry Division to form a defensive line along the Sava between Jasenovac and Zagreb.

Held up by freezing weather and snowstorms on 10 April, the LI Infantry Corps was approaching Zagreb from the north, and bicycle-mounted troops of the 183rd Infantry Division had turned east to capture Varaždin, along with an entire Yugoslav brigade including its commanding general. On the same day, the German-installed interim Croatian government called on all Croats to stop fighting, and in the evening, LI Infantry Corps entered Zagreb and relieved the 14th Panzer Division. In the face of the assault by the 14th Panzer Division, the 4th Army quickly ceased to exist as an operational formation. The disintegration of the 4th Army was caused largely by fifth column activity, as it was involved in little fighting.

===== Barcs bridgehead =====
The 40th ID was battered by German artillery fire during the night 9/10 April. Seriously depleted by desertion and weakened by revolt, it was unable to mount the ordered counter-attack against the Barcs bridgehead on the morning of 10 April. The two forward infantry regiments could only muster about 600 men each. The divisional cavalry squadron was also heavily reduced in strength, and divisional artillery amounted to one anti-aircraft battery. The border units, responsible for demolition tasks on the line from Bjelovar south to Čazma, refused to follow orders. Having abandoned the counter-attack, the divisional commander decided to establish a defensive line at Pćelić to hinder German movement east towards Slatina.

Soon after dawn, the main thrust of the XXXXVI Motorised Corps, consisting of Generalmajor Walter Neumann-Silkow's 8th Panzer Division leading Generalmajor Sigfrid Henrici's 16th Motorised Infantry Division, crossed the Drava at Barcs. Anti-tank fire destroyed a few of the lead tanks, but after the Germans reinforced their vanguard, the resistance of the 40th ID had been broken by noon. The remaining forward infantry troops were either captured or fled into the hills to the south. Units of the infantry regiment that had been providing depth to the defensive position began retreating south towards Slavonska Požega. Ustaše sympathisers and Yugoslav Volksdeutsche (ethnic German) troops either ran away or surrendered. By 13:30, the hard-pressed divisional cavalry squadron began to withdraw south towards Daruvar, attacking rebelling troops along their route. The divisional commander himself fled to Nova Gradiška via Voćin and Slavonska Požega, during which his car was again fired on by rebel troops. The 8th Panzer Division continued southeast between the Drava and Sava rivers, and meeting almost no further resistance, had reached the right flank of the 4th Army sector at Slatina by evening. Right flank elements of the 8th Panzer Division penetrated south into the Bilogora range, reaching Daruvar and Voćin by evening.

==== 7th Army sector ====
During the night of 9/10 April, lead elements of the XXXXIX Mountain Corps, consisting of Generalmajor Hubert Lanz's 1st Mountain Division de-trained and crossed the border near Bleiburg and advanced southeast towards Celje, reaching a point about 19 kilometres (12 mi) from the town by evening. Luftwaffe reconnaissance sorties revealed that the main body of the 7th Army was withdrawing towards Zagreb, leaving behind light forces to maintain contact with the German bridgeheads. When it received this information, the 2nd Army headquarters ordered the LI Infantry Corps to form motorised columns to pursue the 7th Army south, but extreme weather conditions and flooding of the Drava at Maribor on 10 April slowed the German pursuit.

About 06:00 on 11 April, the LI Infantry Corps recommenced its push south towards Zagreb, with lead elements exiting the mountains northwest of the city in the evening of the same day, while the 1st Mountain Division captured Celje after some hard marching and difficult fighting. Emissaries from the newly formed National Council of Slovenia approached Kübler to ask for a ceasefire. Also on 11 April, the Italian 2nd Army commenced offensive operations around 12:00, with the XI Corps pushing through Logatec towards Ljubljana, VI Corps advancing in the direction of Prezid, while strong formations attacked south through Fiume towards Kraljevica and towards Lokve. By this stage, the 7th Army was withdrawing, although some units took advantage of existing fortifications to resist. To assist the Italian advance, the Luftwaffe attacked Yugoslav troops in the Ljubljana region, and the 14th Panzer Division, which had captured Zagreb on 10 April, drove west to encircle the withdrawing 7th Army. The Italians faced little resistance, and captured about 30,000 Yugoslav troops waiting to surrender near Delnice.

=== Fate ===
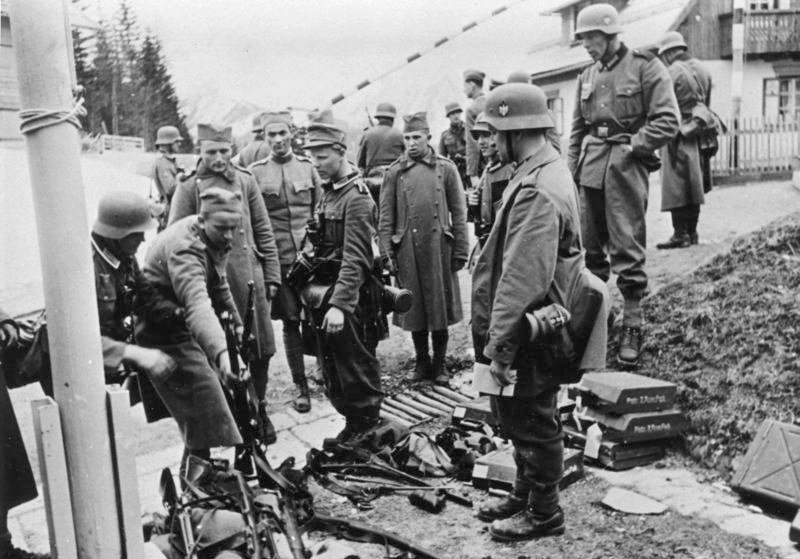
Surrendered Yugoslav troops handing in their weapons

On 10 April, as the situation had become increasingly desperate throughout the country, Simović, who was both the Prime Minister and Yugoslav Chief of the General Staff, broadcast the following message:

All troops must engage the enemy wherever encountered and with every means at their disposal. Don't wait for direct orders from above, but act on your own and be guided by your judgement, initiative, and conscience.

On 12 April, the 14th Panzer Division linked up with the Italians at Vrbovsko, closing the ring around the remnants of the 7th Army, before thrusting southeast towards Sarajevo. The remaining elements of the 4th Army had organised defences around the towns of Kostajnica, Bosanski Novi, Bihać and Prijedor, but the 14th Panzer Division quickly broke through at Bosanski Novi and captured Banja Luka, and by 14 April it had captured Jajce. In the wake of the panzers, the 183rd Infantry Division pushed through Zagreb and Sisak to capture Kostajnica and Bosanska Gradiška. On 15 April, the 14th Panzer Division was closing on Sarajevo. The Ustaše arrested the staffs of the 1st Army Group, and 4th and 7th Armies at Petrinja, and the 1st Army Group effectively ceased to exist as a formation. After a delay in locating appropriate signatories for the surrender document, the Yugoslav High Command unconditionally surrendered in Belgrade effective at 12:00 on 18 April. Records of Yugoslav killed and wounded during the invasion were lost, but about 375,000 Yugoslav troops were captured. The Germans lost only 151 killed, 392 wounded and 15 missing in action during the entire invasion. Yugoslavia was then occupied and dismembered by the Axis powers, with Germany, Italy, Hungary, Bulgaria and Albania all annexing parts of its territory. Most of the Slovene members of the 1st Army Group taken as prisoners of war, along with virtually all of its Croat members, were soon released by the Axis powers, as 90 per cent of those held for the duration of the war were Serbs.
