= Milorad Petrović =

Yugoslav general (1882–1981)

Army general Milorad Petrović
- Милорад Петровић
- Born: 18 April 1882; Sumrakovac, Kingdom of Serbia
- Died: 12 June 1981 (aged 99); Belgrade, Yugoslavia
- Military career
- Allegiance: Kingdom of Serbia; Kingdom of Yugoslavia
- Branch: Royal Serbian Army; Royal Yugoslav Army
- Service years: 1901–1945
- Rank: Army general
- Nickname: Lord
- Commands: 1st Army; Belgrade garrison; 1st Army Group
- Conflicts: Balkan Wars; World War I; Serbian Campaign; Macedonian front; World War II; Invasion of Yugoslavia (1941) (POW)

Milorad Petrović (Serbian Cyrillic: Милорад Петровић; 18 April 1882 – 12 June 1981) was an Army general (lieutenant general) (Note: Equivalent to a U.S. Army lieutenant general.) in the Royal Yugoslav Army who commanded the 1st Army Group during the April 1941 German-led invasion of Yugoslavia by the Axis powers in World War II. Petrović was commissioned into the Royal Serbian Army in 1901 and served in multiple staff positions during the Balkan Wars. During World War I, he served in various staff roles at the army and divisional level during the Serbian Campaign and later on the Macedonian front. Following the war, he took part in military operations along the disputed northern border of the nascent Kingdom of Serbs, Croats and Slovenes, which was renamed the Kingdom of Yugoslavia in 1929. During the interwar period, Petrović was steadily promoted, performing key roles at the Ministry of the Army and Navy. He reached the rank of army general in 1937. At the time of the 27 March 1941 Yugoslav coup d'état, he was the military commander of the Yugoslav capital, Belgrade.

In the wake of the coup, Petrović urged immediate mobilisation, but this did not occur until 3 April, by which time Adolf Hitler had already issued orders for Yugoslavia's invasion. Petrović was appointed to command the 1st Army Group, responsible for the country's northern borders with Germany, Italy and Hungary. His formations were only partially mobilised by the time the invasion began on 6 April, and significant fifth column activities affected them from the outset. On 10 April, two determined armoured thrusts by the Germans caused the 1st Army Group to disintegrate, and the following day, Petrović was captured by fifth columnists. He was soon handed over to the Germans and spent the rest of the war in a prisoner of war camp in Germany.

After the war, Petrović chose to return to the newly established communist-led Federal People's Republic of Yugoslavia, and settled in Belgrade. He was the lifelong president of a veterans' association for those who had participated in the Royal Serbian Army's 1915 withdrawal to the Greek island of Corfu. He lived in Belgrade until his death in 1981, aged 99.

== Early life and military career ==
Milorad Petrović was born in the village of Sumrakovac, in the Zaječar district of eastern Serbia, on 18 April 1882. He was the son of the merchant Vatko Petrović and his wife Jovica. Milorad had a brother who became a judge in Priština. After completing his primary and secondary education, Milorad was appointed as an officer cadet in the Royal Serbian Army, and attended the Military Academy in Belgrade, where he underwent general staff training. In 1901, he was commissioned in the rank of poručnik (lieutenant). (Note: Equivalent to a U.S. Army lieutenant.) His initial posting to the 15th Infantry Regiment was followed by stints at the Musketry School and the 18th Infantry Regiment. On 4 October 1908, he was posted to command a company of the 4th Infantry Regiment. At the beginning of the First Balkan War in 1912, he was appointed an orderly officer at the Serbian Supreme Command, and later that year was promoted to the rank of kapetan prve klase (captain first class). (Note: Equivalent to a U.S. Army captain.) The following year he was moved to the operations section of the Supreme Command, and remained in this position until the end of the Second Balkan War. In 1913, he was promoted to the rank of major and commanded troops at Skopje's central railway station during a revolt by recently conquered ethnic Albanians.

Petrović married Jovanka Stojančević, a medical student from Zagreb, whose father Šime was a judge in the Supreme Court of Cassation in Belgrade. The couple had three children; two daughters, Milica and Mirjana; and a son, Branislav. Branislav qualified as a lawyer and then worked as a correspondent for Reuters, The Guardian and Agence France-Presse in Belgrade. Petrović went by the nickname Lord.

== World War I ==
When World War I broke out in 1914, Petrović was in command of the troops guarding the Belgrade Main railway station. In November and December 1914, during the third Austro-Hungarian offensive into Serbia, Petrović was a staff officer at the headquarters of the First Army commanded by Army general (lieutenant general) (Note: Equivalent to a U.S. Army lieutenant general.) Živojin Mišić. During his time in this position, the First Army fought the Battle of Kolubara, a decisive victory for the Serbs. In 1915, Petrović was an assistant chief of staff on the headquarters of the Infantry Division Timočka, and was promoted to the rank of potpukovnik (lieutenant colonel). (Note: Equivalent to a U.S. Army lieutenant colonel.) Between December 1915 and February 1916, after the Royal Serbian Army's long withdrawal through Montenegro, he commanded an army camp at Valona in Albania. By 10 February 1916, the Royal Serbian Army had evacuated from Albania to the Greek island of Corfu, and there it regrouped.

The Macedonian front emerged in 1916, during which a multinational Allied force attempted to assist the Royal Serbian Army in pushing back the Bulgarian Army, which was supported by other members of the Central Powers. At this time, Petrović returned to his previous role in the Infantry Division Timočka. The following year he held the position of assistant chief quartermaster of the division, and in 1918 he was posted as chief of staff of the Infantry Division Drinska. Following the war, Serbia united with the nascent State of Slovenes, Croats and Serbs to form the Kingdom of Serbs, Croats and Slovenes. In 1919, Petrović participated in military operations in parts of the former Duchy of Carinthia, which was disputed between the Kingdom of Serbs, Croats and Slovenes and the rump state of German-Austria.

== Interwar period ==
On 4 May 1920, Petrović was appointed as the chief of staff of the Savska divisional district, but on 6 November he was posted as assistant chief of staff of the 3rd Army. This was followed on 24 November 1921 with appointment as the chief of the operations staff at the Supreme Command in Belgrade. From 23 January 1922 until 20 October 1923, he was also a tactics instructor for the senior school of the Military Academy, in addition to his duties at the Supreme Command. On 17 September 1923, he was placed in command of the 9th Infantry Regiment. On 3 March 1924, he was posted as acting chief of staff to the Chief of the General Staff at the Ministry of the Army and Navy. Initially he served under Army general Milan Milovanović, but Milovanović was soon replaced by Army general Petar Pešić. On 28 June 1927, Petrović was promoted to brigadni đeneral (brigadier general) (Note: Equivalent to a U.S. Army brigadier general.) but remained in his role as acting chief of staff. In October 1929, the Kingdom of Serbs, Croats and Slovenes became the Kingdom of Yugoslavia.

On 16 September 1930, Petrović was appointed as acting commander of the Timočka divisional district based in Zaječar, and on 20 April 1932 he was posted as acting second assistant to the Minister of Army and Navy. This was followed by promotion to divisional general (major general) (Note: Equivalent to a U.S. Army major general.) on 17 December. In 1937 he was appointed as first assistant to the Minister of Army and Navy. On 27 November 1937, Petrović was appointed to command the 1st Army district based in Novi Sad, and was promoted to army general on 1 December 1938. From 12 September 1940 until 27 March 1941 he was the commander of all troops in Belgrade.

== Axis invasion of Yugoslavia ==
After unrelenting political pressure from German leader Adolf Hitler, formerly neutral Yugoslavia signed the German-Italian-Japanese alliance known as the Tripartite Pact on 25 March 1941. On 27 March, a military coup d'état overthrew the government that had signed the pact, and a new government was formed under the commander of the Royal Yugoslav Army Air Force, army general Dušan Simović. It included members who fell into three groups: those who were strongly opposed to the Axis and prepared to face war with Germany; those who advocated peace with Germany; and those that were uncommitted. The first group included Petrović, who urged an immediate general mobilisation. This was not initiated by the new government until 3 April 1941, out of fear of offending Hitler and thus precipitating war. However, on the same day as the coup, Hitler issued Führer Directive 25 which called for Yugoslavia to be treated as a hostile state, and on 3 April, issued Führer Directive 26, detailing the plan of attack and command structure for a German-led Axis invasion, which was to commence on 6 April.

The 1st Army Group was deployed along the border from Senj on the Adriatic coast to Kranj in the Julian Alps then Maribor and down to Virovitica. The major cities of Zagreb and Ljubljana, and the town of Banja Luka are also shown.

Petrović was appointed to command the 1st Army Group prior to the Axis invasion of Yugoslavia. His command consisted of the 4th Army of army general Petar Nedeljković, responsible for the Yugoslav–Hungarian border and deployed behind the Drava river between Varaždin and Slatina, and the 7th Army of divisional general Dušan Trifunović, which was responsible for the defence of the northwestern border with Italy and Germany. Petrović's army group reserve, consisting of the 1st Cavalry Division, was located around and to the south of Zagreb. The Yugoslav historian Velimir Terzić describes the mobilisation of all formations of the 1st Army Group on 6 April as "only partial", and notes that there was a limited response to mobilisation of both men and animals.

On the first day of their invasion of Yugoslavia the Germans seized bridges over the Drava river in both armies' sectors and several mountain passes in the 7th Army sector. In the 4th Army sector, the formation and expansion of German bridgeheads across the Drava were facilitated by fifth-column elements of the Croatian-nationalist Ustaše. Revolts of Croat soldiers broke out in all three divisions of the 4th Army in the first few days, causing significant disruption to mobilisation and deployment. The rest of 1st Army Group was also weakened by fifth-column activities within its major units, and Petrović's chief of staff and chief of operations aided both Ustaše and Slovene separatists in the 4th and 7th Army sectors, respectively. The revolts within the 4th Army were of great concern to Trifunović due to the danger to his right flank, but Petrović did not permit him to withdraw from border areas until the night of 7/8 April, which was followed by the German capture of Maribor as they continued to expand their bridgeheads.

The 4th Army also began to withdraw southwards on 9 April, and on 10 April it quickly ceased to exist as an operational formation in the face of two determined armoured thrusts by the XXXXVI Motorised Corps, one of which captured Zagreb that evening. Italian offensive operations also began, with thrusts towards Ljubljana and down the Adriatic coast, capturing over 30,000 Yugoslav troops near Delnice. When fifth columnists arrested Petrović and the staffs of 1st Army Group, 4th Army and 7th Army on 11 April, the 1st Army Group effectively ceased to exist. On 12 April, a German armoured column linked up with the Italians near the Adriatic coast, encircling the remnants of the withdrawing 7th Army. Remnants of the 4th Army attempted to establish defensive positions in northeastern Bosnia, but were quickly brushed aside by German armoured units as they drove towards Sarajevo. The Yugoslav Supreme Command unconditionally surrendered on 18 April. The Ustaše quickly handed Petrović over to the Germans, who sent him to a prisoner of war camp in Germany. He remained there for the rest of the war.

== Post-war ==
At the end of the war, Petrović was liberated from internment in Germany and given the option of returning to the new communist-led Federal People's Republic of Yugoslavia, which had replaced the Kingdom of Yugoslavia following the victory of the Yugoslav Partisans in 1945. In July 1946, Petrović opted to return to Yugoslavia. He was the lifelong president of a veterans' association for those who had participated in the Royal Serbian Army's 1915 withdrawal to Corfu. He also published a two-volume work about the withdrawal, entitled Across Albania.

In the early 1960s, Petrović became acquainted with the journalist David Binder, who was stationed as a New York Times foreign correspondent in Belgrade. The two met through Petrović's daughter Mirjana, who was working as Binder's secretary, and became close friends. Despite his advancing years, Petrović remained physically active well into his nineties, taking daily swims in the Sava. He lived in Belgrade until his death on 12 June 1981, aged 99.
