= Milorad Nedeljković =

Serbian politician and economist (1883–1961)

Milorad Nedeljković (3 December 1883, Knjaževac, Kingdom of Serbia – 1961, France) was a Serbian economist and Axis-collaborating politician.

== Biography ==
He graduated and got his Ph.D. from the University of Belgrade Faculty of Economics. He was a professor of national economics and finance at the Subotica Law School.

Nedeljković is best known for being part of Milan Nedić's German-collaborationist government (Government of National Salvation) during World War II as a minister. When the regime was brought down by the Yugoslav Partisans, Nedeljković left the country and while in exile would die. His brother Petar Nedeljković was a general in the Royal Yugoslav Army.

== Works ==
- 1907 Zaštita seoskog poseda
- 1909 Istorija srpskih državnih dugova
- 1921 Osnovi političke ekonomije
- 1923 Nauka o finansijama
- 1923 Ekonomsko-finansijska studija o državi - teorija činilaca proizvodnje, teorija poreza
- 1929 Naš valutni problem
- 1933 Ekonomski i pravni problem uloga na štednju
- 1933 Pogled na današnju krizu i njeno rešenje
