= 538th Frontier Guard Division =

- Active: 9 December 1939 – 18 April 1941
- Country: Nazi Germany
- Branch: Army
- Type: Infantry
- Role: Frontier Guard
- Size: understrength Division
- Garrison/HQ: Spittal, Klagenfurt and Graz
- Engagements: Invasion of Yugoslavia (World War II)

Commanders
- Notable commanders: Emmerich von Nagy

The 538th Frontier Guard Division, also known as the Division z.b.V. 538. was a short-lived German division in World War II that participated in the invasion of Yugoslavia. It was disbanded immediately after the Yugoslav surrender.

== History ==
The division was raised on 9 December 1939 in Klagenfurt within Wehrkreis XVIII using the 20th Border Defence Detachment which was stationed along the Reich-Italian border, and was commanded by Generalleutnant (Major General) Emmerich von Nagy. It was called up for duty on 28 March 1941 for the invasion of Yugoslavia. Along with the 1st Mountain Division, it was part of the XLIX Mountain Corps commanded by General der Infanterie (Lieutenant General) Ludwig Kübler.

On the first day of the invasion, the division was stationed on the northwestern part of the border between the Reich and Yugoslavia, and seized important mountain passes, hills and tunnels on the Yugoslav side of the border. These successes enabled the spearheads of the 1st Mountain Division to quickly cross the border and push deep into Yugoslav territory. The division was stood down after the invasion, and was disbanded on 18 April 1941.

== Composition ==
The division was created from the 20th Frontier Guard (German: Grenzschutz) Detachment, which included:

- 193rd Frontier Watch Sector (Spittal an der Drau)
- 194th Frontier Watch Sector (Klagenfurt)
- 195th Frontier Watch Sector (Graz)

On 1 April 1941, immediately prior to the invasion of Yugoslavia, the primary units of the division were:

- Divisional staff, administration and troops (including a motorcycle platoon, a mountain signals platoon and a military police (German: Feldgendarmerie) detachment)
- Elements of the 194th Infantry Regiment
  - 1st Battalion (3 companies)
  - 2nd Battalion (3 companies)
- Elements of the 139th Mountain Regiment
  - 1st Battalion (one company)
  - 2nd Battalion (2 companies)
- 499th Infantry Replacement Battalion (2 companies)
- Sperr Pioneer Battalion

Elements of both the 194th Infantry Regiment and 139th Mountain Regiment were detached and placed under command of the 1st Mountain Division.
