= Supreme Command (Kingdom of Yugoslavia) =

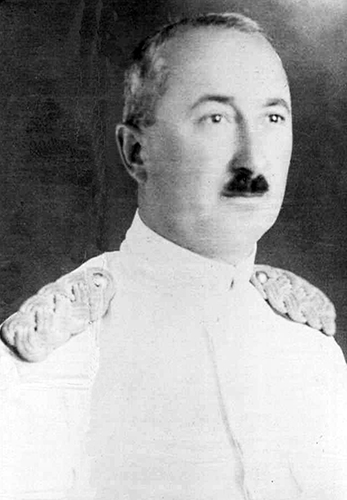
- Armijski đeneral Dušan Simović was the Yugoslav Chief of Staff of the Supreme Command during the Axis invasion of Yugoslavia
- Active: –24 August 1944
- Country: Kingdom of Yugoslavia
- Engagements: Invasion of Yugoslavia

Commanders
- Notable commanders: Milan Nedić; Dušan Simović; Danilo Kalafatović; Draža Mihailović

The Supreme Command or High Command (Serbo-Croatian: Vrhovna komanda) was the highest headquarters of the armed forces of the Kingdom of Yugoslavia during wartime. According to regulations, upon activation the general staff became the staff of the Supreme Command and the Chief of the General Staff became Chief of Staff of the Supreme Command (Načelnik štaba Vrhovne komande). While the king was at all times commander-in-chief of the armed forces, during wartime the Chief of Staff of the Supreme Command was the de facto supreme commander.

The 5th Army and the 6th Army were directly subordinate to the Supreme Command and were not attached to one of the four army groups. Four heavy artillery batteries and twelve reserve divisions—Sumadijska, Ibarska, Dunavska, Sremska, Drinska, Cerska, Bosanska, Vrbaska, Unska, Lička, Hercegovačka and Dinarska—were also attached to the Supreme Command.

== History ==
At the start of the German-led Axis invasion of Yugoslavia on 6 April 1941 the Supreme Command was held by the Prime Minister of Yugoslavia and Chief of the General Staff Armijski đeneral Dušan Simović. The Supreme Command began almost immediately to lose control of its armies and fall out of contact with their commanders. On the first day of the war, it ordered the capture of Rijeka (Fiume) from the Italians, but owing to disorders in the 4th Army this command was rescinded. That same day, Marko Natlačen formed a Slovenian national council with the intent of separating Slovenia from the kingdom. At the urging of the headquarters of the 1st Army Group, the Supreme Command ordered his arrest, but the order was never carried out. The Dinara Division (Dinarska divizija), which was part of the strategic reserve under control of the Supreme Command, disintegrated in a wave of desertions following a shootout between Croatian and Serbian officers at division headquarters.

On the evening of 10 April, the Supreme Command issued Operational Directive No. 120, ordering a general withdrawal from the frontiers to the mountainous interior, with the intention of holding the line of the Sava river. In radio messages, it urged all units to fight on their own initiative. With German troops advancing across southern Yugoslavia, the Supreme Command formed a "Sandžak Army"—in reality a much smaller unit barely combat ready—to defend Kosovo, Metohija and Sandžak. On 13 April, Simović transferred the Supreme Command to Armijski đeneral Danilo Kalafatović and ordered him to seek an armistice. Kalafatović issued Operational Directive No. 179, which stated in part:

As a result of the lack of success on all fronts, the complete dissolution of our forces in Croatia, Dalmatia and Slovenia, and the fact that after a thorough examination of the political and military situation we have concluded that any further resistance is impossible and can only lead to unnecessary bloodshed without any hope of success, and because neither the people nor their military leaders want war, we ask for a cessation of military operations against the German and Italian forces.

On 14 April, the German commander of the XXXXVI Motorised Corps advancing on Sarajevo issued an ultimatum to the headquarters of the Yugoslav 2nd Army Group demanding a ceasefire along the route of his advance and giving the Yugoslavs one hour to respond. The 2nd Army Group requested and received an extension of the ultimatum in order to confer with the Supreme Command. The next day, the Supreme Command ordered the 2nd Army Group and 4th Army to cease all military operations and not to resist the Germans. The Germans captured the Supreme Command on 15 April outside Sarajevo, where the staff was waiting to surrender. Despite being a prisoner of war, Kalafatović authorised his deputy chief of staff, Radivoje Janković, to sign an armistice and unconditional surrender with the Axis, effective at noon on 18 April.

In June 1942, Draža Mihailović, leader of the Chetniks in Yugoslavia, was appointed Chief of Staff of the Supreme Command by the Yugoslav government-in-exile. King Peter II abolished the Supreme Command by decree on 24 August 1944, but Mihailović continued to claim that he was Chief of Staff of the Supreme Command.
