= Coastal Defence Command (Kingdom of Yugoslavia) =

- Active: April 1941
- Disbanded: April 1941
- Country: Yugoslavia
- Branch: Royal Yugoslav Army
- Role: coastal defence
- Size: corps

Aircraft flown
- Reconnaissance: one flight

Map of Yugoslavia showing the naval bases of Šibenik and Boka Kotorska

The Coastal Defence Command was a Royal Yugoslav Army formation which commanded one infantry division and the two fortification divisions responsible for the land defences of the main Yugoslav naval bases during the German-led Axis invasion of the Kingdom of Yugoslavia in April 1941 during World War II. It was responsible for the defence of the Adriatic coast including the two major naval bases at Boka Kotorska and Šibenik. The divisions were the Hercegovina Division, the Boka Kotorska Fortress Division and the Šibenik Fortress Division. The Hercegovina Division was only partly mobilised at the time of the invasion, and the two fortress divisions were still in the process of mobilising. The Coastal Defence Command was supported by a coastal reconnaissance flight based out of Mostar Jasenica Airport, near Mostar.
