= Petar Nedeljković =

Yugoslav army general (1882–1955)

- Петар Недељковић
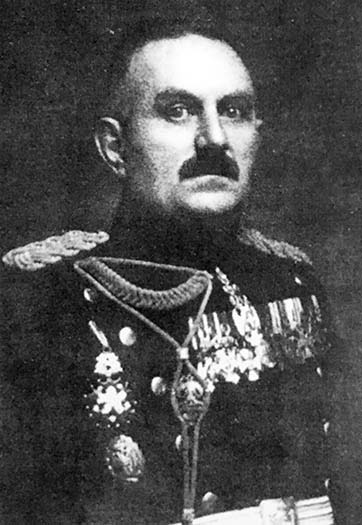
- Born: 9 August 1882
- Died: 1 November 1955 (aged 73)
- Relatives: Zivojin Nedeljković (brother); Stanoje Nedeljković (brother); Marko Nedeljković (brother); Milorad Nedeljković (brother)
- Military career
- Allegiance: Kingdom of Yugoslavia
- Branch: Royal Yugoslav Army
- Rank: Army general (Note: Serbian: Armijski General was equivalent to an American lieutenant general.)
- Commands: 4th Army
- Conflicts: World War I; World War II; Invasion of Yugoslavia (1941) (POW)

Petar Nedeljković (9 August 1882 – 1 November 1955) was an army general in the Royal Yugoslav Army who commanded the 4th Army (Note: The Royal Yugoslav Army did not field corps, but their armies consisted of several divisions, and were therefore corps-sized.) during the German-led invasion of Yugoslavia of April 1941 during World War II. Nedeljković's command consisted of three divisions, a brigade-strength infantry detachment, one horsed cavalry regiment and one infantry regiment. The 4th Army was responsible for the Yugoslav-Hungarian border and was deployed behind the Drava between Varaždin and Slatina.

== Career ==
Nedeljković commanded a division in 1936, and was then appointed as Inspector of Cavalry. He was appointed to command the 3rd Army headquartered at Skopje in May 1939.
