= Pivnica Slavonska =

Coordinates: 45°42′47″N 17°28′48″E

- Village
- Interactive map of Pivnica Slavonska
- Country: Croatia
- County: Virovitica-Podravina County
- Municipality: Suhopolje

Area
  - Total: 4.6 km^{2} (1.8 sq mi)

Population (2021)
  - Total: 32
  - Density: 7.0/km^{2} (18/sq mi)
- Time zone: UTC+1 (CET)
  - Summer (DST): UTC+2 (CEST)

Pivnica Slavonska is a village in Croatia. It is connected by the D34 highway.
