= 2023 Slovenia floods =

2023 flood in Slovenia

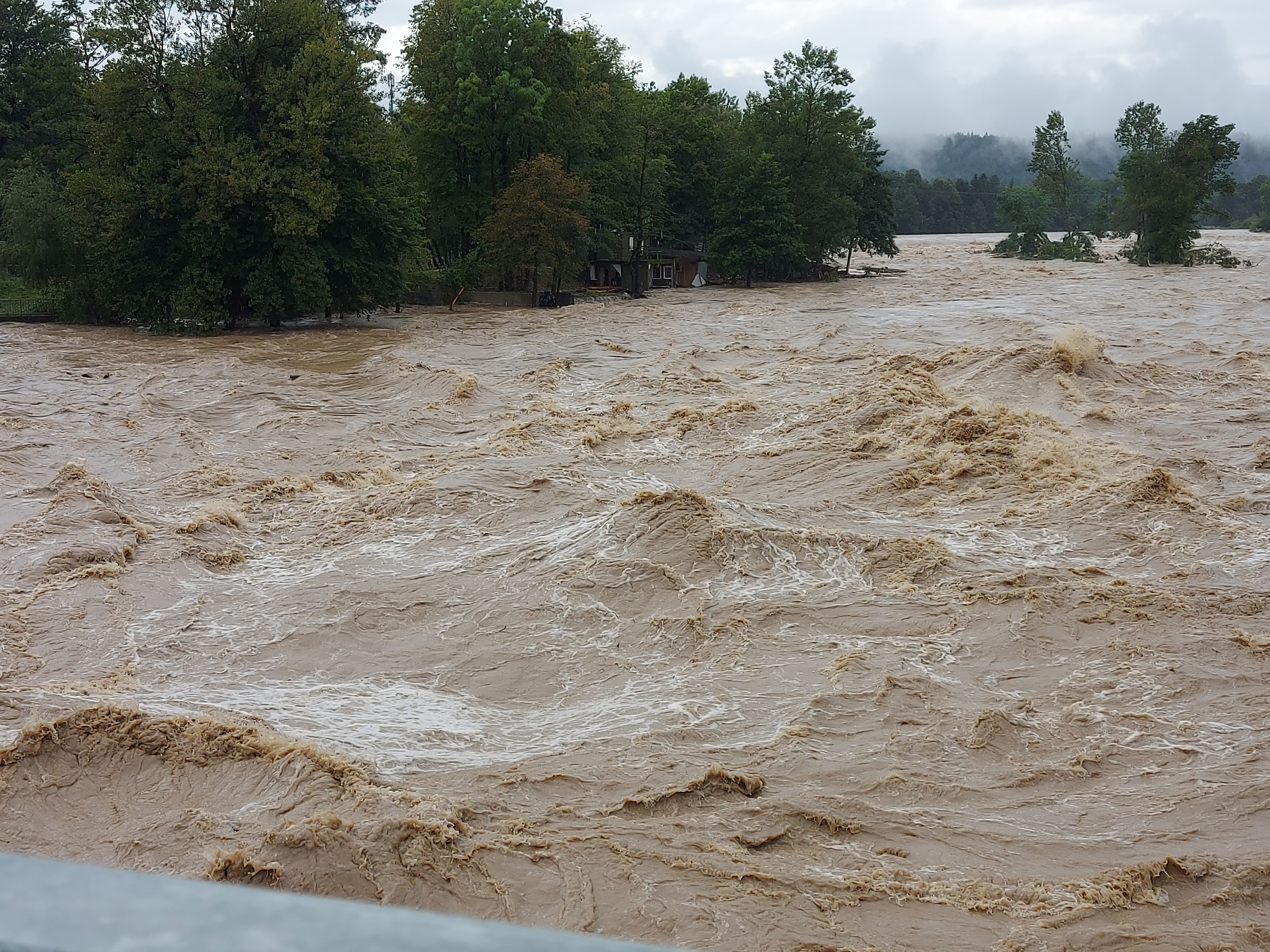
- River Sava in Ljubljana on 4 August 2023
- Date: 3 August 2023 – 23 August 2023
- Location: Slovene Littoral, Upper Carniola, Carinthia and Styria
- Deaths: 7
- Property damage: At least 7€ billion

In August 2023, major floods occurred in large part of Slovenia and neighbouring areas of Austria and Croatia due to heavy rain. Amongst others, the level of rivers Sava, Mur and Drava was exceptionally high. Several settlements and transport links in Slovene Littoral, Upper Carniola and Slovenian Carinthia were flooded. Due to the amount of rain, the streams in Idrija, Cerkno and Škofja Loka Hills overflowed. Due to the event, the National Flood Protection and Rescue Plan was activated. Slovenia had already experienced heavier rains in the second half of July. This extra water in the system meant that floods and major river overflows were caused by downpours that crossed Slovenia on the night of 3–4 August. The first rivers flooded in Upper Carniola and Posočje. These floods began on 3 August at around 20.00h. The Slovenian Environment Agency (ARSO) also warned that there was a possibility of sea flooding. The floods were similar to those that occurred in 1990, 1998 and 2004.

According to ARSO, the worst flooding was in the foothills of the Julian Alps, from Idrija through the Ljubljana basin to Slovenian Carinthia, where 150–200 mm (6–8 in) fell, on Loibl fell 275 mm (10.8 in) in 48 hours. A red hydrological warning was also applied to rivers. ARSO issued a red warning for north-eastern, north-western and central Slovenia due to prolonged downpours, which was put into effect at midnight on 4 August.

== Victims ==
At least seven people were killed during the floods. Two elderly Slovenes drowned in flooded rivers, and two Dutch men, aged 52 and 20, who had hiked to Mount Veliki Draški vrh, were also killed. The police stated that they had probably been struck by lightning. A man was found in a river in the eastern part of Slovenia, and a person helping fell into a cesspool. In Klagenfurt a man fell into the Glan.

== Overview ==
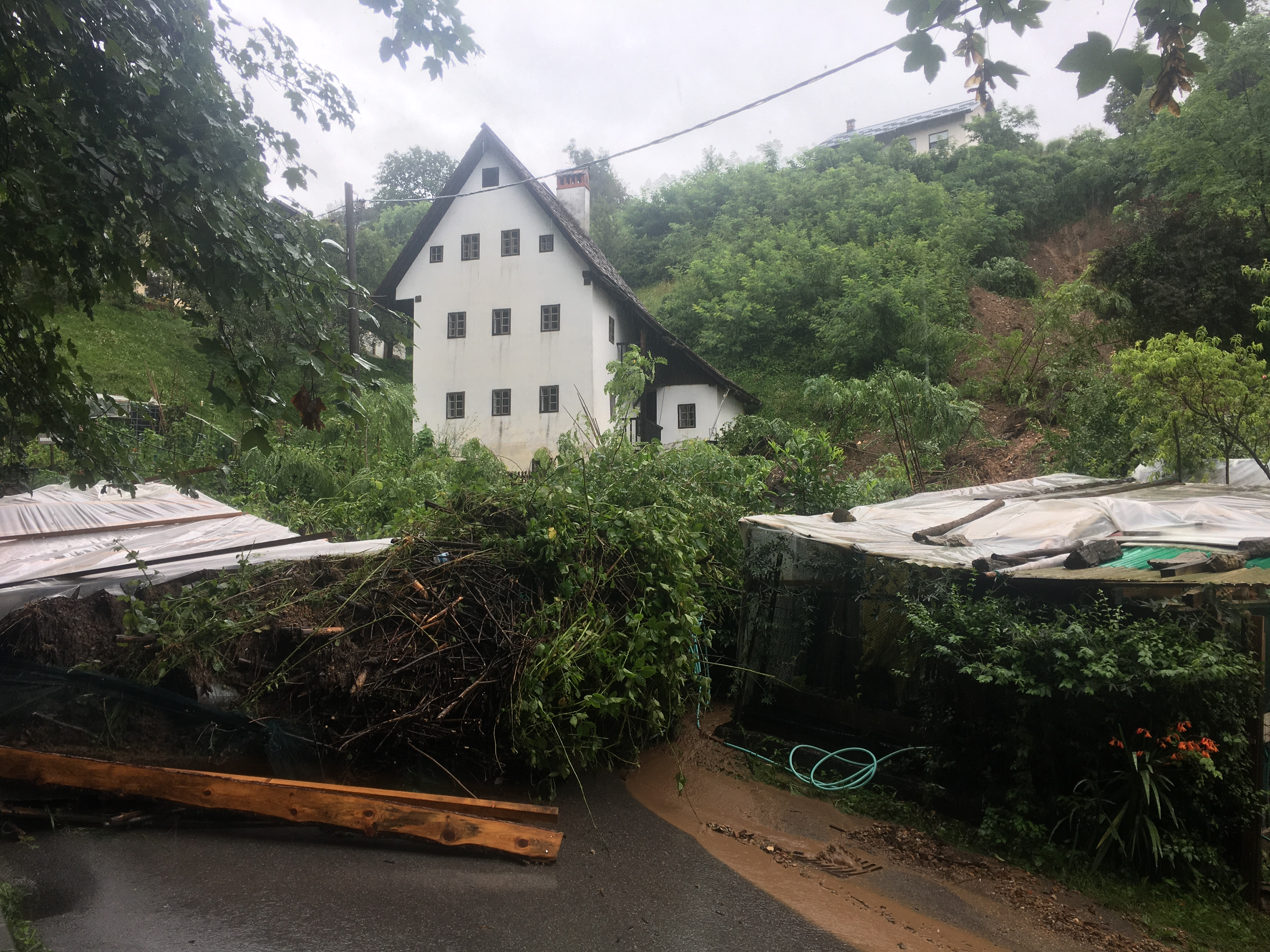
A landslide near Miner's house (Slovene: Rudarska hiša) on 4 August 2023. About 70 m long with ca. 250 m^{3} of mud and clay soil taking out farming areas.

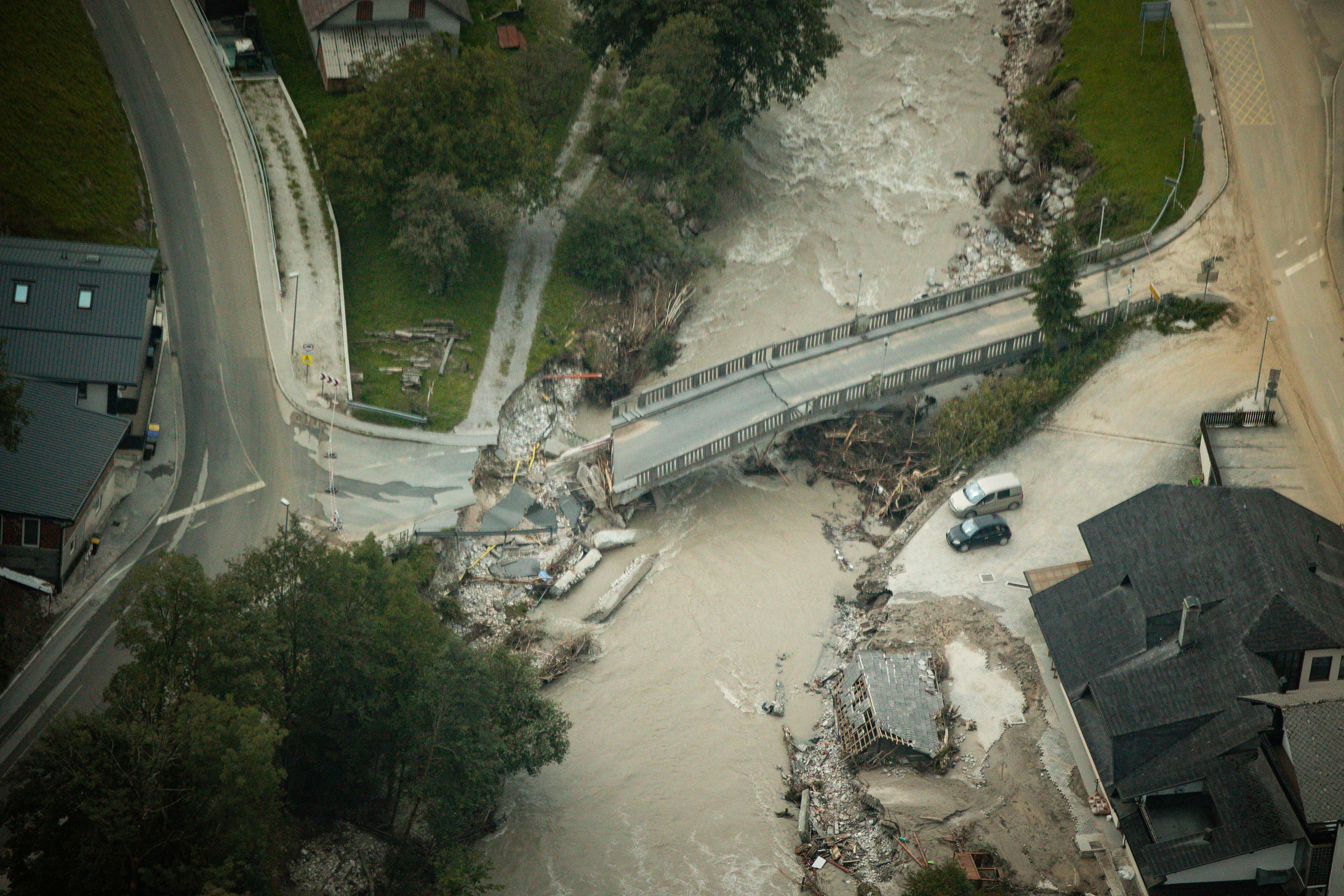
The river Kamnik Bistrica destroyed a bridge in Godič near Kamnik

According to data from the Administration for Protection and Rescue, 168 fire brigades took part in 1039 interventions within 12 hours. In so doing, they pumped water from flooded buildings, covered triggered avalanches, and removed debris and vehicles that had been swept away. In Kamnik, Komenda, the municipalities of Maribor, Ptuj, Kranj, Celje and Ljubljana, and in the municipalities of Duplek, Starše and Slovenj Gradec, sirens sounded to warn against danger from flooding and landslides. Full-scale interventions were announced in several municipalities, particularly in the municipalities of Kamnik and Komenda.

Gradaščica and Sora were flooded, and a flood wave was also expected to occur in Savinja, Pšata and Kamniška Bistrica. In the settlement of Bistričica, an elderly person was allegedly carried away by torrential flooding, but the exact cause of death is not yet known. The General Police Directorate is said to have received several reports of fatalities.

Due to flooded roads and several landslides on the surrounding roads towards Idrija and Škofja Loka, Žiri was cut off. Both the Sora and Račeva rivers flooded in Žiri, and more than 100 buildings were damaged. Two residential buildings were evacuated in Baška grapa. The evacuation took place in Sorška gaj in the Lipnica valley. Displaced residents were moved to the Medvode Sports Hall; evacuations were also carried out. All transit connections to the Kanomlja valley have been cut off, and rescue service interventions in the wider Idrija area were complicated by impassable roads.

In Tolmin, Cerkno and Idrija, waterways flooded several houses. Residential and other buildings were also flooded in the municipalities of Vodice and Škofja Loka. Moste and Rečica ob Savinji were completely flooded. Luče, Mežica, Dravograd, Laško, Mozirje, Nazarje, Gornji Grad, Škofja Loka, Šoštanj, Florjan, Topolšica, Celje, Begunje na Gorenjskem and Poljče were also flooded. The worst flooding was in the Poljanska and Selška valleys. According to Klemno Šmid, the commander of the Gorenjska civil defense, "Gorenjska is completely under water". In Ljubljana, the Sava and Gradaščica rivers flooded in its upper reaches. In the Polhov Gradec Hills, settlements were mainly threatened by landslides. In Ljubno ob Savinji, the rising river washed away three houses, people were evacuated to the local elementary school. An evacuation was ordered in the center of Celje.

As a result of the floods, the Gorenjska highway and the Styrian highway were closed on two sections on 4 August, at 4:00 p.m. Due to this, traffic is also allowed on the highways for vehicles without a vignette. The Kranj–Jesenice, Ruše–Pilberk railway connections, the Bohinj railway tunnel and the Velenje line are also closed. Due to flooded roads and railways, public transport is difficult. Several roads, both regional and local, were also closed, mainly due to collapse of the carriageway, landslides, deposits of sand and mud or high water on the roadway. A bridge was washed away on Otliške Vrh and the Slovenian Army is studying the possibilities of erecting a pontoon bridge. Most of the roads in Zgornje Savinjsko were also closed.

The Ministry of Defense activated the Vihra plan, which includes the assistance of the Slovenian Army in the intervention. Helicopters were dispatched to several flooded areas. The army also dispatched armored vehicles. The European Union has expressed readiness for the possible activation of the mechanism for civil assistance.

Around 16000 people lost electricity in the flooded areas. Boil water orders and notifications were issued as a precautionary measure. Due to the floods in Begunje in Gorenjska, operations were disrupted, and the hospital administration began to search for suitable places to relocate patients.

Amazing solidarity was shown by the people of Slovenia as on the first day of the floods certain groups and organizations have self-organized gathering and distributions of aid (food, water, personal hygiene products, ...) for the victims of floods. Beside professional humanitarian agencies like International Red Cross (IRC) and Slovenian Caritas, IPO Slovenija, which was one of the first to start, managed to gather and distribute record-breaking 415 tons of aid to the victims of floods in 30 days.

== Flooding in neighboring areas ==
=== Austrian Carinthia, Styria ===
Floods and landslides occurred in southern Austria. In the morning of 4 August 2023 about 4000 households were without electricity according to utility company Energie Steiermark. In Carinthia roads to multiple villages were disrupted, particularly in the Völkermarkt district. In Sankt Paul im Lavanttal, 70 households have been evacuated as a precaution for fear of flooding.

Water was being pumped out of a dam in the Viktring district of Klagenfurt, Carinthia, after concerns are raised over its stability and could break.

=== Croatia ===
The flood crest created by the rainfall in Austria and Slovenia entered Continental Croatia in the night of 5–6 August, causing localised flooding and breaking records at several gauges. The villages of Drenje Brdovečko and Autoput were among the flooded areas.

In the Drnje municipality near the confluence of Mura and Drava, a century-old high-water record was broken by more than half a metre (2 ft). Mura reached a level of 543 cm (17 ft 10 in) at 5 am local time. Croatian Armed Forces deployed 150 soldiers to assist with flood defences. Upriver of Mura's confluence, Drava's flood wave was flattened through a system of dams and reservoirs, but this was not possible on Mura.

In the morning of 7 August, Drava unexpectedly broke a channel near the Mura confluence. Water flowed through a railway embankment and flooded a large area with a 4–5-metre (13–16 ft) wave, including Lake Šoderica in Legrad municipality. The lake was scoured and the weekend houses around it inundated. In the Drnje municipality near Koprivnica, the settlement of Hlebine was in danger, and the Roma village of Autoput was flooded. The Botovo gauge, downriver of Šoderica, reached 616 cm (20 ft 3 in) late in the afternoon of 7 August. The village of Drnje and Torčec were successfully defended. Torčec was under threat of the Gliboki stream, which was fed by Drava waters through Lake Šoderica. On 9 August, Drava's flood crest was in Virovitica-Podravina County, and agricultural areas and weekend houses were flooded in three villages.

River Sava also caused damages. Part of the village of Drenje Brdovečko near Zaprešić, northwest of Zagreb, was flooded on early 5 August. Some areas near Zaprešić, including Brdovec, lack embankments and had to be defended by sandbags. One of the bridges over Sava was flooded and closed to traffic. Sava crested in Zagreb on the same day. The Sava–Odra–Sava diversion canal near Jankomir was opened in order to protect Zagreb. Four people had to be rescued from the canal bed, which is otherwise commonly used for recreational purposes. In the city, part of the parkland between Lake Jarun and Sava was flooded by groundwaters. The Sava course downriver of Zagreb, after Rugvica, is vulnerable due to the almost flat terrain, and was defended by sandbags and flooding retention areas such as Lonjsko Polje. The Rugvica gauge exceeded 932 cm (30 ft 7 in).

As of 9 August, the flood crest had not yet reached eastern Slavonia.

== Meteorology ==
Using high resolution data from ECWMS Reanalysis v5 a study from the University of Bologna found hints to a secondary peak in cyclogenesis during the summer, additionally to spring. There is a cyclone track via the Ligurian Sea, northern Italy and the northern Adriatic Sea.

The storm was named Petar, and moved from the Mediterranean via Italy, Slovenia, Austria, northwards to Germany, Poland and the Baltic Sea.

== See also ==
- Weather of 2023
