= Lundberg =

Lundberg is a surname.

== A ==
- Agneta Lundberg (born 1947), Swedish politician
- Alfred Lundberg (1852–1935), Swedish silent film actor
- Amadeus Lundberg (born 1989), Finnish singer
- Arne Lundberg (1925–1993), Swedish Scout leader
- Arvid Lundberg (born 1994), Swedish ice hockey player
- Arvid Lundberg (footballer) (born 2007), Finnish footballer

== B ==
- Brian Lundberg (born 1960), former National Hockey League player
- Britt Lundberg (born 1963), Finnish politician in the Åland Islands

== C ==
- Carin Lundberg (born 1944), Swedish politician
- Caroline Lundberg (born 1990), Swedish footballer
- Christian Lundberg (born 1970), Danish retired footballer

== E ==
- Ebbot Lundberg (born 1966), lead singer of the Swedish rock band The Soundtrack of Our Lives
- Elin Lundberg (born 1993), Swedish ice hockey player
- Emil Lundberg (born 1982), Swedish ice hockey centre
- Emma Lundberg (artist) (1869–1953), Swedish artist and architect
- Emma Lundberg (scientist), Swedish cell biologist
- Emma Octavia Lundberg (1881–1954), Swedish-American child welfare advocate
- Emma Lundberg (scientist), Swedish cell biologist
- Erik Lundberg (1907–1987), Swedish economist
- Evelyn Lundberg Stratton (born 1953), American jurist

== F ==
- Ferdinand Lundberg (1905–1995), American economist and journalist
- Filip Lundberg (1876–1965), Swedish actuary
- Fred Børre Lundberg (born 1969), Nordic combined skier
- Fredrik Lundberg (born 1951), Swedish businessman

== G ==
- Gabriel Lundberg (born 1994), Danish basketball player
- George A. Lundberg, (1895–1966) American sociologist
- George D. Lundberg (born 1933), American physician
- George G. Lundberg (1892–1981), American pilot
- Godfrey Lundberg (1879–1933), American engraver
- Gunilla Lundberg (1957–2024), Swedish swimmer
- Gust E. Lundberg (1920–1977), American entrepreneur, founder of the Sandy's fast-food restaurant chain
- Gustaf Lundberg (1695–1786), Swedish rococo pastelist and portrait painter

== H ==
- Hanna Lundberg (born 2002), Swedish orienteering competitor
- Henrik Lundberg (ice hockey forward) (born 1991), Swedish ice hockey forward
- Henrik Lundberg (ice hockey goaltender) (born 1991), Swedish ice hockey goaltender

== I ==
- Inger Lundberg (1948–2006), Swedish politician

== J ==
- Jennifer Palm Lundberg (born 1986), Miss World Sweden 2008
- Jim Lundberg (1921–1987), Australian rules footballer
- John Lundberg (born 1968), English artist and documentary filmmaker
- Johnny Lundberg (born 1982), Swedish footballer
- Jon Lundberg (born 1961), American politician

== K ==
- Kevin Lundberg (born 1952), American politician
- Knud Lundberg (1920–2002), Danish footballer, handball player and basketball player
- Kristian Lundberg (1966–2022), Swedish author
- Kristina Lundberg (born 1985), Swedish ice hockey player

== L ==
- Lisa Lundberg, Swedish sprint canoeist who competed in the early 1950s

== M ==
- Mark Lundberg (1958–2008), American opera singer
- Martin Lundberg (born 1990), Swedish ice hockey player
- Mikael Lundberg (born 1973), Swedish golfer

== N ==
- Nataya Lundberg (born 1992), stage name Praya Lundberg, Swedish-Thai actress and model

== O ==
- Odd Lundberg (1917–1983), Norwegian speed skater

== P ==
- Peter Lundberg (born 1981), Finnish football manager and former player
- Praya Lundberg (born 1992), Swedish-Thai actress and model

== R ==
- Ragnar Lundberg (1924–2011), Swedish pole vaulter
- Rolf Gustav Lundberg (fl. 1966–1976), Norwegian handball player

== S ==
- Sara Lundberg (born 1971), Swedish illustrator and children's author
- Sigfrid Lundberg (1895–1979), Swedish road racing cyclist
- Stefan Lundberg (born 1989), American soccer player
- Stina Lundberg Dabrowski, (born 1950), Swedish journalist

== U ==
- Ulf Lundberg (born 1955), Swedish former footballer
- Ulla-Lena Lundberg (born 1947), Finland-Swedish author

== V ==
- Victor Lundberg (1923–1990), American radio personality who had a top 10 hit single
- Viktor Lundberg (born 1991), Swedish footballer

== See also ==
- Charles Lundberg Three-Decker, historic triple decker in Worcester, Massachusetts
- Lundberg Bakery (Austin, Texas), historic bakery building in downtown Austin, Texas
- Lundberg Family Farms, based in Richvale, California, produces, packages, and markets organic foods
- Lundberg lag, the lag between changes in the demand and response in output
- Lundbergs, shortened form of the Swedish financial services company L E Lundbergföretagen
