= Emma Lundberg =

Emma Lundberg may refer to:

- Emma Lundberg (artist) (1869–1953), Swedish artist and architect
- Emma Octavia Lundberg (1881–1954), Swedish-American child welfare advocate
- Emma Lundberg (scientist), Swedish cell biologist
