= Prince Eduard Franz of Liechtenstein =

Prince Eduard Franz
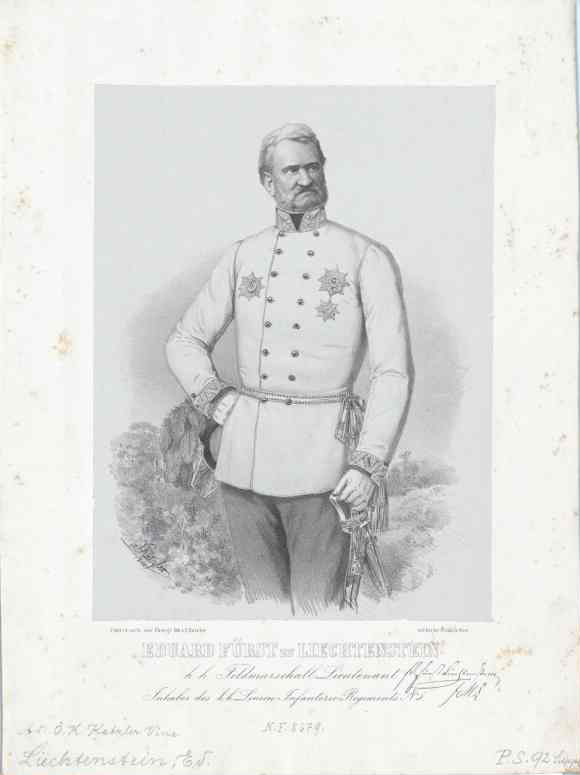
- Born: 22 February 1809; Vienna
- Died: 27 June 1864 (aged 55); Karlsbad
- Spouse: Honoria Hrabina Choloniowa-Choloniewska (m. 1839)
- Issue: Prince Aloys; Princess Marie; Prince Heinrich; Princess Anna; Prince Friedrich; Prince Eduard
Names
- Eduard Franz Ludwig
- House: Liechtenstein
- Father: Johann I Joseph
- Mother: Landgravine Josefa of Fürstenberg-Weitra

Prince Eduard Franz of Liechtenstein (Eduard Franz Ludwig; 22 February 1809 – 27 June 1864) was a son of Johann I Joseph, Prince of Liechtenstein (1760–1836) and wife Landgravine Josefa of Fürstenberg-Weitra, nephew of Aloys I, brother of Aloys II and uncle of Johann II and Franz I.

Prince Eduard Franz was born in Vienna.

== Marriage and issue ==
On 15 October 1839, in Chorostków, he married Honoria Hrabina Choloniowa-Choloniewska (Ochlopów, 1 August 1813 – Brno, 1 September 1869), and had two children:

- Prince Maria Johann Aloys (Lemberg, 25 June 1840 – Güns, 29 March 1885), married in Pressburg on 26 November 1870 Anna Gräfin von Degenfeld-Schonburg (Ramholz, 13 May 1849 – Schwarzach im Pongau, 17 September 1933), who married secondly Andreas Graf von Plater-Syberg (- Bolzano, 18 June 1928), and had issue:
  - Prince Friedrich Aloys Johannes Maria (Arad, 12 September 1871 – Rosegg, 10 October 1959), married in Vienna on 14 October 1897 Maria Gräfin Apponyi de Nagy-Appony (Vienna, 24 May 1877 – Rosegg, 24 November 1956), and had issue:
    - Prince Aloys Géza Georg Hubert Maria (Vienna, 18 June 1898 – k.i.a. in World War II in Buzowka, Russia, 19 February 1943), married civilly in Villach on 6 October 1938 and religiously in Würzburg on 20 October 1938 Hertha-Maria Gräfin Wolffskeel von Reichenberg (Würzburg, 31 August 1919 –), and had issue:
      - Prince Luitpold Rudolf Georg Hubertus (Würzburg, 11 April 1940 – Judenburg. 11 May 2016), married firstly in Salzburg on 22 November 1969 and divorced in 1997 Ulrike Gräfin von Habsburg-Lothringen (b. Salzburg, 29 December 1945), and had issue, and married secondly in Griffen on 27 November 1998 Edith Pelchen (b. 26 January 1946), without issue:
        - Prince Friedrich Aloys Ottmar Heinrich Ferdinand Alfred Maria (Judenburg, 18 October 1970 – Leoben, 24 October 1970)
        - Prince Carl Georg Aloys Maria (b. Graz, 19 September 1978)
      - Princess Maria-Gabrielle (b. Würzburg, 7 September 1942), married in Baden near Vienna civilly on 1 August 1968 and religiously on 2 August 1968 Alfons Matthias Brandis (Baden near Vienna, 19 July 1922 – Salzburg, 28 March 2001), son of Anton Brandis and wife Leopoldine Fischer, and had issue:
        - Andrea Brandis (b. 31 December 1968), unmarried and without issue
        - Alexandra Brandis (b. 1 April 1970), unmarried and without issue
    - Princess Andrea Maria Anna (Vienna, 18 June 1898 – Salzburg, 6 April 1944), married in Högyész on 14 April 1921 Peter Graf von Ueberacker (Aigen, 21 October 1895 – Weyregg am Attersee, 22 June 1961), son of Othmar Graf von Ueberacker and wife Maria von Aickinger, and had issue:
      - Friedrich Graf von Ueberacker (Rosegg, 4 February 1922 – k.i.a. in World War II in France, 6 December 1942)
    - Prince Alfred Joseph Karl Maria (Pressburg, 6 June 1900 – Klagenfurt, 29 March 1972), married in Ungarschitz on 24 June 1928 Polixena Gräfin von Collalto und San Salvatore (Teschendorf, 16 October 1905 – Conegliano, Treviso, 11 August 1984), and had issue:
      - Prince Alexander Friedrich Manfred Maria (Vienna, 14 May 1929 – Rosegg, 16 March 2012), married in Bronnbach an der Tauber civilly on 27 December 1960 and religiously on 7 January 1961 Josephine Prinzessin zu Löwenstein-Wertheim-Rosenberg (b. Bronnbach, 17 May 1937), and had issue:
        - Prince Christian Alfred Carl Manfred Alexander Joseph Maria (b. Klagenfurt, 14 November 1961), married civilly in Vaduz on 10 March 1989 and religiously in Maria-Thann on 20 May 1989 Marie-Christine Gräfin von Waldburg-Zeil-Hohenems (b. Ravensburg, 2 July 1962), and had issue:
          - Princess Carolina Maria Josepha Florentine (b. Villach, 3 June 1990)
          - Prince Augustinus Maria Alfons Emanuel (b. Basel, 20 May 1992)
          - Prince Johannes Maria Nikolaus Antonius (b. Bern, 3 July 1995)
          - Princess Ludmilla Maria Christina Clara (b. Villach, 19 June 2001)
        - Prince Stefan Carl Manfred Alfred Alexander Joseph Maria (b. Klagenfurt, 14 November 1961), married in Vienna on 18 June 1988 Florentine Gräfin von Thun und Hohenstein (b. Vienna, 1 January 1963), and had issue:
          - Prince Lukas Romedio Alexander Alfred Antonius Stephan Maria (b. Zürich, 27 April 1990)
          - Prince Konrad Emanuel Josef Michael Franziskus Stephan Maria (b. Frankfurt, 15 February 1992)
          - Princess Anna Maria Carolina Christine Sophia Florentine Clara (b. Frankfurt, 24 August 1994)
          - Princess Rita Maria Thérèse Alexandra Bettina Marguerite Florentine (b. Klagenfurt, 27 March 1999)
        - Prince Emanuel Alexander Pius Friedrich Joseph Franz Maria (b. Klagenfurt, 5 May 1964), married in Csicsó (Cicov) on 27 May 1995 Alexandra Gräfin Kálnoky de Köröspatak (b. Bruck, 9 June 1966; her sister's husband is Prince Ferdinand of Hohenzollern), and had issue:
          - Princess Polixena Marie Benedikta Florentine Alexandra Emanuel (b. Klagenfurt, 12 October 1996)
          - Prince Josef Maria Alexander Edoardo Ferdinand Emanuel (b. Klagenfurt, 15 December 1998)
          - Princess Ilona Maria Josefa Christiana Alexandra Emanuel (b. Villach, 20 July 2001)
      - Princess Elisabeth Franziska Anna Thekla Maria Therese Manfreda Leopoldine Juliana Antonia (b. Vienna, 17 January 1932- August 2018), married in Rosegg on 31 October 1964 Ricardo Barone Winspeare-Guicciardi (Naples, 17 October 1912 – Depressa, Lecce, 15 January 2002), son of Edoardo Barone Winspeare Guicciardi and wife Clara Sarauw, and had issue:
        - Edoardo Barone Winspeare-Guicciardi (b. Klagenfurt, 14 September 1965), married Celeste Casciaro, an actress, with issue
        - Francesco Barone Winspeare-Guicciardi (b. Klagenfurt, 29 November 1966), twin with the below, married in Sorrento on 31 October 1993 Esmeralda Faraone Mennella, and had issue:
          - Riccardo Carlo Barone Winspeare-Guicciardi (b. Naples, 28 November 1994)
          - Constanza Maria Vittoria Baronessa Winspeare-Guicciardi (b. Poggiardo, 20 September 1997)
        - Clara Baronessa Winspeare-Guicciardi (b. Klagenfurt, 29 November 1966), twin with the above, married to Prince Antonio di Carpegna Falconieri Gabrielli, Conte di Carpegna (Rome, 23 August 1965), grandson of Princess Adelaide of Savoy-Genoa, with issue
      - Prince Franz de Paula Alfred Johannes Manfred Maria Theodor et omnes sancti (Vienna, 1 November 1935 – Villach, 25 March 1987), unmarried and without issue
    - Prince Alexander Maria (Hodonín, 20 September 1901 – Schloss Liechtenstein bei Judenburg, 9 January 1926), unmarried and without issue
    - Princess Aloysia Emanuela Maria (Vienna, 23 January 1904 – Viktring, 18 July 1993), married in Rosegg on 17 August 1929 Joseph Ritter von Miller zu Aichholz (Triest, 28 May 1897 – Klagenfurt, 30 December 1976), and had issue
  - Prince Eduard Viktor Maria (Laibach, 2 September 1872 – Monte Carlo, 8 March 1951), married in Wischenau on 31 August 1898 Olga Gräfin von Pückler und Limpurg (Stuttgart, 11 April 1873 – Salzburg, 14 February 1966), and had issue:
    - Prince Johannes Baptist Alois Ferdinand Lucas Anton Joseph Maria (Salzburg, 18 October 1899 – Honolulu, Hawaii, 5 November 1979), married firstly morganatically in London on 29 July 1931, and divorced in 1943 Aleene McFarland (Parker County, Texas, 25 January 1902 – Lubbock, Texas, 10 March 1983), daughter of Charles McFarland and Eloise McAfee ..., without issue, and married secondly morganatically in St. Johns, Apache County, Arizona, on 27 August 1945 Jean Ann French (Des Moines, Polk County, Iowa, 12 October 1917 – Honolulu, Hawaii, 28 July 2005), without issue
    - Prince Ferdinand Aloys Andreas Joseph Anton Maria (Salzburg, 18 January 1901 – Neuilly-sur-Seine, 7 July 1981), married firstly in London on 14 January 1925 Shelagh Salome Houston Brunner, after divorce created Gräfin von Rietberg on 5 December 1951 (Winnington, Cheshire, 6 February 1900 – Cambridge, 6 November 1983), daughter of Roscoe Brunner and wife Ethel Houston, and had issue, married secondly in Stockholm on 7 September 1940 and divorced by 1948 Brita Christina Nordenskiöld [Stockholm], 8 October 1919 – Kristianstad, 9 June 1971), daughter of Bengt Nordenskiöld and wife Dagmar Werner, and had issue, married thirdly in East Hampton, Suffolk County, New York, on 21 August 1950 and divorced Dorothy Haydel (St. Louis, Missouri, 29 May 1893 – Kitzbühel, 11 April 1961), without issue, and married fourthly in Sucy-en-Brie on 19 December 1968 Nadine Georgette Maria Ansay, created Prinzessin von und zu Liechtenstein on 31 June 1975 (Lille, 8 September 1916 – Boulogne-sur-Mer, 5 November 2003), married firstly to Pierre Alexandre and daughter of Hubert Ansay and wife Lucienne Legrand, without issue:
      - Christopher Richard Francis Graf von Rietberg (London, 8 May 1926 – Salisbury, 15 November 2005), married in Nyack, Rockland County, New York, on 17 September 1955 Kathleen Hamilton Mahan (New York City, New York, 5 October 1930 – London, 6 November 1982), daughter of Alfred Thayer Mahan, of New York City, New York, and wife ..., and had issue:
        - Gabrielle Kathleen Gräfin von Rietberg (b. Cambridge, 13 January 1957), married in Southwark on 30 November 2000 Paul Anthony Lucas (b. Burnley, Lancashire, 10 July 1966), and had issue:
          - Guy Charles Lucas (b. 23 February 2001)
        - Mark Andreas Graf von Rietberg (born 30 June 1959), married at Fulham Palace, in London, on 3 August 2002 Rachel Catherine McLaren (b. Guildford, Surrey, 27 February 1972), and had issue:
          - Brooke Kathleen Gräfin von Rietberg (b. London, 18 April 2004)
          - Rowan Christopher Graf von Rietberg (b. Kingston-upon-Thames, 19 June 2006)
      - Ethel Elisabeth Olga Mary Gräfin von Rietberg (Loosberg, Lower Austria, 11 September 1928 – Harrogate, 14 November 1999), married firstly in Cambridge on 16 March 1953 and divorced in 1961 Klaus Bruno von Brehm (b. Vienna, 27 October 1925), and had issue, and married secondly on 16 April 1968 Richard Douglas Loftus Onslow (Nakuru, Kenya, 11 January 1928 – Harrogate, 22 October 2005), without issue
      - Johannes (Hanno) Eduard Bengt Henrik Andreas Maria Graf von Rietberg (Helsingborg, 3 November 1941 – Stockholm, 20 August 2003), married civilly in Danderyd on 11 May 1968 and religiously in Stockholm on 11 May 1974 Kerstin Lundberg, created Prinz und Prinzessin von und zu Liechtenstein on 11 May 1974 (b. Stockholm, 16 June 1939), daughter of Carl Gustaf Lennart Lundberg and wife Tyra Elisabet Felldin, and had issue:
        - Prince Jan Andreas (b. Danderyd, 21 August 1968), married civilly in Vaduz on 4 August 2000 and religiously in Stockholm on 12 August 2000 Lena Johansson (b. Borg, 19 May 1969), daughter of Gösta Johansson and wife Viola Ivarsson-Svakko, and had issue:
          - Prince Viktor Oskar Hanno Andreas (b. Sweden, 13 February 2004)
          - Princess Tyra Wiola Josefin Lucia Filippini (b. Stockholm, 15 November 2005)
        - Prince Max Peder (b. Solna, 21 February 1972), married in Stockholm on 30 May 2003 Jaana Tuulikki Pietilä (b. Kannus, 8 August 1971)
    - Princess Ludovika Karoline Sidonie Helene Anna-Maria Assumpta (Salzburg, 18 August 1902 – Salzburg, 19 January 1903)
    - Princess Eduarda (Edina) Anna Maria Theresia (Salzburg, 16 October 1903 – Salzburg, 13 July 2001), married firstly in Vienna on 12 July 1922 Viktor Graf von und zu Trauttmansdorff-Weinsberg (Saint-Jean, 16 February 1895 – Hallein, 3 August 1969), and had issue, and married secondly in Maria-Kirchenthal on 20 August 1975 as his second wife Alexander Graf zu Pappenheim (Iszka Szent-György, 3 March 1905 – Salzburg, 6 April 1995), without issue
    - Princess Marie Gabrielle Olga Anna (Vienna, 2 May 1905 – Geneva, 5 March 1999), married firstly in Vienna on 23 June 1925 Franz Graf von Kesselstatt (Grundlsee, 17 July 1894 – Darmstadt, 2 September 1938), and had issue, and married secondly in Föhren on 20 October 1951 and divorced in 1954 Harrison Day Blair (Sterling, Logan County, Colorado, 18 November 1901 – New York City, New York, 27 February 1981), and had issue:
      - Franz de Paul Eugen Eduard Klemens Maria Graf von Kesselstatt (b. Kesselstatt, 1 May 1926), married in St. Peter-Freienstein, 27 October 1953 Louisette von Laveran-Stieber von Hinzberg (b. St. Peter-Freienstein, 12 January 1926), and had issue:
        - Gabriele Antoinette Maria Gräfin von Kesselstatt (b. Trier, 1 November 1954), married in Föhren bei Trier on 10 October 1977 Karl Wilderich Freiherr von Korff (b. Labbeck bei Xanten, 27 July 1941), and had issue:
          - Katharina Elisabeth Louisette Freiin von Korff (b. Düsseldorf, 29 October 1978)
          - Marie-Therese Theodora Freiin von Korff (b. Düsseldorf, 22 August 1980)
          - Johanna Franziska Margit Freiin von Korff (b. Düsseldorf, 29 December 1983)
        - Rudolf Georg Maria Graf von Kesselstatt (b. Trier, 31 January 1956), married in Trier on 17 October 1987 Alexandra Schneider (b. Trier, 20 July 1960), and had issue:
          - Ferdinand Eugen Georg Maria Graf von Kesselstatt (b. Trier, 8 March 1989)
          - Alexander Graf von Kesselstatt (b. Trier, 13 May 1991)
          - Antonia Gräfin von Kesselstatt (b. Trier, 28 August 1995)
        - Georg Johannes Maria Graf von Kesselstatt (b. Trier, 26 January 1957), married in Leoben-Göss on 31 August 1991 Susanne Gagstatter (b. Tuttlingen, 23 January 1960), and had issue:
          - Sophie Gräfin von Kesselstatt (Tuttlingen, 4 October 1995)
          - Johann Graf von Kesselstatt (Singen, 31 May 1999)
        - Clemens Friedrich Maria Graf von Kesselstatt (b. Trier, 7 June 1959), unmarried and without issue
        - Franz Degenhardt Maria Graf von Kesselstatt (b. Trier, 26 May 1961), married in Leoben-Göss on 31 August 1991 Magdalena Schaup (b. Graz, 10 February 1965), and had issue:
          - Johann Franz Peter Maria Graf von Kesselstatt (b. Graz, 20 June 1996)
        - Theresa Bernadette Maria Gräfin von Kesselstatt (b. Trier, 28 February 1964), married firstly in Föhren on 5 September 1987 and divorced in 1999 Gregor Vukmirovic, who changed his surname in 1992 to "Mirow" (b. Bad Münstereifel, 22 April 1959), and had issue, and married secondly on 18 August 2001 Philippe Arpels (b. 31 August 1954), without issue:
          - Philipp Rudolph Maria Mirow (b. Philadelphia, Lower Merion County, Pennsylvania, 27 August 1989)
          - Gina N N Mirow (b. 12 February 1992)
      - Johannes Graf von Kesselstatt (b. Kesselstatt, 21 May 1927), married in Palm Beach, Palm Beach County, Florida, on 23 May 1993 Beatriz Bueno de Castro (b. Cali, Colombia, 19 March 1942), without issue
    - Princess Louisanne Marie (Schloss Lichtenstein near Judenburg, 8 November 1907 – Münster, 16 April 1994), married in Alfter on 22 September 1943 Maximilian Graf von Galen (Beversunderen, 30 April 1892 – Hiltrup, 13 February 1960), without issue
- Princess Maria Josepha Cölestine Melanie Sophie (25 February 1844 – Kraków, 8 January 1858)

He died in Karlsbad, aged 55.

== Honours ==
- Austrian Empire: Knight of the Order of the Iron Crown, 2nd Class
- Kingdom of Portugal: Grand Cross of the Military Order of Aviz
- Russian Empire: Knight of the Order of St. Anna, 1st Class

== Ancestry ==
Ancestors of Prince Eduard Franz of Liechtenstein

16. Prince Philipp Erasmus of Liechtenstein
8. Prince Emanuel of Liechtenstein
17. Princess Christina of Löwenstein-Wertheim-Rochefort
4. Franz Joseph I, Prince of Liechtenstein
18. Count Karl Ludwig of Dietrichstein
9. Countess Antonia of Dietrichstein-Weichselstädt
19. Countess Maria Theresa Anna of Trauttmansdorff
2. Johann I Joseph, Prince of Liechtenstein
20. Count Franz Damian of Sternberg
10. Count Franz Philipp of Sternberg
21. Countess Maria Josepha of Trauttmansdorff
5. Countess Leopoldine of Sternberg
22. Count Conrad Sigismund of Starhemberg
11. Countess Leopoldine of Starhemberg
23. Princess Maria Leopoldine of Löwenstein-Wertheim-Rochefort
1. Prince Eduard Franz of Liechtenstein
24. Prosper Ferdinand, Landgrave of Fürstenberg-Stühlingen
12. Ludwig August Egon, Landgrave of Fürstenberg-Weitra
25. Countess Sophie of Königsegg-Rothenfels
6. Joachim Egon, Landgrave of Fürstenberg-Weitra
26. Count Maximilian of Kirchberg
13. Countess Maria Anna of Kirchberg
27. Countess Maria Judith of Törring
3. Landgravine Josepha of Fürstenberg-Weitra
28. Count Anton Karl of Oettingen-Wallerstein
14. Count Philipp Karl of Oettingen-Wallerstein
29. Countess Maria Agnes Fugger of Glött
7. Countess Sophia Maria of Oettingen-Wallerstein
30. Kraft Anton, Count of Oettingen-Baldern and Katzenstein
15. Countess Charlotte Juliane of Oettingen-Baldern
31. Countess Maria Eleonora of Schönborn-Buchheim
