= Prince Ferdinand of Liechtenstein =

Prince Ferdinand Andreas
- Born: 18 January 1901; Salzburg
- Died: 7 July 1981 (aged 80); Neuilly-sur-Seine
- Spouse: Shelagh Salome Houston Brunner (m. 1925; div. 1934) Brita Christina Nordenskiöld (m. 1940; div. 1948) Dorothy Haydel Oelrichs (m. 1950, divorced) Nadine Georgette Maria Ansay (m. 1968)
- Issue: Christopher, Graf von Rietberg; Elisabeth, Gräfin von Rietberg; Prince Johannes
Names
- Ferdinand Aloys Andreas Joseph Anton Maria
- House: Liechtenstein
- Father: Prince Eduard of Liechtenstein
- Mother: Countess Olga of Pückler-Limpurg

Prince Ferdinand Aloys Andreas Joseph Anton Maria of Liechtenstein (18 January 1901 – 7 July 1981) was a Prince of the House of Liechtenstein and nephew of Franz I, Prince of Liechtenstein and cousin of Franz Joseph II, Prince of Liechtenstein. Prince Ferdinand was an internationally known banker, athlete and big game hunter.

== Early life ==
He was the second son of Prince Eduard Viktor Maria (1872–1951) and the former Olga, Gräfin von Pückler und Limpurg (1873–1966). His brother, Prince Johannes, married an American and moved to a ranch near Weatherford, Texas.

His paternal grandparents were Prince Eduard Franz (a son of Johann I Joseph and Landgravine Josepha of Fürstenberg-Weitra) and the former Honoria Hrabina Choloniowa-Choloniewska.

== Career ==
In 1932, he was a captain of the Austrian Olympic team that competed in Los Angeles, California. He shared a bungalow with a butcher, a policeman, and a chauffeur, all members of the team. Later that year, he qualified as a parachutist.

In 1935, thirty-four year old Prince Ferdinand left Vienna for Addis Ababa to offer his services to Haile Selassie, the Emperor of Abyssinia (modern day Ethiopia).

In 1939, Prince Ferdinand try to join Finnish army. Finnish official thought that he was German spy (Finland was in war against German ally Russia) and rejected him at the medical examination. When he was sent out of Finland he made fake news article about him fighting in Finnish army as one of the first foreign volunteers in unit called "ghost patrol" what didn't exist

In 1943, he was falsely reported to have been murdered by the Gestapo in Austria. The alleged murder, reported by his aunt, was apparently in revenge for Prince Ferdinand's help in saving fortunes of friends in Vienna. When the Nazis moved into Central Europe, he helped his friends deposit their funds in Swiss banks, a move which the Germans charged, was instrumental in the decline in the value of the mark.

== Personal life ==
Prince Ferdinand was married four times and had issue with his first two wives. He morganatically married firstly Shelagh Salome Houston Brunner (1900–1983) in London on 14 January 1925, in what was reportedly the first marriage of a member of the House of Liechtenstein history and a commoner. Shelagh was the daughter of Roscoe Brunner, chairman of Brunner Mond, and granddaughter of Sir John Brunner, 1st Baronet. A little more than a year after their marriage, her father killed her mother in a murder-suicide at Green Cottage, Roehampton, the London home of the Liechtensteins. After their divorce, she was created Countess (Gräfin) von Rietberg on 5 December 1951. Together, they were the parents of:

- Christopher Richard Francis, Graf von Rietberg (1926–2005), who married Kathleen Hamilton Mahan in 1955, a daughter of Alfred Thayer Mahan of New York City.
- Ethel Elisabeth Olga Mary, Gräfin von Rietberg (1928–1999), who married Klaus Bruno von Brehm in 1953. They divorced in 1961 and she married Richard Douglas Loftus Onslow in 1968.

While in Los Angeles for the 1932 Summer Olympics, he met actress Ina Claire. In 1934, Ferdinand and Ina bought tickets for the Italian ocean liner Vulcania bound for Cannes. His second marriage was to Brita Christina Nordenskiöld (1919–1971) in Stockholm on 7 September 1940. Brita was the daughter of Bengt Nordenskiöld and Dagmar Werner. Before divorced, they were the parents of:

- Johannes (Hanno) Eduard Bengt Henrik Andreas Maria, Graf von Rietberg (1941–2003), who married Kerstin Lundberg, the daughter of Carl Gustaf Lennart Lundberg, Commanding General of the Royal Swedish Air Force, and Tyra Elisabet Felldin in 1968. They were created Prince (Prinz) and Princess (Prinzessin) von und zu Liechtenstein on 11 May 1974.

On 21 August 1950, he married for the third time to Dorothy (née Haydel) Oelrichs (1893–1961), in East Hampton, New York. Dorothy, a daughter of Harry Haydel of St. Louis, Missouri, was the widow of Hermann Oelrichs Jr. (the only child of Hermann Oelrichs and Theresa Fair Oelrichs). She died Kitzbühel, Austria, on 11 April 1961.

On 19 December 1968, he was married in Sucy-en-Brie for the fourth and final time to Nadine Georgette Maria (née Ansay) Alexandre (1916–2003). Nadine, the former wife of Pierre Alexandre and daughter of Hubert Ansay and Lucienne Legrand, was created Princess (Prinzessin) von und zu Liechtenstein on 31 June 1975.

Prince Ferdinand died on 7 July 1981 in Neuilly-sur-Seine, France after a traffic accident. His widow, Princess Nadine, died in Boulogne-sur-Mer on 5 November 2003.
