= Mara Matočec =

Croatian folk writer and peasant activist (1885–1967)

- Born: 12 September 1885; Drnje, Kingdom of Croatia-Slavonia
- Died: 8 May 1967 (aged 81); Korija, Socialist Republic of Croatia, Yugoslavia
- Occupations: Folk writer, poet and playwright; women's rights activist, suffragist, and member of the peasant movement
- Political party: Croatian Peasant Party
- Movement: Croatian peasant movement
- Children: 4

Mara Matočec (née Jendrašic, 12 September 1885 – 8 May 1967), also known as Marija, was a Croatian folk writer, poet and playwright. She was also a women's inheritance rights activist, suffragist, and member of the peasant movement. She was a political campaigner for the Croatian Peasant Party (Croatian: Hrvatska seljačka stranka, HSS) and organised local branches of Seljačka sloga, the HSS cultural organisation.

== Biography ==
Matočec was born on 12 September 1885 in Drnje, then part of the Kingdom of Croatia-Slavonia. Her parents were Luka Jendrašić and Mara Vrbančić. She graduated from public school in Đurđevac in 1896.

Matočec married at a young age to carpenter Stjepan Matočec and gave birth to four children. After the outbreak of World War I, her husband enlisted as a soldier in the Austro-Hungarian Army. He was captured at the Russian front, and was taken as a prisoner of war to Siberia. Her husband did not return from war, so she farmed by herself. She later wrote that peasant women in the countryside had an advantage over women living in cities, as peasant women lived on their own land, had bread to eat and were with their children every day.

In 1918, Matočec became a political campaigner for Stjepan Radić and Antun Radić's Croatian Peasant Party (Croatian: Hrvatska seljačka stranka, HSS) and joined the party. She made her first speech to a large gathering of the party in Koprivnica in 1920 and was active in the party in the 1920s. She organised local branches of Seljačka sloga [hr] (Peasant harmony), the cultural organisation associated with the HSS. She was publicly critical of how women were not permitted to vote in national elections and campaigned for a change in inheritance rights. After HSS leader Stjepan Radić joined the Peasant International in Moscow in 1924, Matočec left the party.

After moving to the village of Korija, near Virovitica, in 1927, Matočec led a women's choir and an amateur theatre company there. She wrote folk plays in the 1930s for the company to perform. Her plays were also performed in Podravina, Hrvatsko zagorje and Zagreb as part of the Seljačka sloga cultural programme. Matočec also wrote poetry and recorded folk poems, proverbs and sayings. She collaborated with ethnographers like Slava Kovač and Kata Jajnčerova in her folk collecting.

During King Alexander I of Yugoslavia's royal dictatorship (1929–1931), Matočec withdrew from public appearances due to fear of political persecution.

In 1935, Matočec met Croatian journalist Marija Jurić Zagorka while visiting Zagreb. Zagorka was impressed with Matočec as a peasant writer and published articles about her in the women's magazine Ženski list (Women's paper). Due to her friendship with Zagorka, Matočec's writing was published in journals in Bosnia, Croatia and Slovenia and some of her work was translated.

In 1937, Matočec went on a trip to Bosnia to promote the peasant movement and encourage local women to get involved in public activism. She visited the districts of Derventa, Doboj and Tuzla. She was impressed with Bosniak hospitality and Islamic culture and wrote a poem about this in 1939.

Matočec retired from political activism in 1945, but continued writing until her death. Her writing in this period contained the themes of anti-centralism, anti-communism, anti-fascism as well as a promotion of democratic agrarianism.

Matočec died on 8 May 1967 in Korija, Socialist Republic of Croatia, Yugoslavia, aged 81. She was buried in the City Cemetery in Virovitica.

== Legacy ==
A documentary was made about Matočec's life and work by Nada Prkačin in 2011. Two books have been written about her by Mira Kolar-Dimitrijević and Vlatko Smiljanić.

A collection of Matočec's written works was published in commemoration of the 50th anniversary of her death.
