= High-speed rail in Croatia =

There is no high-speed rail network in Croatia as of November 2025. As part of the European Commission's High-Speed Rail Action Plan, Zagreb should be connected to Budapest by 2040.

== Zagreb–Rijeka lowland railway ==
With the highway construction programme in its final stages, the Croatian Parliament passed a bill to build the country's first high-speed rail line between Botovo, Zagreb, and Rijeka. The estimated 9.2 billion kuna ($1.6bn) project would have modernized the existing Botovo–Zagreb line and constructed a new line between Zagreb and Rijeka. While the line would ultimately have had a maximum speed of 250 kilometres per hour (160 mph), it would have initially been limited to 200 km/h (120 mph) due to limitations of the signaling system. Beginning of construction was planned for 2007 with a deadline of 5 to 6 years. The project was cancelled by the government in 2012.

In September 2025, the Zagreb–Rijeka lowland railway was deemed acceptable by an environmental impact assessment. As part of that project, two lines supporting 160 km/h speeds totaling 111 km are planned for construction. The entire project should be finished by 2036. This project is sometimes referred to as "high-efficiency" or "high-speed" railway.

== Possible expansion ==
The Pan-European Corridor X, running from the Slovenian border, through Zagreb, to Serbian border is a likely future candidate for the high-speed extension to this line. It is the most modern Croatian line, capable of 160 km/h (100 mph), fully electrified, and connects most branch lines in Croatia, the Croatian cities of Slavonski Brod and Vinkovci, and the Pan-European Corridor Vc towards Osijek and Bosnia and Herzegovina.
