= Henrik Lundberg =

Henrik Lundberg may refer to:

- Henrik Lundberg (ice hockey forward) (born 1991), Swedish ice hockey forward
- Henrik Lundberg (ice hockey goaltender) (born 1991), Swedish ice hockey goaltender
