= Uskovnica =

- Alpine pasture
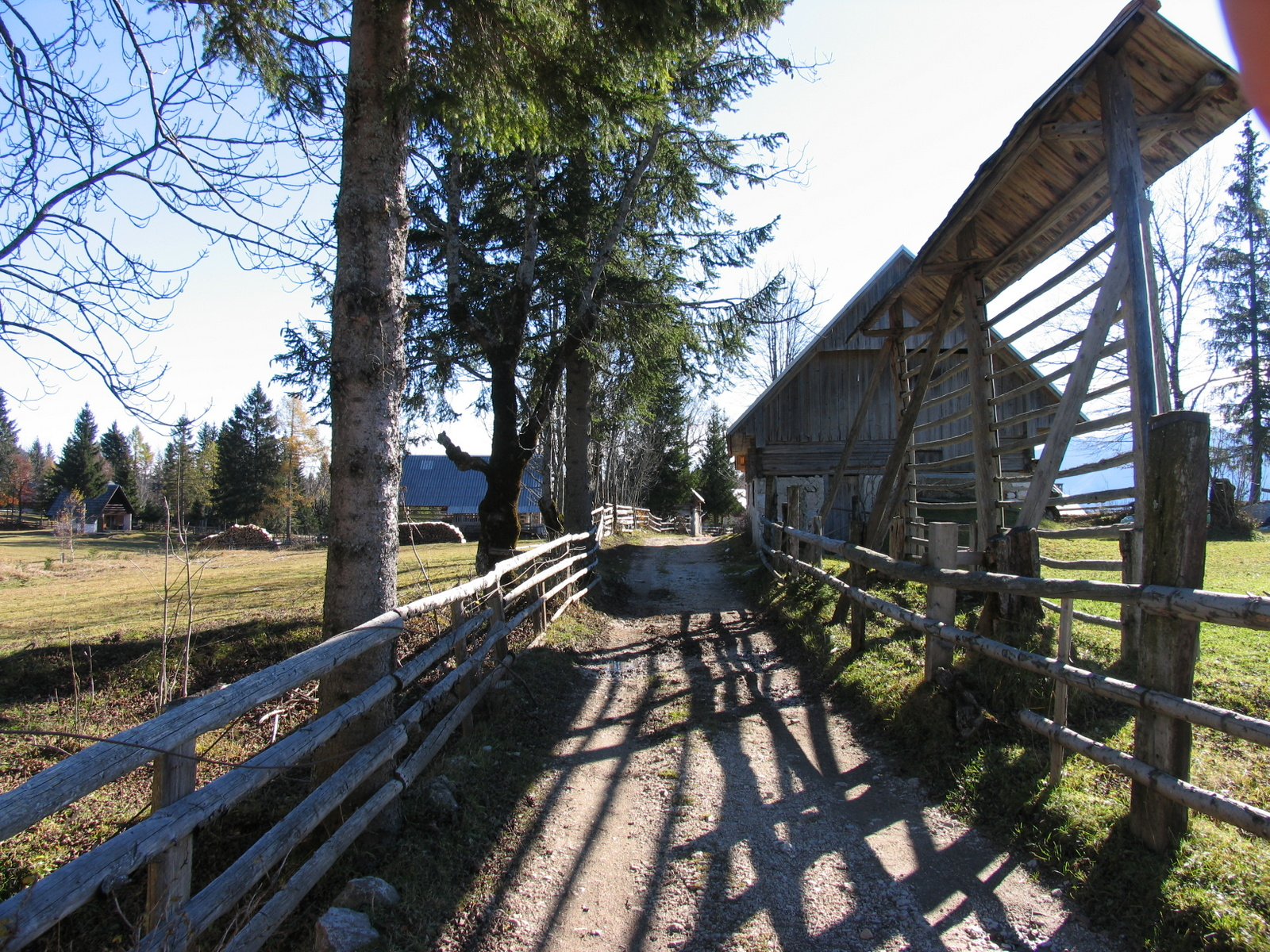
- Uskovnica

- Location within Slovenia
- Coordinates: 46°19′21″N 13°54′26″E
- Country: Slovenia
- Region: Upper Carniola
- Municipality: Bohinj
- Elevation: 1,136 m (3,727 ft)
- Time zone: UTC+01 (CET)
  - Summer (DST): UTC+02 (CEST)

Uskovnica is an Alpine pasture on the Pokljuka Plateau in the Bohinj area belonging to the village of Srednja Vas v Bohinju. The majority of the pasture's cottages are now used as vacation and tourist facilities.

== History ==
Uskovnica was first mentioned in written sources in 1489. The name has probably a phytonymic origin. The pasture was known to tourists in the 19th century as a point on the path to Mount Triglav. A number of Slovene fiction works use Uskovnica as a setting. Before World War II, there was a hotel.

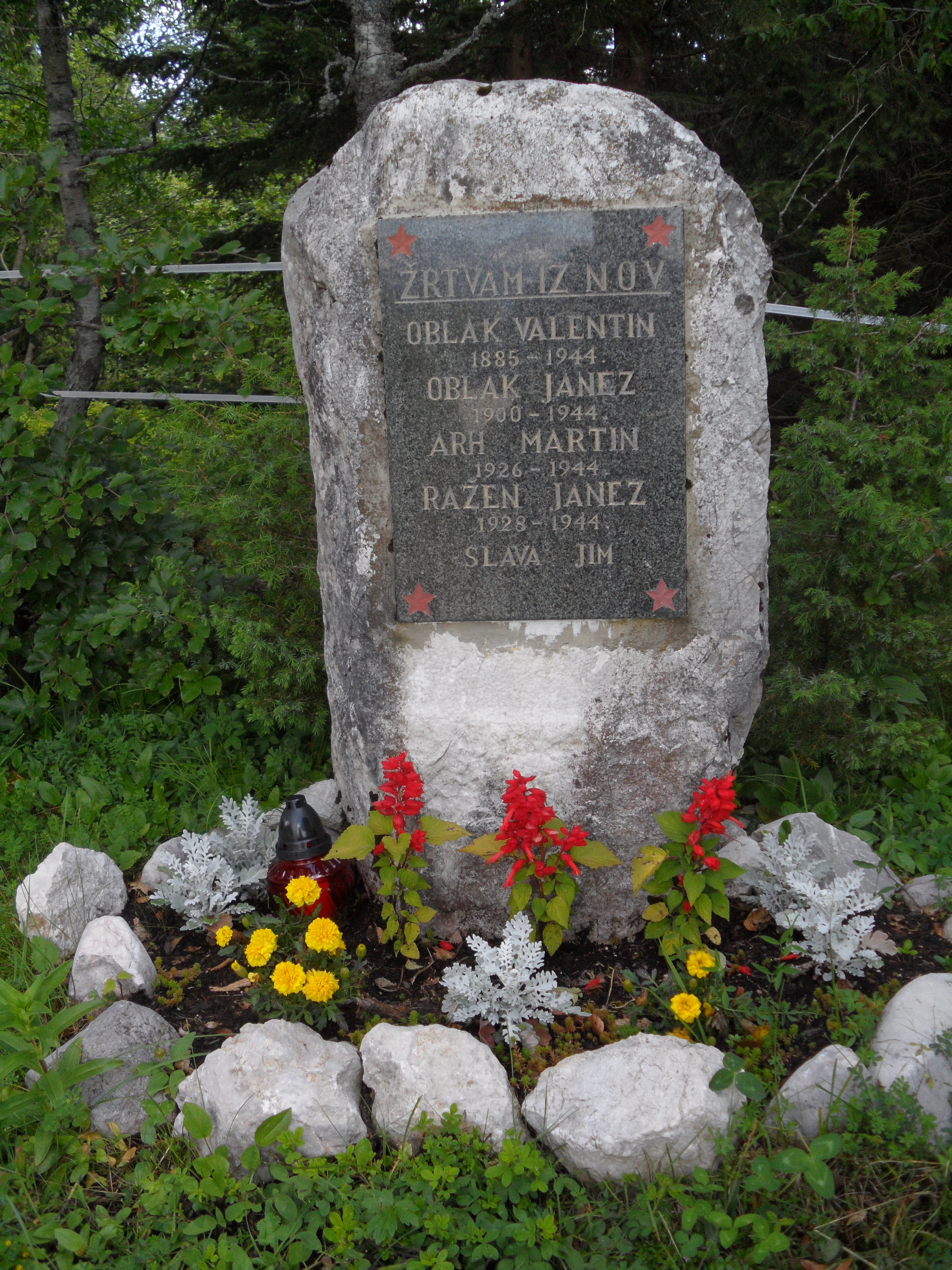
Monument to the victims of Nazi aggression on Uskovnica, Geopedia

On November 11, 1944, 500 Germans attacked the Jesenice-Bohinj Partisan troops stationed at Uskovnica. The Partisans escaped after a short engagement. Janez Oblak (age 44), who lived at Uskovnica, was shot by German soldiers at the entrance to his house and thrown into the flames. A monument to four victims killed at Uskovnica has been installed close to the abandoned cheesery. German troops burned 150 cottages, stalls, and haybarns at Uskovnica, and they took away 40 cows and oxen.

== Tourism ==
After World War II, Uskovnica was rebuilt. Some urban people bought ruins where they built summer cottages. The mountaineering association of Bohinj built a mountain lodge in 1955. It has two dining rooms that can seat 100 people, 46 beds in 16 rooms, and an additional 28 beds in the cheesery adjacent to the lodge. The lodge location: 46°19′13.91″N 13°54′33.98″E

Uskovnica is a starting point for the following tours:

Summits

- Veliki Draški vrh (2243 m), 3h 30 hribi.net
- Viševnik (2050 m), 3h hribi.net
- Tosc (2275 m), 4h hribi.net

Mountain lodges

- Blejska koča na Lipanci (1630 m), 4h hribi.net
- Vodnikov dom na Velem polju (1817 m) 3h hribi.net; additional 4 hour are needed to get to Triglav (2864 m)
- Planinska koča na Vojah (690 m), 1h 30 hribi.net
- Zajamniki pasture (1280 m), 1h 15 hribi.net
- hotel Šport, Goreljek pasture (1250 m) hribi.net via Rudno polje 2h 30
- mountain biking tour: Srednja vas-Uskovnica-Rudno polje-Gorjuše-Koprivnik-Češnjica-Srednja vas

Access by car

- from Srednja vas (8 km dust-road, badly maintained at the end, parking place 15 minutes away from the guest house)
- from Rudno polje (3 km of bad dust-road, parking place 15 minutes away from the guest house).
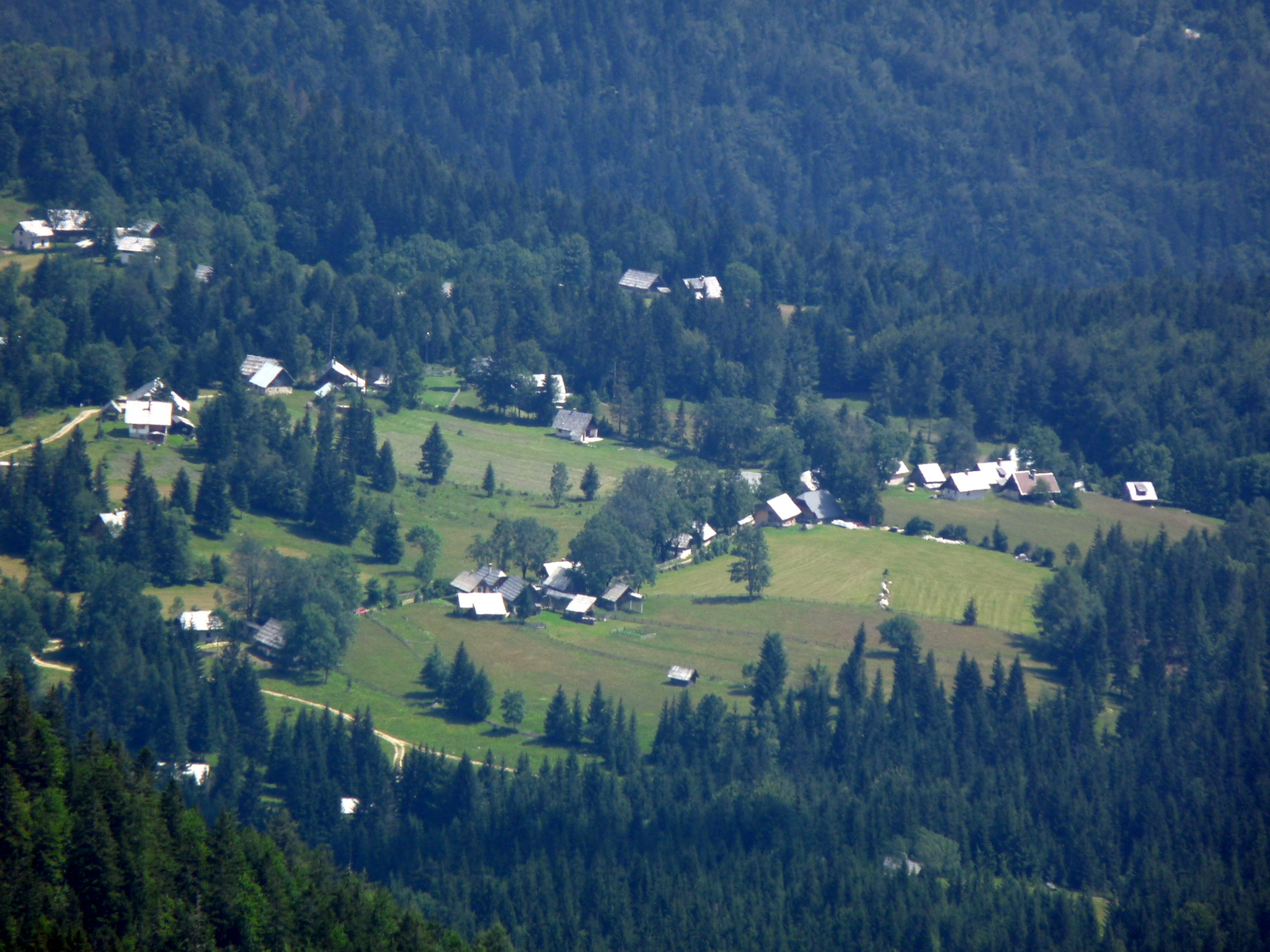

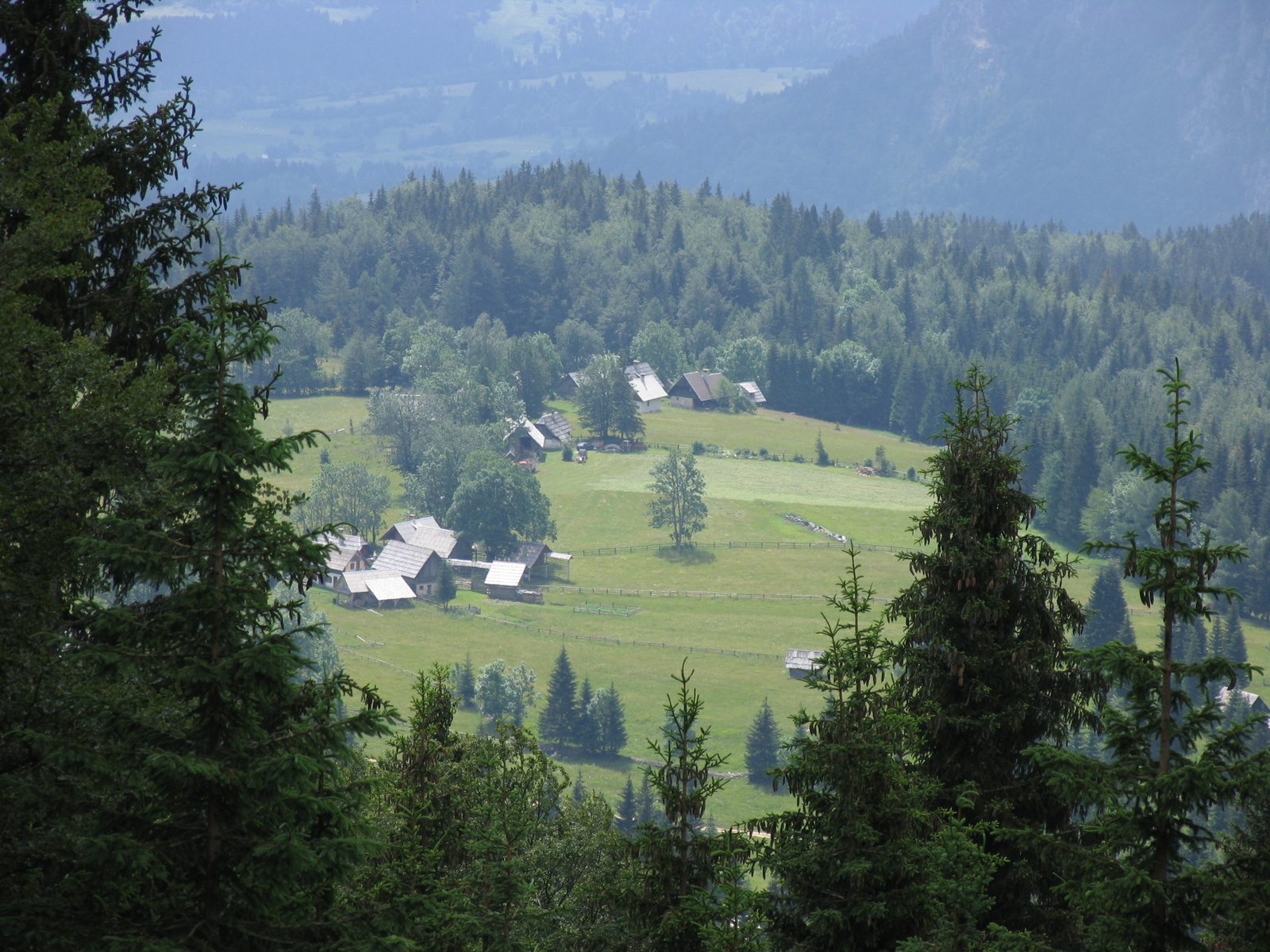

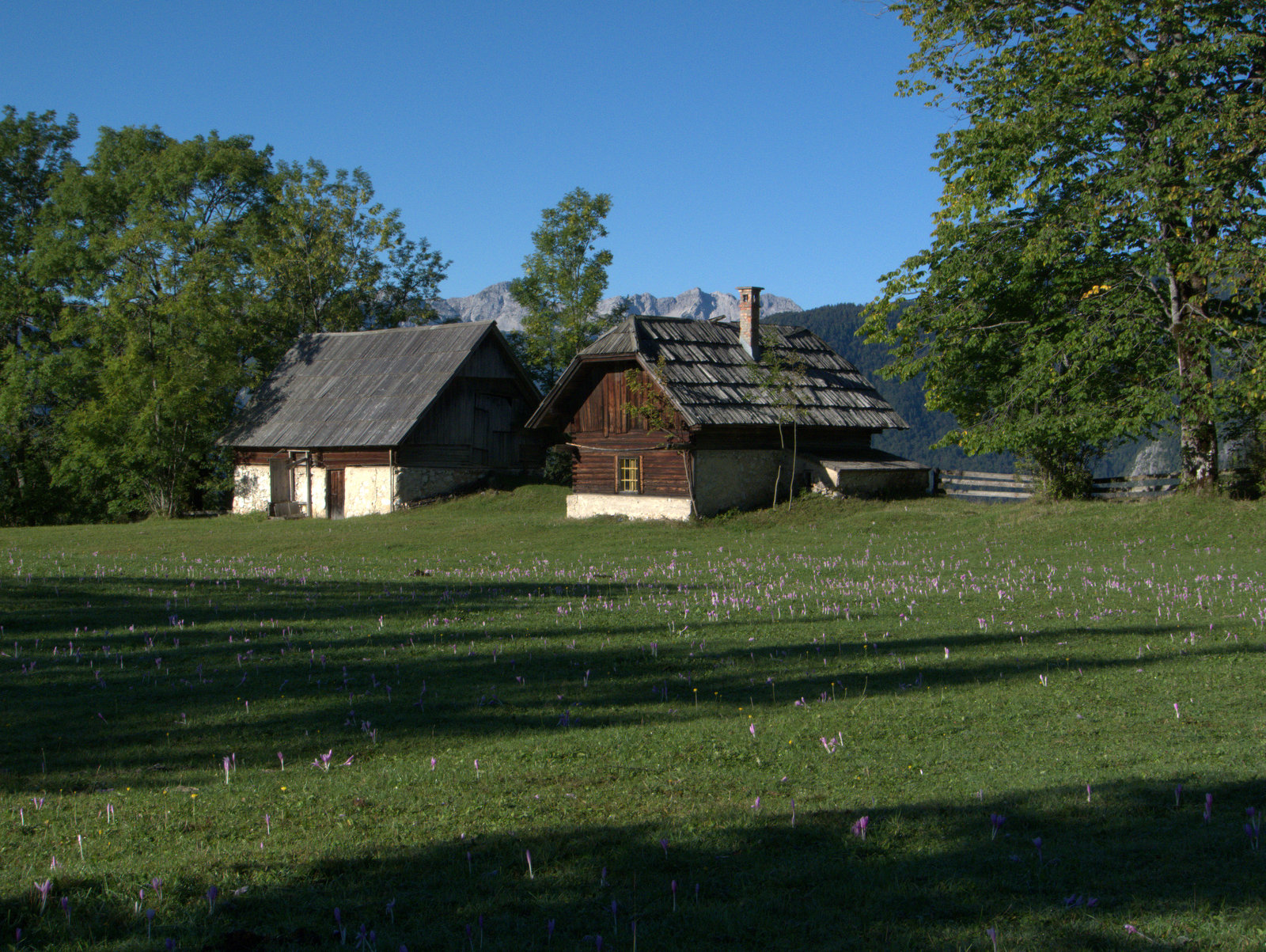

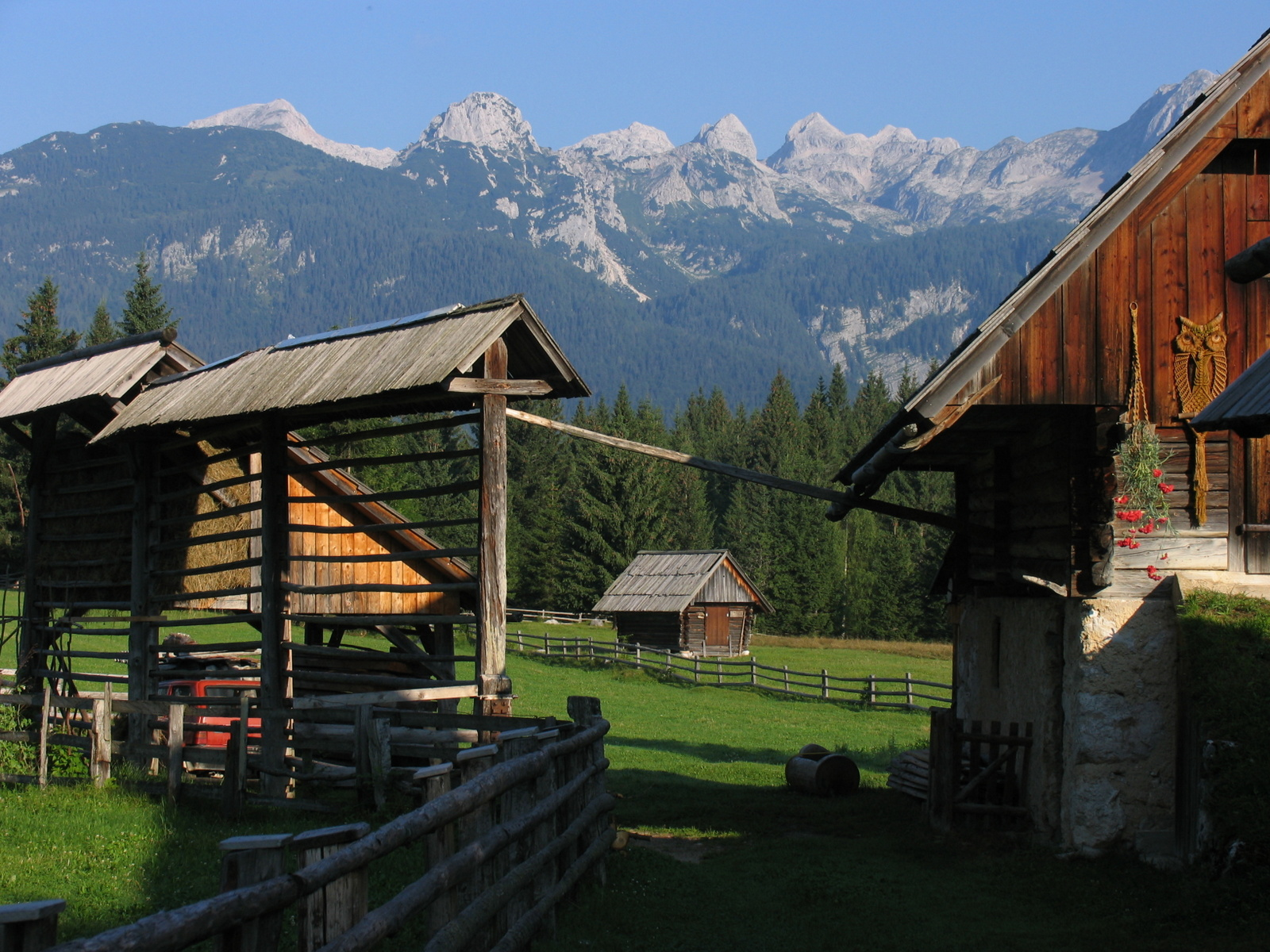

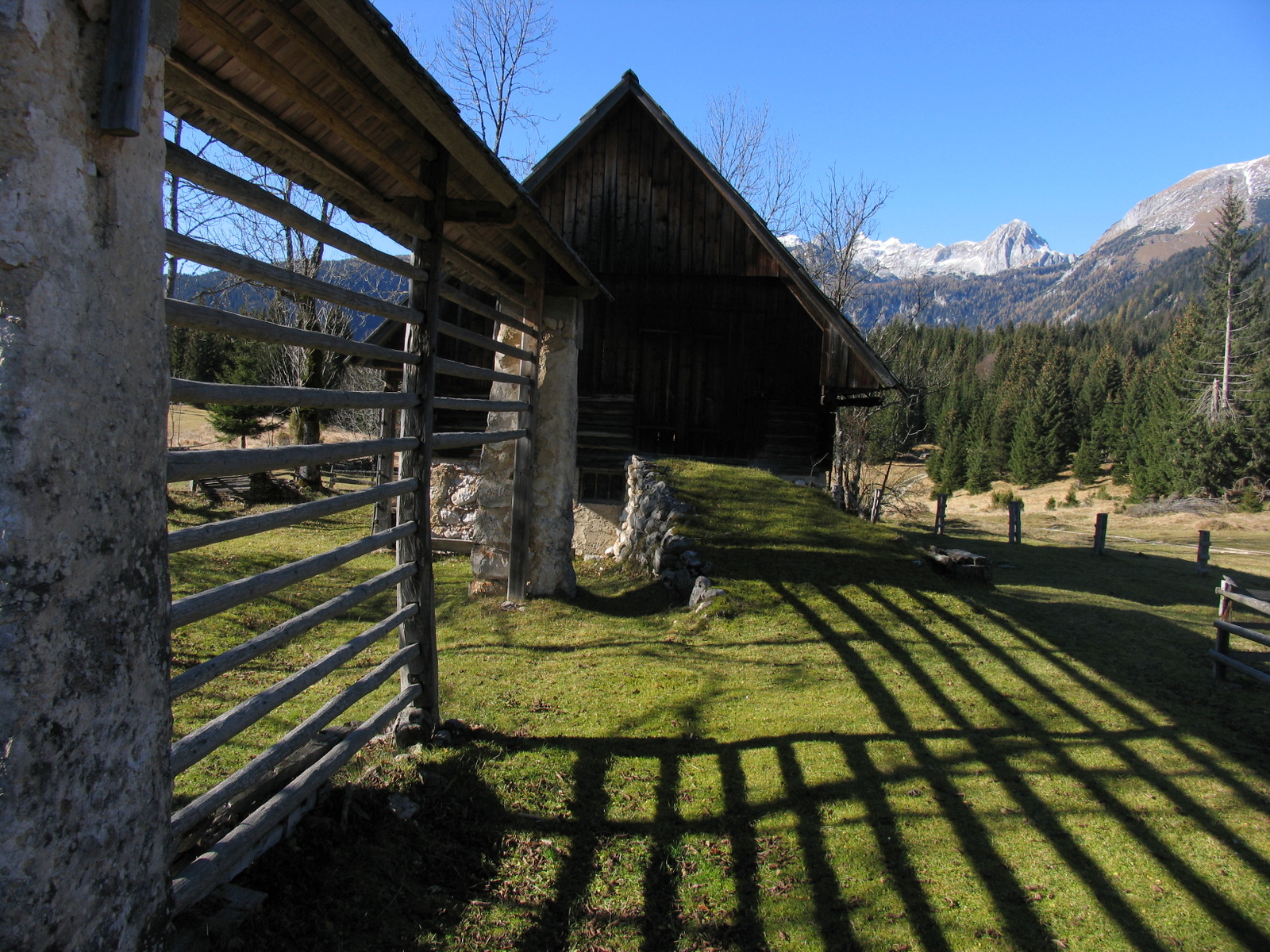
