= Katherine F. Lenroot =

American feminist and child welfare advocate

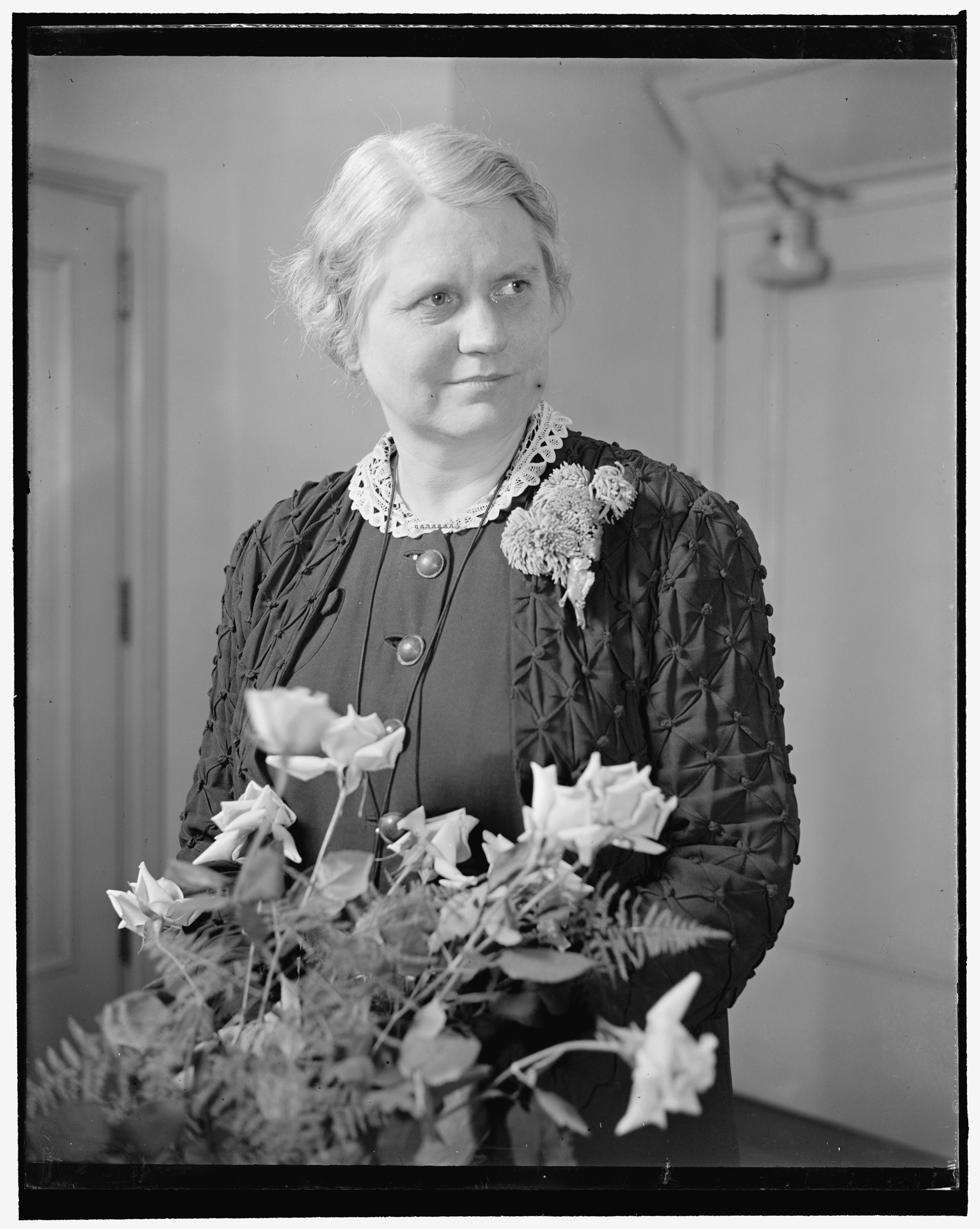
- Born: 8 March 1891; Superior
- Died: 10 February 1982; Milwaukee
- Parents: Irvine Lenroot (father); Clara Clough Lenroot (mother)

Katharine Fredrica Lenroot (March 8, 1891 – February 10, 1982), an American feminist and child welfare advocate, was the third Chief of the United States Children's Bureau.

== Biography ==
Katharine F. Lenroot was born in Superior, Wisconsin, on March 8, 1891, to lawyer and Senator Irvine Lenroot and his wife, memoirist Clara Clough. Lenroot grew up in Madison while her father served there. She attended Superior State Normal School finishing in 1909. Instead of going straight into college Lenroot joined her father in Washington D.C. Her experience there led her to study economics and sociology in the University of Wisconsin–Madison.

Lenroot completed her bachelor's degree in 1912 and began work in the civil service as deputy of the Industrial Commission of Wisconsin in 1913. There she was hired to assist Emma Octavia Lundberg. The two joined the United States Children's Bureau in 1914. They wrote several works together and worked in conjunction with each other especially with regard to children and illegitimacy.

Lenroot remained in the bureau; when Grace Abbott retired in 1934 Lenroot became the third Chief of the Bureau. She remained in the role until 1951. In July 1946 the department moved from the Department of Labor to the Federal Security Agency. Lenroot was president of the Pan-American Child Congress, in 1942, and represented the US on the board of UNICEF from 1947 to 1951.

Lenroot retired in 1951 and was awarded the Federal Security Agency Distinguished Civilian Service Award. During her career she had been awarded the Rosenberg Medal from the University of Chicago in 1942, the National Institute of Social Sciences Gold Medal in 1947 and the Survey Award in 1950. She also received honorary doctorates from University of Wisconsin, Russell Sage College, Tulane University, Western Reserve University, and Boston University.

Lenroot moved to Hartsdale, New York on retirement and lived with Emma Lundberg, until 1954 when Lundberg died. She moved to Princeton, New Jersey in 1960 and worked with the New Jersey State Board of Child Welfare as well as working with the Rutgers University's School of Social Work. She was a consultant for UNICEF from 1962 to 1963. She died in Milwaukee on February 10, 1982.

== Bibliography ==
- Child Welfare Problem (1920, 1922)
- Juvenile Courts at Work (1925)
