= Šoderica =

Lake in Croatia

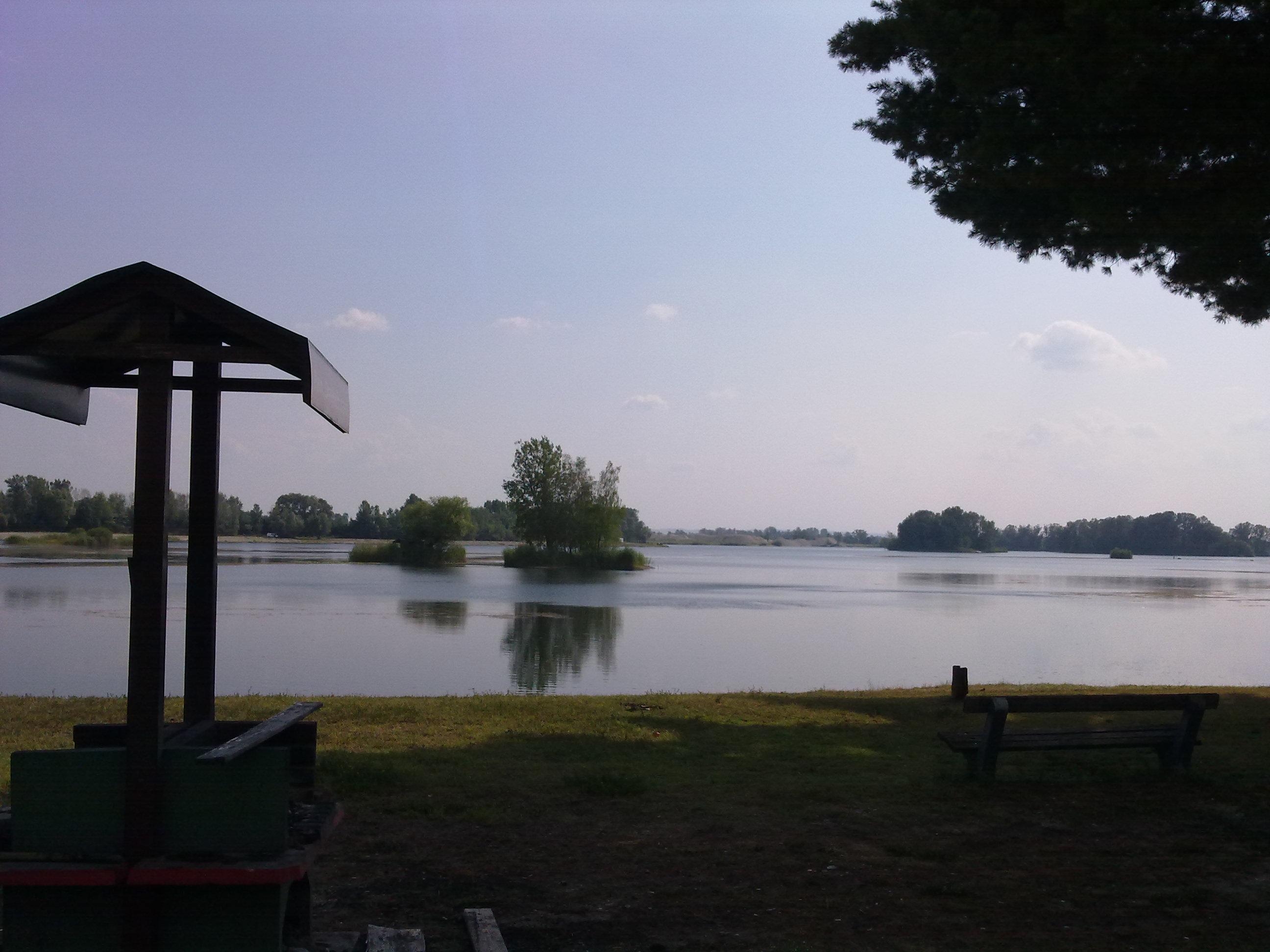

- Location within Croatia
- Location: Koprivnica-Križevci County, Croatia
- Coordinates: 46°14′16″N 16°54′57″E

Šoderica is a lake in northern Croatia, formed by the river Drava, near Drnje, Botovo, and Đelekovec in Koprivnica-Križevci County.
