= International Police Organization =

Non-profit organization

- Abbreviation: IPO
- Formation: 2018
- Legal status: International non-profit organization
- Executive President: Mareglen Tomori
- Website: https://www.interpolice.org/

International Police Organization (IPO) is an international non-governmental organization. The organization is not affiliated with government police organizations, and is connected to government, far-right and criminal groups in Serbia. The organization has held conferences on security topics, and contributed to aid efforts following flooding in Slovenia in 2023.

== Activities ==
The International Police Organization, along with other similarly named groups present a "simulation of civil society" as right wing para-police organizations aimed at recruiting young men, linked to the Serbian Progressive Party. The organization presents itself as a professional security organization, and played a significant role in providing humanitarian aid following the 2023 Slovenia floods. It is not affiliated to any official police organizations, but maintains ties with the far-right and criminal groups in Serbia, as well as with the government of Slovenia. It has organized conferences on security topics.

Mareglan Tomori is the organization's executive president. Ilija Životić served as the organization's first president and is the honorary president.

== Chapters ==
The organization has chapters in thirteen countries including Italy, Greece, Pakistan, Kenya, Montenegro, Serbia, Albania, Slovenia, Bosnia and Herzegovina, and Romania.
