= Countess Olga of Pückler-Limpurg =

German Countess (1873–1966)

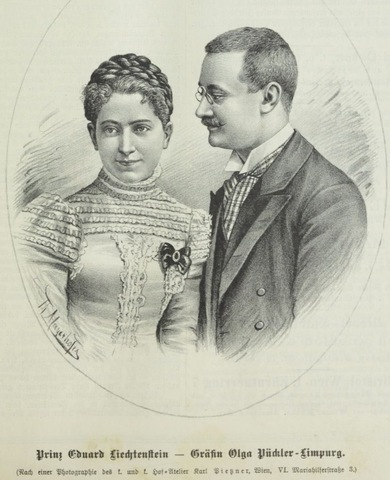
- Countess Olga with her husband, 1898.
- Born: 11 April 1873; Stuttgart, German Empire
- Died: 14 February 1966 (aged 92); Salzburg, Austria
- Spouse: Prince Eduard of Liechtenstein (m. 1898)
- Issue: Prince Johannes of Liechtenstein Prince Ferdinand of Liechtenstein; Princess Ludovika; Princess Eduarda Princess Marie
Names
- Olga Gräfin von Puckler und Limpurg
- Father: Friedrich Graf von Pückler-Limpurg
- Mother: Marie von Spiegel zum Diesenberg-Hanxleden

Countess Olga of Pückler-Limpurg (Olga Gräfin von Puckler und Limpurg; 11 April 1873 – 14 February 1966) was a German Countess and the wife of Prince Eduard of Liechtenstein.

== Family and issue ==
Countess Olga of Pückler-Limpurg was born on 11 April 1873 in Stuttgart. She was the daughter of Friedrich Graf von Pückler-Limpurg and Marie von Spiegel zum Diesenberg-Hanxleden. She died on 14 February 1966 in Salzburg.

She married Prince Eduard of Liechtenstein (2 September 1872 – 8 March 1951) on 31 August 1898 in Višňové.

They had five children:

- Prince Johannes of Liechtenstein (18 October 1899 – 5 November 1979)
- Prince Ferdinand of Liechtenstein (18 January 1901 – 7 July 1981), two children
- Princess Ludovika (18 August 1902 – 19 January 1903)
- Princess Eduarda (16 October 1903 – 13 July 2001), six children
- Princess Marie (2 May 1905 – 5 March 1995), three children
