= Prince Eduard of Liechtenstein =

Austrian-Liechtensteiner noble and diplomat (1872–1951)

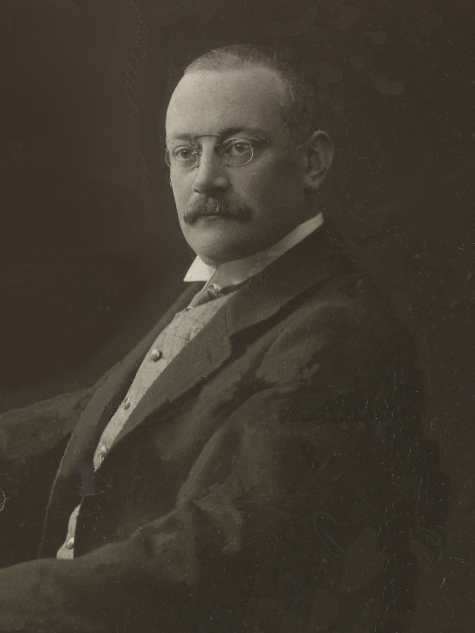
- Born: 2 September 1872; Ljubljana, Austria-Hungary (now Slovenia)
- Died: 8 March 1951 (aged 78); Monte Carlo, Monaco
- Spouse: Countess Olga of Pückler-Limpurg (m. 1898)
- Issue: Prince Johannes of Liechtenstein; Prince Ferdinand of Liechtenstein; Princess Ludovika; Princess Eduarda; Princess Marie
Names
- Eduard Viktor Maria
- House: Liechtenstein
- Father: Prince Alois of Liechtenstein
- Mother: Countess Anna of Degenfeld-Schonburg

Prince Eduard of Liechtenstein (Eduard Viktor Maria; 2 September 1872 – 8 March 1951) was the son of Prince Alois of Liechtenstein and Countess Anna of Degenfeld-Schonburg. He was a civil servant in Austria and a prominent diplomat in Liechtenstein.

== Early life ==
Eduard was born on 2 September 1872 in Ljubljana (now in Slovenia) as the second son of Prince Alois of Liechtenstein and Countess Anna Gräfin of Degenfeld-Schonburg. He was the grandson of Prince Eduard Franz of Liechtenstein, brother of Aloys II, Prince of Liechtenstein.

He spent his early childhood in Berlin and from 1881 to 1891 attended high school in Vienna and Kalksburg. Until 1898 he studied law in University of Vienna, Freiburg, Graz and Innsbruck respectively, where he received a diploma.

== Career ==
In 1897 Eduard entered the Austrian administrative service, which he served in the state of Salzburg and also as district captain of Mariánské Lázně. In addition, he worked in the Austrian Ministry of the Interior. There we plans for him to be appointed mayor of Salzburg in 1913, but this did not see through. In the wake of the beginning of World War I he was appointed to manage the war relief office, where is commitment to humanitarian issues led him to being appointed to the Ministry of Social Welfare in 1918. He held contact with Leopold Freiherr von Imhof which led to him being appointed Governor of Liechtenstein in 1914. On 26 May 1918, he left the civil service and became president of the General Pension Fund for Employees and board member of the Allgemeine Bodencreditanstalt until the end of 1918.

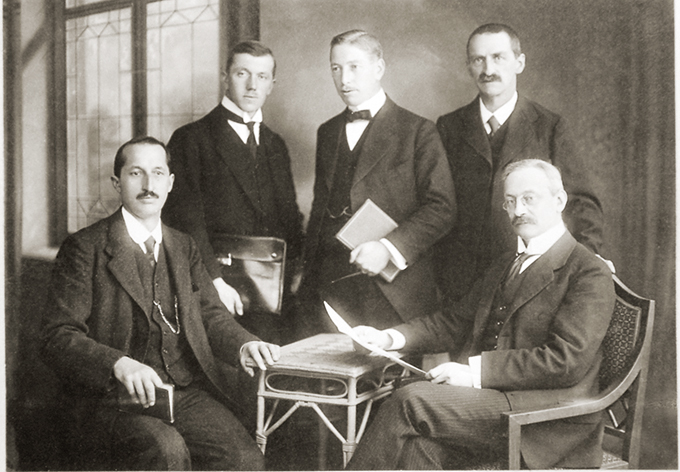
Eduard (bottom-right) as part of the Liechtenstein delegation for custom union negotiations with Switzerland, 1920

He accepted Liechtensteiner citizenship and from 1919 to 1921 was Chargé d'affaires in the Liechtenstein legation in Vienna, which was established upon his recommendation. His official duties were overshadowed by ongoing conflicts within Liechtenstein's politics, particularly ones led by Wilhelm Beck and the country's constitutional revision. He wanted the legation to lead the country's foreign policy, against the desire of the Christian-Social People's Party. His efforts to have the country join the League of Nations were unsuccessful, with Switzerland being the only country to vote in favour of their ascension at the League of Nations Assembly on 17 December 1920, as opposed to 28 against. In 1923, due to the Christian-Social People's Party now being in power, the Liechtenstein legation in Vienna was closed.

Eduard played a key role in negotiations between Liechtenstein and Switzerland for forming closer economic ties, which cultivated in a customs union being formed between the two countries in 1924. Though he was personally criticized by political figures such as Ferdinand Nigg in the Liechtensteiner Vaterland.

He went on to live a private life and died on 8 March 1951 in Monte Carlo, Monaco. He was buried in the Liechtenstein Princely Tomb in Vaduz.

== Personal life ==
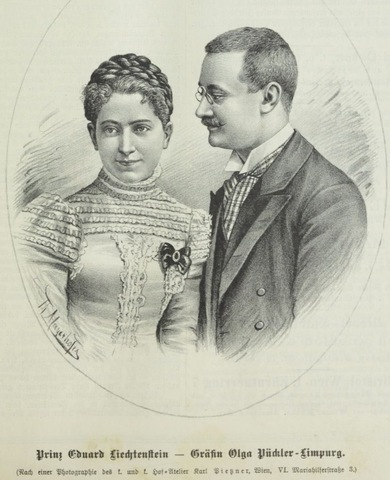
Prince Eduard with his wife, Countess Olga of Pückler-Limpurg in 1898

Eduard married Countess Olga of Pückler-Limpurg (11 April 1873 – 14 February 1966) on 31 August 1898 in Višňové.

They had five children:

- Prince Johannes of Liechtenstein (18 October 1899 – 5 November 1979)
- Prince Ferdinand of Liechtenstein (18 January 1901 – 7 July 1981), two children.
- Princess Ludovika (18 August 1902 – 19 January 1903)
- Princess Eduarda (16 October 1903 – 13 July 2001), six children.
- Princess Marie (2 May 1905 – 5 March 1995), three children.

== Honours ==
- Austria-Hungary:
  - Order of the Iron Crown
  - War Cross for Civil Merits
  - Order of Franz Joseph (1918)
- Holy See: Knights Grand Cross of the Order of St Gregory the Great Order of St. Gregory the Great (1913)
- United Kingdom: Knights Commander of the Royal Victorian Order (3 September 1908)
