= Prince Johannes of Liechtenstein (1899–1979) =

Prince Johannes Baptist
- Born: 18 October 1899; Salzburg
- Died: 5 November 1979 (aged 80); Honolulu, Hawaii
- Spouse: Aleene McFarland (m. 1931; div. 1944) Jean Ann French (m. 1945)
Names
- Johannes Baptist Alois Ferdinand Lucas Anton Joseph Maria
- House: Liechtenstein
- Father: Prince Eduard of Liechtenstein
- Mother: Countess Olga of Pückler-Limpurg

Prince Johannes Baptist Alois Ferdinand Lucas Anton Joseph Maria of Liechtenstein (18 October 1899 – 5 November 1979) was a Prince of the House of Liechtenstein and nephew of Franz I, Prince of Liechtenstein and cousin of Franz Joseph II, Prince of Liechtenstein. Prince Johannes married two Americans and became a rancher.

== Early life ==
Prince Johannes was born in Salzburg on 18 October 1899. He was the eldest son of Prince Eduard Viktor Maria (1872–1951) and his wife Olga, Gräfin von Pückler und Limpurg (1873–1966). His younger brother, Prince Ferdinand, was an Olympic athlete for Austria and married four times, including to American heiress Dorothy (née Haydel) Oelrichs, of St. Louis, Missouri, was the widow of Hermann Oelrichs Jr. (the only child of Hermann Oelrichs and Theresa Fair Oelrichs).

His paternal grandparents were Prince Eduard Franz (a son of Johann I Joseph and Landgravine Josepha of Fürstenberg-Weitra) and his wife Honoria, Hrabina Choloniowa-Choloniewska.

Prince Johannes was educated by tutors until, at age 12, he was sent to a Jesuit school near Vienna. During World War I, he ran away from school and joined the Imperial Austrian Navy, serving for four years. After the War, he studied agriculture and worked at a German bank in Paris.

== Career ==
After his 1931 marriage, he moved to America, where he became a farmer in Texas and was quoted as saying America was a land of "genuine business opportunity, which strangely blends the practical and romantic spirits". He later moved to Scottsdale, Arizona, where he established the first air conditioned commercial chicken ranch in the state. While in Scottsdale, he operated "The Prince's Pantry", a specialty store that sold "kitchen wares, wines and fancy foods imported from Europe". In 1969, the Liechtensteins moved to Honolulu, Hawaii, where he was affiliated with Earl Thacker Co. Ltd. and, for a time, he kept the books for Clare Boothe Luce before retiring from business.

In 1933, he sailed aboard the North German Lloyd liner Bremen from New York for Europe alongside John Hay Whitney (and his wife Liz Whitney), Baron George von Zedlitz, F. Herman Gade, Norwegian Minister to France, and Heinrich Schlusnus, the German concert tenor. In 1934, the Prince and his wife were the dinner guests of Capt. Karl G. Nischk in the roof garden of the Hotel Astor in New York City along with Baroness Eleanore Eckhardt, Mrs. Maria von der Osten, Miss Yvonne Cartier, Miss Alice von Eschtruth, Miss Aga Gruson, Baron Hans von Hahn, Baron Ferdinand van der Noot, Commodore A. Ammann von Borowsky, Dr. Gerhardt Wodtke and Hasso von Bismarck.

== Personal life ==
Prince Johannes was married twice. In 1925, he met Elizabeth "Betty" Bates Volck at a party at the Ritz in Paris. A daughter of the former Lillian Beaverstock and Adelbert George Volck (1886–1974), who worked in the film industry as Hollywood agent, she was a granddaughter of Elizabeth Bates Volck (later known as Madame Domício da Gama), the widow of the Brazil's ambassador to the United States, and the great-granddaughter of the political caricaturist Adalbert J. Volck. Their engagement was announced in 1926 when he was twenty-six and she was seventeen. Shortly after the announcement, Prince Johannes denied they were ever engaged. They did not marry and Betty eventually committed suicide in November 1931.

On 29 July 1931, he married morganatically Aleene McFarland (1902–1983) in London. Aleene was born in Parker County, Texas, and was the daughter of Charles McFarland, a cattle baron, and Eloise (née McAfee) McFarland. A year after their marriage, Prince Johannes' kinsman, Franz I, the reigning Prince of Liechtenstein, bestowed the titles of Count and Countess of Schellenberg on the children who may be born of the marriage. However, they divorced without issue in 1943. In the divorce, he received $875, a light truck and the crown silverware of Liechtenstein, which he inherited from his grandmother.

On 27 August 1945, Prince Johannes married morganatically Jean Ann French (1917–2005), a former golf champion, in St. Johns, Arizona. Jean was born in Des Moines, Iowa. In 1948, he became an American citizen, at which time he renounced his title as a Prince of Liechtenstein.

Prince Johannes died on Honolulu on 5 November 1979. His first wife died in Lubbock, Texas, on 10 March 1983, and his widow died on 28 July 2005, also in Honolulu.
