= Korija =

Coordinates: 45°51′24″N 17°19′06″E

- Village
- Interactive map of Korija
- Country: Croatia
- County: Virovitica-Podravina County
- Town: Virovitica

Area
  - Total: 15.5 km^{2} (6.0 sq mi)

Population (2021)
  - Total: 648
  - Density: 41.8/km^{2} (108/sq mi)
- Time zone: UTC+1 (CET)
  - Summer (DST): UTC+2 (CEST)

Korija is a village in Croatia. It is connected by the D2 highway.
