= Veliki Draški vrh =

Mountain in Slovenia

Coordinates: 46°21′37″N 13°52′33″E

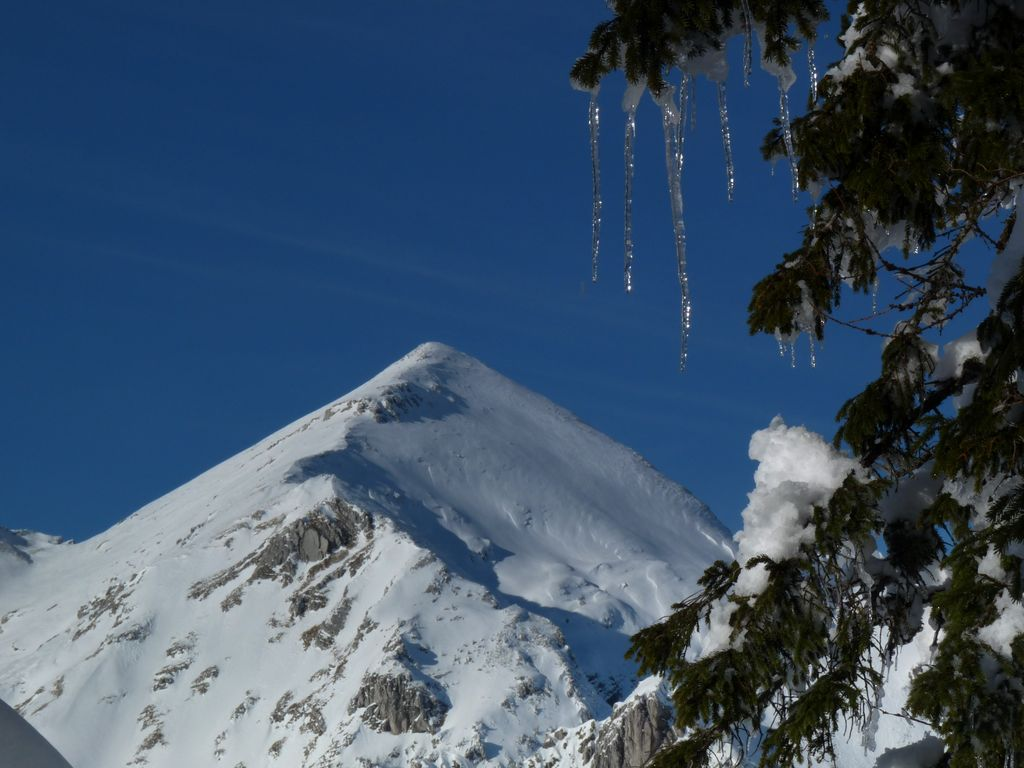
Veliki Draški vrh in 2014

Veliki Draški vrh is a mountain in Slovenia.

== History ==
In the August 2023 floods in North and Central Slovenia, two Dutch men, aged 52 and 20, who had hiked to Mount Veliki Draški vrh, were killed.
