= Charles Lundberg Three-Decker =

- U.S. National Register of Historic Places
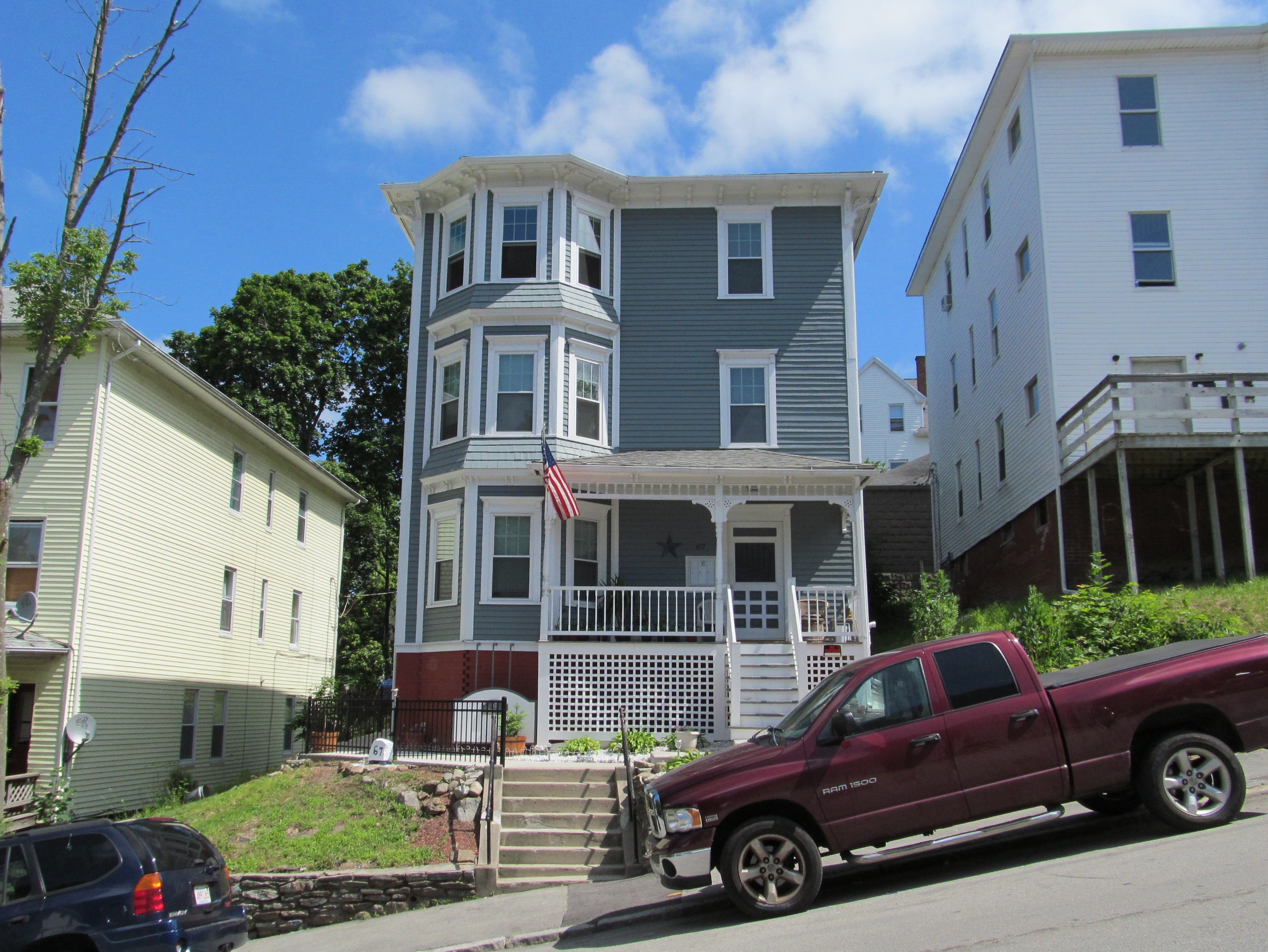
- Charles Lundberg Three Decker

- Location within Massachusetts Location within the United States
- Location: 67 Catharine St., Worcester, Massachusetts
- Coordinates: 42°16′27″N 71°47′16″W
- Area: less than one acre
- Built: c. 1892
- Architectural style: Queen Anne
- MPS: Worcester Three-Deckers TR
- NRHP reference No.: 89002399
- Added to NRHP: February 9, 1990

The Charles Lundberg Three-Decker is a historic triple decker house in Worcester, Massachusetts. The house was built c. 1892, and is a well-preserved local example of the form with Queen Anne styling. It was listed on the National Register of Historic Places in 1990.

== Description and history ==
The Charles Lundberg Three-Decker is located in a residential area east of downtown Worcester on the north side of Catharine Street west of Rodney Street. It is a three-story wood frame structure, with a hip roof and clapboarded exterior. The building follows a standard side-hall plan, with a flanking polygonal bay. The projecting section has shingled skirt sections between the floors, with small brackets in the resulting overhang. The main roof cornice is deep, with decorative modillion blocks regularly spaced. The front entry is sheltered by a single-story porch which has a spindled frieze and balustrade. It is supported by very slender turned columns with brackets at the upper end, below the frieze. The stairwell windows feature decorative stained glass.

Built about 1892, the house is a good example of early-period three-decker development in Worcester's Belmont Hill area. This area was heavily populated in its early years by immigrants from Sweden and Finland. Charles Lundberg, the first owner, also owned the adjacent houses; he was a clerk. Most of the early residents were of Swedish extraction.

== See also ==
- National Register of Historic Places listings in eastern Worcester, Massachusetts
