= Torčec =

Coordinates: 46°13′N 16°53′E

- Village
- Interactive map of Torčec
- Country: Croatia
- County: Koprivnica-Križevci County

Area
  - Total: 8.0 km^{2} (3.1 sq mi)

Population (2021)
  - Total: 496
  - Density: 62/km^{2} (160/sq mi)
- Time zone: UTC+1 (CET)
  - Summer (DST): UTC+2 (CEST)

Torčec is a village in Croatia. It is connected by the D20 highway.
