= Emma Octavia Lundberg =

Swedish-American child welfare advocate

- Born: October 8, 1881; Tranegärdet, Humle Socken, Västergötland, Sweden
- Died: November 17, 1954 (aged 73); Hartsdale, New York

Emma Octavia Lundberg (October 8, 1881 – November 17, 1954) was a Swedish-American child welfare advocate.

== Biography ==
Lundberg was born in Tranegärdet, Humle Socken, Västergötland, Sweden on October 26, 1881, to Frans Vilhelm Lundberg and Anna Kajsa Johanson. Her family emigrated to Rockford, Illinois, in 1884 where Lundberg went to attend Rockford High School, graduating in 1901. Lundberg then completed both a bachelor's in 1907 and a master's degree in 1908 from the University of Wisconsin before going to work studying the living conditions of immigrant families in cities. She worked for a number of organisations including the Associated Charities in Madison, Wisconsin, and Milwaukee, the United Charities of Chicago and the United States Immigration Commission. By 1913 Lundberg was a deputy at the Wisconsin Industrial Commission before she moved to Washington, D.C., to take over as the first Director of the Social Services Division of the United States Children's Bureau. Katherine F. Lenroot joined the bureau shortly after and the two produced a number of publications together. Lundberg joined the Child Welfare League of America in 1925, resigning from her position in D.C. and became their Director of the Department of Institutional Care and then Director of Studies and Surveys. During the Great Depression Lundberg worked for Governor Franklin Delano Roosevelt as Director of Research and Statistics at the New York Temporary Emergency Relief Administration as well as working as a consultant for a variety of other public agencies.

In 1935 Lundberg returned to the Children's Bureau. Lenroot was now Chief of the Bureau. Lundberg took up the position of Assistant Director of the Child Welfare Division from then until 1942. From that point on she acted as a consultant for social services and in 1945 she retired due to ill health. During her time in positions of influence Lundberg had created the ground work for the children welfare provisions under the Social Security Act of 1937 and taken part as research secretary to the White House Conference on Child Health and Protection and assistant secretary of White House Conference on Children in a Democracy (1940).

When Lenroot retired, she and Lundberg lived together in Hartsdale, New York where Lundberg died on November 17, 1954.

=== Bibliography ===
- Illegitimacy as a Child Welfare Problem (1920, 1922)
- Juvenile Courts at Work (1925)
- Children Deprived of Parental Care (1926)
- Public Aid to Mothers with Dependent Children (1926)
- Child Dependency in the United States (1933)
- Unto the Least of These: Social Services for Children (1947)
