= Emma Lundberg (artist) =

Swedish artist and architect

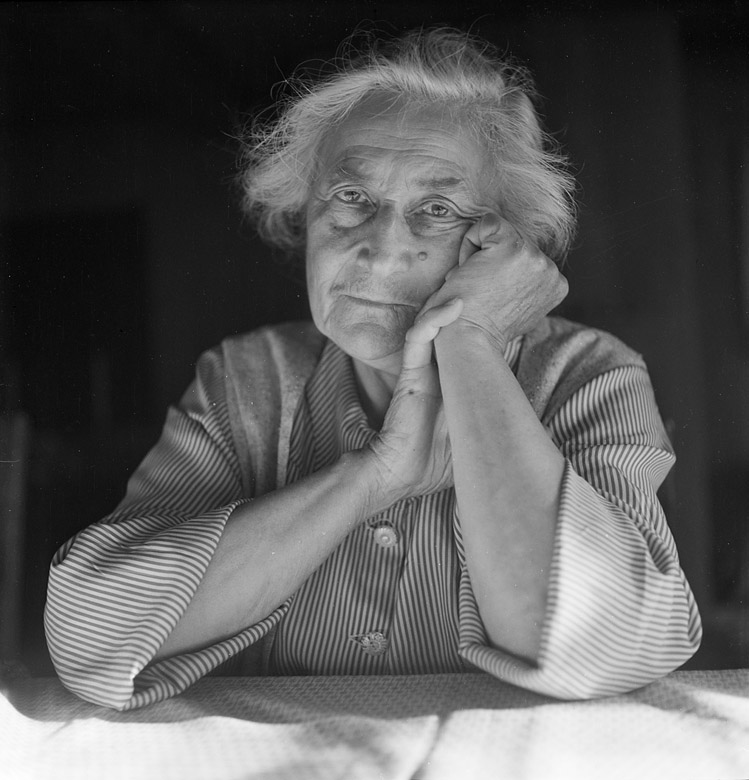
- Born: 13 June 1869; Kristianstad
- Died: 28 August 1953 (aged 84); Lidingö

Emma Lundberg (13 June 1869 – 28 August 1953) was a Swedish artist and architect.

== Biography ==
Emma Lovisa Bong, was born on 13 June 1869 in Kristianstad, Sweden. Her parents were Anders Fredrik Bong and Carolina Cecilia Sjöström. She married Carl Theodor Ansgarius Lundberg. Their children were geophysicist Hans Lundberg, architect Erik Lundberg, businessman Sten Lundberg and artist Barbro Nilsson.

As an artist Lundberg painted her children, her garden and landscapes, typically in watercolor. She was self taught in her interest in garden design. Lundberg moved to Lidingö in 1910 where began considering the garden to be an extra room and worked within her own garden in Lidingö using the fruit trees, hedges and pergolas for structure. She believed the garden should be adapted to the conditions and surrounding nature. She published a book on her Garden in 1932, she later wrote one with her son. Though her ideas were largely forgotten for some years after her death, during 1998 when Stockholm was the European Capital of Culture a garden was opened at Millesgården inspired by her ideas. It was named the Emma Lundberg Garden.

Lundberg died in 1953 and is buried in Lidingö cemetery.

=== Bibliography ===
- Min trädgård. Några akvareller med åtföljande text, 1932
- Svensk trädgård – dess förutsättningar i tradition och natur, 1941.
