= Drnje =

- Municipality
- Interactive map of Drnje
- Location within Croatia
- Coordinates: 46.21°N 16.92°E
- Country: Croatia
- County: Koprivnica-Križevci County

Government
  - Mayor: Matija Dolenec (Grouping of electors)

Area
  - Municipality: 29.7 km^{2} (11.5 sq mi)
  - Urban: 18.4 km^{2} (7.1 sq mi)

Population (2021)
  - Municipality: 1,533
  - Density: 51.6/km^{2} (134/sq mi)
  - Urban: 805
  - Urban density: 43.7/km^{2} (113/sq mi)
- Postal code: 48316 Đelekovec
- Website: drnje.hr

Drnje is a village and a municipality in the Koprivnica-Križevci County in Croatia. In the 2021 Croatian census, there were 1,533 inhabitants in the municipality. Croats form an absolute majority at 97.59%.

== History ==
In the late 19th century and early 20th century, Drnje was part of the Bjelovar-Križevci County of the Kingdom of Croatia-Slavonia.

== Demographics ==
In 2021, the municipality had 1,533 residents in the following settlements:

- Botovo, population 232
- Drnje, population 805
- Torčec, population 496
Drnje: Population trends 1857–2021
v

| population | 2227 | 2322 | 2404 | 2876 | 2717 | 2790 | 2720 | 2808 | 2591 | 2661 | 2633 | 2447 | 2363 | 2244 | 2156 | 1863 | 1533 |
| | 1857 | 1869 | 1880 | 1890 | 1900 | 1910 | 1921 | 1931 | 1948 | 1953 | 1961 | 1971 | 1981 | 1991 | 2001 | 2011 | 2021 |

Sources: Croatian Bureau of Statistics publications

=== Ethnicity and Religion ===
| Ethnicity | Population | % |
|---|---|---|
| Croats | 1,496 | 97.59% |
| Romani | 20 | 1.3% |
| Others | 17 | 1.11% |
| Total | 1,533 | 100% |

| Religion | Population | % |
|---|---|---|
| Catholics | 976 | 63.67% |
| Other Christians | 415 | 27.07% |
| Others | 17 | 1.11% |
| Unaffiliated | 31 | 2.02% |
| Undeclared | 94 | 6.13% |
| Total | 1,533 | 100% |

== Administration ==
The current mayor of Drnje is Matija Dolenec and the Drnje Municipal Council consists of 9 seats.

| Groups | Councilors per group |
| Grouping of electors | 4 / 9 |
| Independents | 4 / 9 |
| HDZ | 1 / 9 |

== Culture ==
There are currently several cultural and sports associations operating in Drnje:

- VFD Torčec
- Association of Croatian Homeland War Volunteers Drnje
- Women's Association "Croatian Heart"
- Torčec Women's Association
- Red Cross Society of Koprivnica

=== Sports ===
- FC "Tomislav" Drnje
- FC "Podravec" Torčec
- Sport Fishing Club "Amur" Drnje - Botovo
- Sport Fishing Club "Pike" Torčec
- Hunting Association "Pheasant" Drnje
- Women's Basketball Club "DHP & GOLA" Drnje

== Education ==
- Kindergarten "Igra"
- Elementary School "Fran Koncelak" Drnje

== Religion ==
There are two catholic churches in Drnje:

- Church of the Nativity of the Blessed Virgin Mary
- Chapel of the Sacred Heart of Jesus in Torčec

== Notable people ==
- Mara Matočec (1885–1967), folk writer and peasant activist
