= Henrik Lundberg (ice hockey forward) =

Swedish ice hockey player

- Born: 21 August 1991 (age 34) Skellefteå, Sweden
- Height: 6 ft 1 in (185 cm)
- Weight: 174 lb (79 kg; 12 st 6 lb)
- Position: Right wing
- Shot: Left
- Played for: Skellefteå AIK; Kiruna IF; Halmstad HF; Piteå HC; SK Lejon; Clemensnäs HC; CCCP HC
- Playing career: 2010–2018

Henrik Lundberg (born 21 August 1991) is a Swedish professional ice hockey player. He played with Skellefteå AIK in the Elitserien during the 2010–11 Elitserien season.

== Career statistics ==
			Regular season					Playoffs
Season	Team	League	GP	G	A	Pts	PIM	GP	G	A	Pts	PIM
2007–08	Skellefteå AIK J18	J18 Elit	15	5	13	18	10	—	—	—	—	—
2007–08	Skellefteå AIK J18	J18 Allsvenskan	14	0	2	2	6	—	—	—	—	—
2008–09	Skellefteå AIK J18	J18 Elit	18	15	22	37	12	—	—	—	—	—
2008–09	Skellefteå AIK J18	J18 Allsvenskan	14	4	6	10	14	9	0	1	1	10
2008–09	Skellefteå AIK J20	J20 SuperElit	1	0	0	0	0	—	—	—	—	—
2009–10	Skellefteå AIK J20	J20 SuperElit	31	10	9	19	16	4	0	0	0	4
2010–11	Skellefteå AIK J20	J20 SuperElit	41	7	10	17	90	5	1	1	2	14
2010–11	Skellefteå AIK	Elitserien	2	0	0	0	0	—	—	—	—	—
2010–11	Kiruna IF	Division 1	2	1	0	1	2	—	—	—	—	—
2011–12	Halmstad HF	Division 1	16	0	3	3	6	—	—	—	—	—
2011–12	Piteå HC	Division 1	18	1	3	4	41	—	—	—	—	—
2012–13	Piteå HC	Hockeyettan	37	6	12	18	30	—	—	—	—	—
2013–14	SK Lejon	Hockeyettan	36	5	10	15	72	—	—	—	—	—
2014–15	Clemensnäs HC	Division 2	18	8	26	34	37	—	—	—	—	—
2015–16	Clemensnäs HC	Division 2	25	8	22	30	20	—	—	—	—	—
2016–17	Clemensnäs HC	Division 2	11	2	13	15	2	—	—	—	—	—
2017–18	CCCP HC	Division 4	1	0	0	0	0	—	—	—	—	—
Elitserien totals			2	0	0	0	0	—	—	—	—	—
Hockeyettan (Division 1) totals			109	13	28	41	151	—	—	—	—	—
Division 2 totals			54	18	61	79	59	—	—	—	—	—
