= Viktring =

Coordinates: 46°35′30″N 14°16′25″E

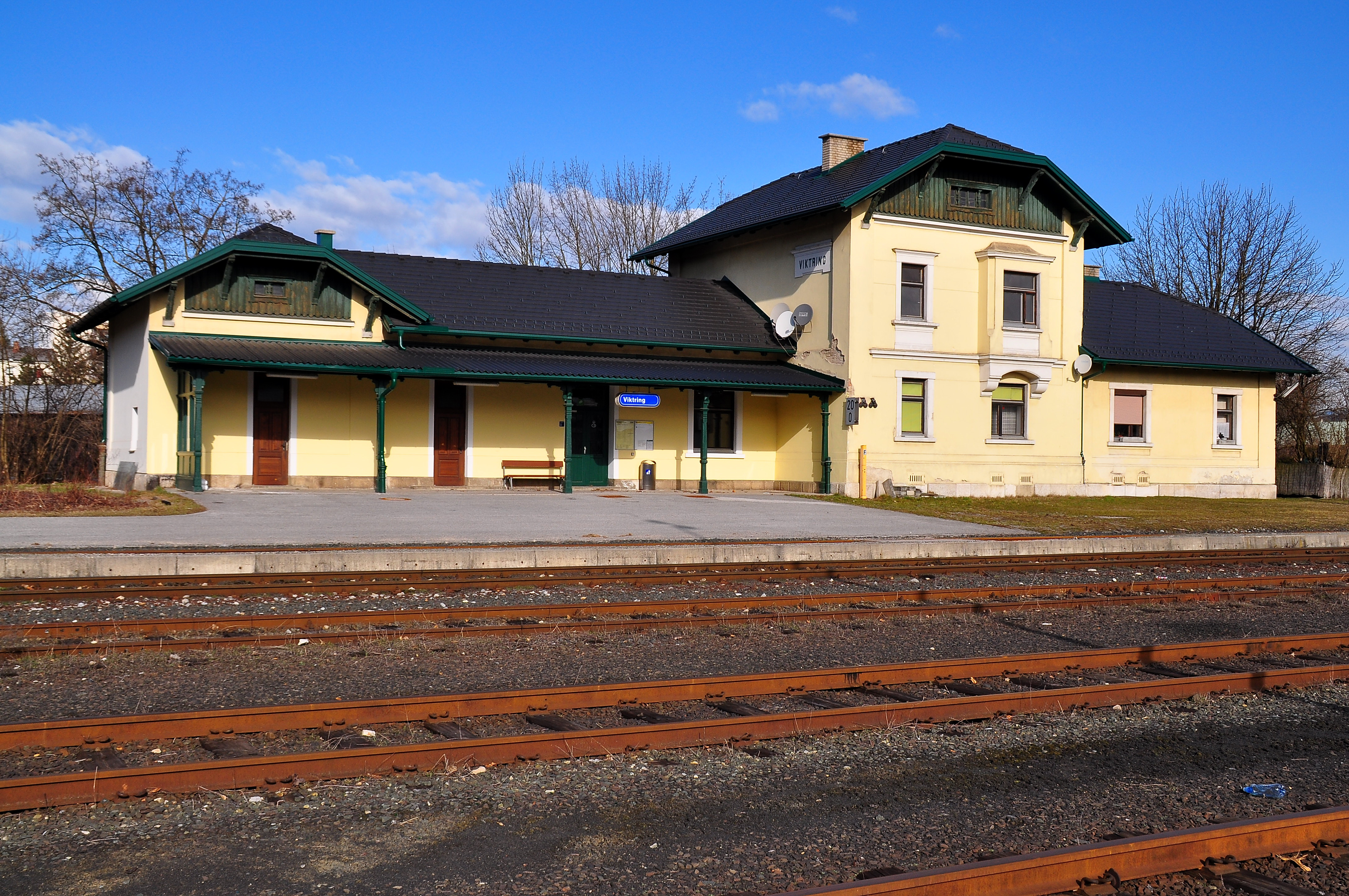
Viktring train station

Viktring (Slovene: Vetrinj) is the 13th district of Klagenfurt, Carinthia, Austria.

== History ==
The area was heavily affected by flooding in August 2023.

== Building ==
- Viktring Abbey
