= Emma Lundberg (scientist) =

Swedish cell biologist

- Education: KTH Royal Institute of Technology
- Scientific career
- Workplaces: Science for Life Laboratory; KTH Royal Institute of Technology
- Thesis: Bioimaging for analysis of protein expression in cells and tissues using affinity reagents (2008)

Emma Lundberg is a Swedish cell biologist who is a professor at the KTH Royal Institute of Technology and Director of Cell Profiling at the Science for Life Laboratory. Her research focuses on spatial proteomics and cell biology, using antibody-based approaches to study fundamental aspects of human biology and the impact of protein variation on disease.

She is currently an Associate Professor of Bioengineering and Pathology at Stanford University, and serves as Co-Founder and Chief Scientific Advisor at GenBio AI, an AI company developing multiscale AI foundation models for biology.

== Early life and education ==
Lundberg was an undergraduate and postgraduate student at the KTH Royal Institute of Technology. Her doctoral research introduced bio imaging as a means to understand expression in cells.

== Research and career ==
Lundberg combines computational investigations with experimental analysis to identify the spatiotemporal expression of proteins at the level of single cells. Eukaryotic cells can support multiple processes in parallel due to the compartmentalisation of biological processes. Each specific compartment describes a particular cellular function and the molecular controllers required to complete a specific function. When defects occur within the compartments, they can give rise to various forms of human disease.

Lundberg seeks to facilitate access to science and science communication. She created the human protein atlas the Cell Atlas, which looks to identify the sub-cellular localization of all human proteins. She was involved with the launch of “Project Discovery”, a citizen science project that uses members of the public to classify protein patterns. She integrated this project with Eve Online, a gaming platform.

Lundberg spent over two years at the Stanford School of Medicine. She has since made use of artificial intelligence to better understand microscopy images. The models created by Lundberg assist with image acquisition, processing and analysis. They can be used to segment data, enabling statistical analysis. Preliminary work indicated that human cells were considerably more complex than previously thought, including proteins that form into unfamiliar structures.

== Awards and honours ==
- 2016 Wallenberg Academy Fellow
- 2017 Swedish National Association of Chemical Engineers (Sveriges Kemiingenjörers Riksförening -SKR) annual prize
- 2018 Genetic Engineering & Biotechnology News Top 10 Under 40
- 2021 Royal Microscopical Society Scientific Achievement Award

== Selected publications ==
- Uhlen M; Oksvold P; Fagerberg L; et al. (December 2010). "Towards a knowledge-based Human Protein Atlas". Nature Biotechnology. 28 (12): 1248–50. doi:10.1038/nbt1210-1248. ISSN 1087-0156. PMID 21139605. Wikidata Q29617987.
- Emma Lundberg; Linn Fagerberg; Daniel Klevebring; et al. (1 December 2010). "Defining the transcriptome and proteome in three functionally different human cell lines". Molecular Systems Biology. 6: 450. doi:10.1038/msb.2010.106. ISSN 1744-4292. PMC 3018165. PMID 21179022. Wikidata Q34476804.
- Peter Thul; Lovisa Åkesson; Mikaela Wiking; et al. (11 May 2017). "A subcellular map of the human proteome". Science. 356 (6340). doi:10.1126/science.aal3321. ISSN 0036-8075. PMID 28495876. Wikidata Q48155823.
