= Ministry of Defence (Yugoslavia) =

Yugoslavian government ministry responsible for military and defense affairs

- Serbo-Croatian: Ministarstvo odbrane/Министарство одбране Slovene: Ministrstvo za obrambo Macedonian: Министерство за одбрана

Ministry overview
- Formed: 1 December 1918; 107 years ago
- Dissolved: 20 May 1992; 34 years ago
- Jurisdiction: Yugoslavia
- Headquarters: General Staff Building, Belgrade (1965–92); 44°48′20″N 20°27′40″E
- Ministers responsible: General Mihailo Rašić, first Minister of Defence; General of the Army Veljko Kadijević, last Minister of Defence
- Parent department: Federal Executive Council (1953–92)

Through the history of Yugoslavia, the defence ministry which was responsible for defence of the country was known under these names: the Ministry of the Army and Navy (Note: Serbo-Croatian: Ministarstvo vojske i mornarice / Министарство војске и морнарице) for the Kingdom of Yugoslavia from 1918 to 1941, and the Federal Secretariat of People's Defence (Note: Serbo-Croatian: Savezni sekretarijat za narodnu odbranu / Савезни секретаријат за народну одбрану, SSNO) for the Socialist Federal Republic of Yugoslavia from 1945 to 1992.

== List of ministers ==
† denotes people who died in office.

=== Kingdom of Yugoslavia (1918–1941) ===
Minister of the Army

No.	Portrait	Minister of the Army	Took office	Left office	Time in office	Party	Defence branch
1	Mihailo Rašić	General; Mihailo Rašić (1858–1932) (Note: Previously served as Minister of the Army of the Kingdom of Serbia.)	1 December 1918	20 December 1918	19 days	Independent	Royal Army

Minister of the Army and Navy

No.	Portrait	Minister of the Army and Navy	Took office	Left office	Time in office	Party	Defence branch
1	Mihailo Rašić	General; Mihailo Rašić (1858–1932)	20 December 1918	30 March 1919	100 days	Independent	Royal Army
2	Stevan Hadžić	General; Stevan Hadžić (1868–1931)	30 March 1919	19 February 1920	326 days	Independent	Royal Army
3	Branko Jovanović	General; Branko Jovanović (1868–1921)	19 February 1920	26 March 1921	1 year, 35 days	Independent	Royal Army
–	Milorad Drašković	Milorad Drašković (1873–1921); Acting; Minister of the Interior	27 March 1921	24 May 1921	58 days	DS	none
(2)	Stevan Hadžić	General; Stevan Hadžić (1868–1931)	24 May 1921	20 July 1921	57 days	Independent	Royal Army
4	Miloje Zečević	General; Miloje Zečević (1872–1946)	20 July 1921	3 January 1922	167 days	Independent	Royal Army
5	Miloš Vasić	General; Miloš Vasić (1859–1935)	5 January 1922	4 November 1922	303 days	Independent	Royal Army
6	Petar Pešić	Army general Petar Pešić (1871–1944) (Note: General when appointed. Army general since 1923.)	4 November 1922	27 July 1924	1 year, 266 days	Independent	Royal Army
(2)	Stevan Hadžić	Army general Stevan Hadžić (1868–1931)	27 July 1924	6 November 1924	102 days	Independent	Royal Army
7	Dušan Trifunović	Divisional general Dušan Trifunović (1880–1942)	6 November 1924	24 December 1926	2 years, 48 days	Independent	Royal Army
(2)	Stevan Hadžić	Army general Stevan Hadžić (1868–1931)	24 December 1926	23 April 1931 †	4 years, 120 days	Independent	Royal Army
8	Dragomir Stojanović	Army general Dragomir Stojanović (1878–1943)	24 April 1931	18 April 1934	2 years, 359 days	Independent	Royal Army
9	Milan Milovanović	Army general Milan Milovanović (1874–1942)	18 April 1934	22 October 1934	187 days	Independent	Royal Army
10	Petar Živković	Army general Petar Živković (1879–1947)	22 October 1934	7 March 1936	1 year, 137 days	Independent	Royal Army
11	Ljubomir Marić	Army general Ljubomir Marić (1878–1960)	8 March 1936	25 August 1938	2 years, 170 days	Independent	Royal Army
12	Milutin Nedić	Army general Milutin Nedić (1882–1945)	25 August 1938	26 August 1939	1 year, 1 day	Independent	Royal Army
13	Milan Nedić	Army general Milan Nedić (1877–1946) (Note: Brother of Milutin Nedić. Later served as the Prime Minister of the Government of National Salvation from 1941 to 1944.)	26 August 1939	6 November 1940	1 year, 72 days	Independent	Royal Army
(6)	Petar Pešić	Army general Petar Pešić (1871–1944) (Note: Removed from office in the Yugoslav coup d'état.)	6 November 1940	27 March 1941	141 days	Independent	Royal Army
14	Bogoljub Ilić	Army general Bogoljub Ilić (1881–1953)	27 March 1941	18 April 1941	22 days	Independent	Royal Army

=== Yugoslav government-in-exile (1941–1945) ===
Minister of the Army and Navy

No.	Portrait	Minister of the Army and Navy	Took office	Left office	Time in office	Party	Defence branch
1	Bogoljub Ilić	Army general Bogoljub Ilić (1881–1953) (Note: Ministry split into two, Ministry of the Army and Ministry of the Air Force and Navy.)	18 April 1941	21 August 1941	125 days	Independent	Royal Army

Minister of the Army

No.	Portrait	Minister of the Army	Took office	Left office	Time in office	Party	Defence branch
1	Bogoljub Ilić	Army general Bogoljub Ilić (1881–1953)	21 August 1941	11 January 1942	143 days	Independent	Royal Army
2	Dragoljub Mihailović	Brigadier general Dragoljub Mihailović (1893–1946) (Note: Ministry joined with Ministry of the Air Force and Navy.)	11 January 1942	14 January 1942	3 days	Independent	JVuO

Minister of the Air Force and Navy

No.	Portrait	Minister of the Air Force and Navy	Took office	Left office	Time in office	Party	Defence branch
1	Dušan Simović	Army general Dušan Simović (1882–1962)	21 August 1941	11 January 1942	153 days	Independent	Royal Air Force
2	Dragoljub Mihailović	Brigadier general Dragoljub Mihailović (1893–1946) (Note: Ministry joined with Ministry of the Army.)	11 January 1942	14 January 1942	3 days	Independent	JVuO

Minister of the Army, Navy and Air Force

No.	Portrait	Minister of the Army, Navy and Air Force	Took office	Left office	Time in office	Party	Defence branch
1	Dragoljub Mihailović	Army general Dragoljub Mihailović (1893–1946) (Note: Brigadier general when appointed. Divisional general since 19 January 1942 and Army general since 17 June 1942. Chief of Staff of the Supreme Command of the Yugoslav Army in the Homeland from 10 June 1942. Until 1 July 1944, on behalf of Mihailović and due to his absence, designated representatives (Slobodan Jovanović, Petar Živković and Božidar Purić) implemented decisions of the government.)	14 January 1942	1 July 1944	2 years, 169 days	Independent	JVuO
–	Ivan Šubašić	Ivan Šubašić (1892–1955); Acting	1 July 1944	11 September 1944	72 days	HSS	none
2	Borisav Ristić	Divisional general Borisav Ristić (1883–1967)	11 September 1944	26 January 1945	137 days	Independent	JVvO
–	Ivan Šubašić	Ivan Šubašić (1892–1955); Acting	26 January 1945	7 March 1945	40 days	HSS	none

=== National Committee for the Liberation of Yugoslavia (1943–1945) ===
No.	Portrait	Commissioner for Defence	Took office	Left office	Time in office	Party	Defence branch
1	Josip Broz Tito	Marshal of Yugoslavia; Josip Broz Tito (1892–1980)	29 November 1943	7 March 1945	1 year, 98 days	SKJ	NOV i POJ

=== SFR Yugoslavia (1945–1992) ===
The Federal Secretary of People's Defence of the Socialist Federal Republic of Yugoslavia (Serbo-Croatian, Croatian, Serbian, Macedonian: Savezni sekretar za narodnu odbranu SFRJ, Cyrillic: Савезни секретар за народну одбрану СФРЈ) was that country's defence minister during its existence from 1945 to 1992. He was the head of the Federal Secretariat of People's Defence (Savezni sekretarijat za narodnu odbranu - SSNO) and it was the most effective military person, while the Chief of the General Staff of the Yugoslav People's Army (which was the formational part of SSNO) was the most professional and staff body.

It was the part of the Federal Executive Council (Federal Government).

No.	Portrait	Federal Secretary of People's Defence	Took office	Left office	Time in office	Party	Defence branch
1	Josip Broz Tito	Marshal of Yugoslavia; Josip Broz Tito (1892–1980) (Note: Prime Minister of Yugoslavia from 1943 to 1963. President of Yugoslavia from 1953 to 1980.)	7 March 1945	14 January 1953	7 years, 313 days	SKJ	Armed Forces
2	Ivan Gošnjak	General of the Army; Ivan Gošnjak (1909–1980) (Note: Colonel general when appointed. General of the Army since 1955. Considered for promotion to rank General (YPA) in 1955.)	14 January 1953	18 May 1967	14 years, 124 days	SKJ	Ground Forces
3	Nikola Ljubičić	General of the Army; Nikola Ljubičić (1916–2005) (Note: Colonel general when appointed. General of the Army since 1970. Afterwards served as the President of the Presidency of SR Serbia from 1982 to 1984, and as a member of the Presidency of Yugoslavia for SR Serbia from 1984 to 1989.)	18 May 1967	5 May 1982	14 years, 352 days	SKJ	Ground Forces
4	Branko Mamula	Admiral of the Fleet; Branko Mamula (1921–2021) (Note: Admiral when appointed. Admiral of the Fleet since 1983. Previously served as the Chief of the General Staff from 1979 to 1982.)	5 May 1982	15 May 1988	6 years, 10 days	SKJ	Navy
5	Veljko Kadijević	General of the Army; Veljko Kadijević (1925–2014) (Note: Colonel general when appointed. General of the Army since 1989. Resigned from his position.)	15 May 1988	8 January 1992	3 years, 235 days	SKJ	Ground Forces
–	Blagoje Adžić	Colonel general Blagoje Adžić (1932–2012); Acting	8 January 1992	27 February 1992	50 days	Independent	Ground Forces
–	Života Panić	Colonel general Života Panić (1933–2003); Acting	27 February 1992	20 May 1992	83 days	Independent	Ground Forces

== Standards ==
Standard of the Minister of Defence of the Kingdom of Yugoslavia.

Standard of the Minister of the Army and Navy of the Kingdom of Yugoslavia 1937–1944.

Standard of the Minister of the Army and Navy of the Kingdom of Yugoslavia 1944–1945.

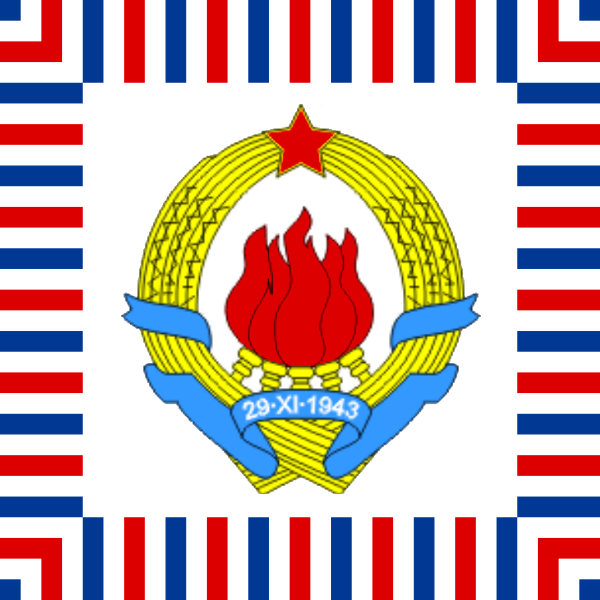
Standard of the Federal Secretary of People's Defence of the SFR Yugoslavia 1956–1963.

Standard of the Federal Secretary of People's Defence of the SFR Yugoslavia 1963–1993.

== See also ==
- Ministry of Defence (Serbia and Montenegro)
- Ministry of Defence (Bosnia and Herzegovina)
- Ministry of Defence (Croatia)
- Ministry of Defence (Kosovo)
- Ministry of Defence (Montenegro)
- Ministry of Defense of North Macedonia
- Ministry of Defence (Serbia)
- Ministry of Defence (Slovenia)
