= Stevan Hadžić =

- Стеван Хаџић
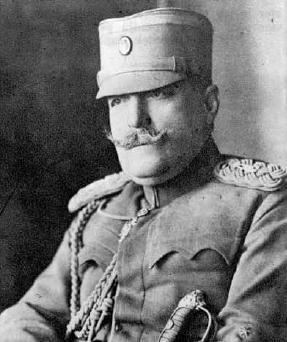

2nd, 5th, 9th and 11th Minister of Army and Navy of Kingdom of Serbs, Croats and Slovenes
- In office 30 March 1919 – 19 February 1920
- Monarch: Peter I
- Prime Minister: Stojan Protić; Ljubomir Davidović
- Preceded by: Mihailo Rašić
- Succeeded by: Branko Jovanović
- In office 24 May – 20 July 1921
- Monarch: Peter I
- Prime Minister: Nikola Pašić
- Preceded by: Milorad Drašković (acting)
- Succeeded by: Miloje Zečević
- In office 27 July – 6 November 1924
- Monarch: Alexander I
- Prime Minister: Ljubomir Davidović
- Preceded by: Petar Pešić
- Succeeded by: Dušan Trifunović
- In office 24 December 1926 – 6 January 1929
- Monarch: Alexander I
- Prime Minister: Nikola Pašić; Nikola Uzunović; Velimir Vukićević; Anton Korošec
- Preceded by: Dušan Trifunović
- Succeeded by: Himself (as Minister of Army and Nay of Kingdom of Yugoslavia)

1st Minister of Army and Navy of Kingdom of Yugoslavia
- In office 6 January 1929 – 23 April 1931
- Monarch: Alexander I
- Prime Minister: Petar Živković
- Preceded by: Himself (as Minister of Army and Navy of Kingdom of Serbs, Croats and Slovenes)
- Succeeded by: Dragomir Stojanović

Personal details
- Born: 19 February 1868 Belgrade, Principality of Serbia
- Died: 23 April 1931 (aged 63)
- Resting place: Novo groblje
- Spouse: Yelisavet-Eola
- Children: Vojislav Hadžić (son); Olga Hadžić (daughter)

Military service
- Allegiance: Serbia; Yugoslavia
- Branch/service: Royal Serbian Army; Royal Yugoslav Army
- Rank: General; Army general

Stevan Hadžić (19 February 1868 – 23 April 1931) was a general of the Royal Serbian Army and an army general of the Royal Yugoslav Army. In the Kingdom of Yugoslavia, he served four times as Minister of the Army and Navy and remained there until his death.

== Early life ==
Hadžić was born on 19 February 1868 in Belgrade, to father Svetozar, a Serbian Army infantry colonel (in the Serbian-Turkish Wars he was the commander of the Čačak and parish brigade), and mother Mileva née Gherman. He joined the army in 1885 as a volunteer student of the 14th Infantry Regiment in the Serbo-Bulgarian War and returned to full-time education after the war. After graduating from high school in Niš, he enrolled in the 19th class of the Military Academy in 1886 and graduated four years later (1889).

After acquiring the rank of artillery lieutenant, he was sent to Imperial Russia for training. The Russian Ministry first deployed him to an internship at the 35th Russian Artillery Brigade in Kostroma, after which he was admitted to the Nikolaev General Staff Academy in St. Petersburg (1891–1895).

He was married in 1901 to Yelisavet-Eola (1879–1966), daughter of Colonel Alexander Simonović and Milica born Spasić, a later court lady of Queen Mary. They had a son Vojislav and a daughter Olga (1905–1965) who, in 1927, married Colonel Nikola Canić (1897–1986). Their daughter is Mirjana Canić-Radojlović (1932).

== A whirlwind career ==
Upon his return to Serbia, his whirlwind military career began: from a sergeant in an artillery regiment, he was promoted to head of the General Staff Section and Chief of the Ministry of the Military by 1910. In the same year, he was appointed a military envoy to St. Petersburg, where he remained until the beginning of the Second Balkan War. After returning to Serbia, he took command of the Drina Division, which distinguished itself in the Battle of Bregalnica. In the Great War, he first led the Šumadia Division in combat in Mačva, and in August 1914 he was appointed Chief of Staff of the First Army. After retreating to Corfu, Hadžić was given a duty that would mark his further life. Pursuant to the decree of the Minister of the Military of 24 February 1916, namely, the formation of the 1st Regiment of the Serb volunteer detachment. Composed of Serbian POWs, formerly in the ranks of the Austrian Army and originally from Serbian lands of the Habsburg Empire, volunteered en masse and in February the First Serbian Volunteer Division numbered almost 10,000 men in Russia, with Colonel Hadžić appointed as its commander. Hadžić arrived in Corfu, accompanied by 21 officers and just as many lower ranks, on a new duty in Odessa on 23 April 1916. Volunteers still continued to come and by mid-August (1916), the division had nearly 18,000 men.

On 27 August 1916, Romania entered the war on the side of the Entente. In order to prevent the penetration of Bulgarian-German Turkish forces in Dobruja, the Russian supreme command decided to deploy troops to that part of the front as reinforcement. The Serbian Volunteer Division was part of the newly formed Russian-Serbian 47th Corps of General Andrei Zayonchkovsky. The unit arrived from Odessa to the villages of Koru Nasradina and Kara Sinan on 5 September and entered the battle of Dobrich two days later. The fighting in Dobruja lasted until the end of October; due to Romania's weak holding, the enemy made great progress on this part of the front, so the Serbian Division was withdrawn on 26 October 1916 in the Izmail region. During these fighting, 8,000 men were lost in battle. In early 1917, Hadžić as commander was able to stem the tide and lead his division from victory to victory. In March 1917, after completing operations in Dobruja, he was appointed a military envoy to Romania, where he remained until 1919.

== Four times Minister of War ==
On February 17, 1920, Hadžić was appointed the commander of the Second Army and remained in that position until 29 March 1921. Between March 1921 and December 1926 (with interruptions from 24 May to 20 July 1921, and from 27 July to 6 November 1924, when he was Minister of the Army and Navy for the second and third time, he served as King Alexander's first adjutant. He was elected Minister of the Army and Navy for the fourth time in 1926 and held that position until his death, April 23, 1931.

== Helping refugees from the October Revolution ==
Hadžić never forgot the days spent studying, serving and fighting in Imperial Russia. His appreciation and love for Russia became pronounced after the outbreak of the October Revolution and the Civil War, which led to a large influx of Russian emigrées into Serbia. To the best of his ability, he endeavored to assist them, and in gratitude was elected an honorary member of the Society of Russian General Staff Officers, the Society of Cavaliers of the Order of Saint George and the Georgian Arms and the Sarajevo Colony.

He died at his family home on 23 April 1931. He is buried in the Belgrade New Cemetery.

== Sources ==
- Bjelajac, Mile (2004). Генерали и адмирали Краљевине Југославије 1918—1941 [Generals and admirals of the Kingdom of Yugoslavia 1918—1941] (in Serbian). Belgrade: Institute for New Serbian History. ISBN 978-86-7005-039-6.
- Stanić, Đorđe (2003). Верници српства и отаџбине [Believers of Serbia and the homeland] (in Serbian). Belgrade: Military Publishing House. ISBN 978-86-335-0134-7.
