= 42nd Infantry Division Murska =

Royal Yugoslav Army formation

- Active: 1935 – 11 April 1941
- Country: Yugoslavia
- Branch: Royal Yugoslav Army
- Type: Infantry
- Size: Division
- Part of: 4th Army
- Patron: Mur river
- Engagements: World War II: Invasion of Yugoslavia

Commanders
- Notable commanders: Borisav Ristić

The 42nd Infantry Division Murska was an infantry formation of the Royal Yugoslav Army that formed part of the 4th Army during the German-led Axis invasion of the Kingdom of Yugoslavia in April 1941. It did not have a corresponding divisional district in peacetime, and was raised at the time of mobilisation. Like all Yugoslav infantry divisions of the time, it was a very large and unwieldy formation which was almost entirely reliant on animal transport for mobility, and also lacked modern arms and sufficient ammunition. Commanded by Divizijski đeneral Borisav Ristić, it was largely manned by Croat troops, many of whom saw the Germans as potential liberators from Serbian oppression.

Along with the rest of the Yugoslav Army, the 42nd Infantry Division Murska began mobilising on 3 April 1941, and was still engaged in that process three days later when the Germans began an air campaign and a series of preliminary operations against the Yugoslav frontiers. These attacks prompted desertions from the division which increased over the following days. The division briefly established a defensive line behind the Drava river, then fell back towards the Bednja river to conform with the withdrawals of flanking formations. On 10 April, the 14th Panzer Division broke out of a bridgehead on the right flank of the division and by early evening it had reached Zagreb. The following day, German formations attacking from the north had outflanked the division on its left. Encircled, it promptly surrendered. Almost all of the Croat members of the 4th Army taken as prisoners of war were soon released by the Axis powers.

== Background ==
A map showing the location of Yugoslavia in Europe

The Kingdom of Serbs, Croats and Slovenes was created with the merger of kingdoms of Serbia and Montenegro with the State of Slovenes, Croats and Serbs, the predominantly South Slav-inhabited area of dissolving Austria-Hungary, on 1 December 1918 in the immediate aftermath of World War I. The Army of the Kingdom of Serbs, Croats and Slovenes was established to defend the new state. It was formed around the nucleus of the victorious Royal Serbian Army, as well as armed formations raised in regions formerly controlled by Austria-Hungary. Many former Austro-Hungarian officers and soldiers became members of the new army. From the beginning, much like other aspects of public life in the new kingdom, the army was dominated by ethnic Serbs, who saw it as a means by which to secure Serb political hegemony.

The army's development was hampered by the kingdom's poor economy, and this continued during the 1920s. In 1929, King Alexander changed the name of the country to the Kingdom of Yugoslavia, at which time the army was renamed the Royal Yugoslav Army (Serbo-Croatian Latin: Vojska Kraljevine Jugoslavije, VKJ). The army budget remained tight, and as tensions rose across Europe during the 1930s, it became difficult to secure weapons and munitions from other countries. Consequently, at the time World War II broke out in September 1939, the VKJ had several serious weaknesses, which included reliance on draught animals for transport, and the large size of its formations. Infantry divisions had a wartime strength of 26,000–27,000 men, as compared to contemporary British infantry divisions of half that strength. These characteristics resulted in slow, unwieldy formations, and the inadequate supply of arms and munitions meant that even the very large Yugoslav formations had low firepower. Generals better suited to the trench warfare of World War I were combined with an army that was neither equipped nor trained to resist the fast-moving combined arms approach used by the Germans in their invasions of Poland and France.

The weaknesses of the VKJ in strategy, structure, equipment, mobility and supply were exacerbated by serious ethnic disunity within Yugoslavia, resulting from two decades of Serb hegemony and the attendant lack of political legitimacy achieved by the central government. Attempts to address the disunity came too late to ensure that the VKJ was a cohesive force. Fifth column activity was also a serious concern, not only from the Croatian nationalist Ustaše but also from the country's Slovene and ethnic German minorities.

== Structure ==
=== Peacetime organisation ===
According to regulations issued by the VKJ in 1935, the headquarters of the 42nd Infantry Division Murska (42nd ID) would be created at the time of mobilisation. Unlike most other Yugoslav divisions, the 42nd ID did not have a corresponding divisional district in peacetime, and would be allocated units from other divisional districts and the VKJ reserve when it was formed. The division was named for the Mura river, a tributary of the Drava.

=== Wartime organisation ===
The wartime organisation of the VKJ was laid down by regulations issued in 1936–37, which set the strength of an infantry division at 26,000–27,000 men. A total of 11,200 horses and other pack and draught animals were required to provide mobility for each infantry division. The theoretical wartime organisation of a fully mobilised Yugoslav infantry division was:

- headquarters
- divisional infantry headquarters, with three or four infantry regiments
- divisional artillery headquarters, with one or two artillery regiments
- a cavalry battalion with two squadrons, a bicycle squadron and a machine gun platoon
- a pioneer battalion of three companies
- an anti-tank company, equipped with twelve 37 mm (1.5 in) or 47 mm (1.9 in) anti-tank guns
- a machine gun company
- an anti-aircraft machine gun company
- a signals company
- logistics units

Each infantry regiment was to consist of three or four infantry battalions and a machine gun company, and the divisional artillery regiments were animal-drawn and largely equipped with World War I-vintage pieces. An artillery regiment consisted of four battalions, one of 100 mm (3.9 in) light howitzers, one of 65 mm (2.6 in) or 75 mm (3.0 in) mountain guns, and two of 75 mm (3.0 in) or 80 mm (3.1 in) field guns. The 42nd ID was included on the wartime order of battle in "Defence Plan S", which was developed by the Yugoslav General Staff in 1938–1939. It was to be formed using the 36th Infantry Regiment administered by the Savska divisional district, with the addition of the 105th and 126th Infantry Regiments and 42nd Artillery Regiment attached from the VJK reserve.

== Planned deployment ==
Planned deployment locations for 42nd ID and flanking formations

The 42nd ID was a component of the 4th Army as part of the 1st Army Group, which was responsible for the defence of north and northwestern Yugoslavia. In the event of mobilisation, the 4th Army was to deploy in a cordon along the western sector of the Hungarian border, with the 42nd ID opposite the Hungarian city of Nagykanizsa. The 42nd ID was to establish positions between the triple border with Germany and Hungary and the confluence of the Mura and Drava at Legrad, with divisional headquarters at Seketin, just south of Varaždin. On the left flank of the division it was planned that the Detachment Ormozski would be positioned west of Varaždin and centred around Ivanec, and on the right flank would be the 27th Infantry Division Savska (27th ID) positioned opposite the Hungarian village of Gyékényes. The only border guard unit in the division's area of responsibility was the 341st Reserve Regiment.

== Operations ==
=== Mobilisation ===
After unrelenting pressure from Adolf Hitler, Yugoslavia signed the Tripartite Pact on 25 March 1941. On 27 March, a military coup d'état overthrew the government that had signed the pact, and a new government was formed under the Royal Yugoslav Army Air Force commander, Armijski đeneral (Note: Equivalent to a U.S. Army lieutenant general.) Dušan Simović. A general mobilisation was not called by the new government until 3 April 1941, out of fear of offending Hitler and thus precipitating war. However, on the same day as the coup Hitler issued Führer Directive 25 which called for Yugoslavia to be treated as a hostile state, and on 3 April, Führer Directive 26 was issued, detailing the plan of attack and command structure for the invasion, which was to commence on 6 April.

The 42nd ID had only commenced mobilisation, and was largely in its mobilisation centres or moving to concentration areas. On the night of 5/6 April, the elements of the division were located as follows:

- the divisional commander Divizijski đeneral (Note: Equivalent to a U.S. Army major general.) Borisav Ristić and his headquarters staff were mobilising in the Zagreb area
- the 36th Infantry Regiment was concentrating in the Ludbreg district
- the 105th Infantry Regiment, with about 55 percent of its troops, was concentrating in the Varaždin area
- the 126th Infantry Regiment was mobilising in Zagreb
- the 42nd Artillery Regiment headquarters and two batteries were mobilising in Zagreb, with the remaining two batteries mobilising in Varaždin
- the divisional cavalry squadron was located in Čakovec
- the remainder of the divisional units were mobilising in Zagreb

Orders were subsequently issued for the 36th Infantry Regiment to join the 27th ID, replaced by the 39th Infantry Regiment from Detachment Ormozki. Two artillery batteries from the 40th Artillery Regiment of the 40th ID that were mobilising in Varaždin were ordered to join the 42nd ID.

=== 6 April ===
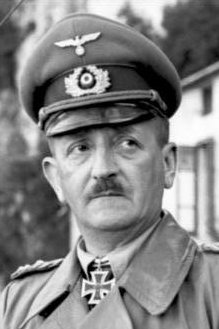
General der Panzertruppe Heinrich von Vietinghoff commanded the XXXXVI Motorised Corps

German Army headquarters wanted to capture the bridges over the Drava intact, and from 1 April had issued orders to the 2nd Army to conduct preliminary operations aimed at seizing bridges by coups de main. As a result, limited objective attacks were launched along the line of the Drava by the XXXXVI Motorised Corps of General der Panzertruppe (Note: Equivalent to a U.S. Army lieutenant general.) Heinrich von Vietinghoff, despite the fact that they were not expected to launch offensive operations until 10 April. Similar operations occurred on the extreme left flank of the 4th Army, where raiding parties and patrols from LI Infantry Corps, commanded by General der Infanterie (Note: Equivalent to a U.S. Army lieutenant general.) Hans-Wolfgang Reinhard, seized high ground on the south side of the Drava.

In the early hours of 6 April 1941, the 42nd ID had been tasked to deploy along the southern bank of the Drava between Varaždin and Sveti Đurđ. The 105th Infantry Regiment was to be the left forward regiment of the division around Varaždin, the 36th Infantry Regiment was to be the right forward regiment in the vicinity of Sveti Đurđ, and the 126th Infantry Regiment was marching from Zagreb towards Jankovac, west of Koprivnica, to create depth behind the 36th Infantry Regiment. Only the 36th Infantry Regiment was in position. The 42nd Artillery Regiment was to be split: the regimental headquarters and two batteries were to take up positions near Turčin just south of Varaždin supporting the 105th Infantry Regiment; one battery was to deploy to Selnik; and the other battery was to be located near Poljanec; both supporting the 36th Infantry Regiment. The divisional cavalry squadron was to deploy near Vrbanovec between the two forward infantry regiments, and the divisional headquarters was to be located at Seketin as planned. Two batteries of the 40th Artillery Regiment, which belonged to the 40th Infantry Division Slavonska, were mobilising within the 42nd ID area at Varaždin and had been tasked to support the right flank of the division. Detachment Ormozki on the left flank of the division was deployed around Vinica, south of Ormož, and was placed under Ristić's command.

LI Infantry Corps seized the intact bridge over the Mura at Gornja Radgona on the German border. About 05:20, the border troops in the Prekmurje region north of the Mura, forward of Detachment Ormozki, were attacked by German troops advancing across the border, and began withdrawing south across the Mura into the Međimurje region. An hour later, German units also crossed the Hungarian border and attacked border troops at Dolnja Lendava north of the Mura.

A bicycle-mounted detachment of Generalmajor (Note: Equivalent to a U.S. Army brigadier general.) Benignus Dippold's 183rd Infantry Division captured Murska Sobota in the Prekmurje region without encountering resistance. The Germans also cleared most of the rest of the Prekmurje region during the day. The German Luftwaffe bombed and strafed Yugoslav positions and troops on the march. By the afternoon, German troops had captured Dolnja Lendava, and by the evening it had become clear to the Germans that the Yugoslavs would not be resisting stubbornly at the border. XXXXVI Motorised Corps was then ordered to begin seizing bridges over the Mura. In the sector of the 42nd ID, these bridges were at Mursko Središće, which is south of Murska Sobota, and at Letenye further west. On the 42nd ID's right flank, German troops were also tasked to capture a bridge over the Drava at Zákány in the 27th ID sector. These local attacks were sufficient to inflame dissent within the largely Croat 4th Army, many of whom refused to resist Germans they considered their liberators from Serbian oppression during the interwar period. In the afternoon, German Junkers Ju 87 Stuka dive bombers of Sturzkampfgeschwader 77 escorted by Messerschmitt Bf 109E fighters caught the air reconnaissance assets of the 4th Army on the ground at Velika Gorica, destroying most of them.

The continuing mobilisation and concentration of the 4th Army was hampered by escalating fifth column activities and propaganda fomented by the Ustaše. Some units stopped mobilising, or began returning to their mobilisation centres from their concentration areas. During the day, Yugoslav sabotage units attempted to destroy bridges over the Mura at Mursko Središće, Letenye and Kotoriba. These attempts were only partially successful, due to the influence of Ustaše propaganda. The Yugoslav radio network in the 4th Army area was sabotaged by the Ustaše on 6 April, and radio communications within the 4th Army remained poor throughout the fighting.

=== 7 April ===
Reconnaissance units of the XXXXVI Motorised Corps crossed the Mura at Letenye and Mursko Središće early on 7 April, and captured Čakovec. The 42nd ID was ordered to urgently dispatch the 2nd Battalion of the 36th Infantry Regiment from Ludbreg towards Koprivnica to assist the 27th ID in repelling the expected German attempt to cross the Drava at Zákány, but this order was soon modified to require the detachment of the whole 36th Infantry Regiment. Ustaše propaganda led the bulk of two regiments from the 42nd ID to revolt; only two battalions from the units deployed to their allocated positions. In the face of the German advance, the border troops of the 341st Reserve Regiment withdrew towards the Drava. On the right flank of the 42nd ID, the Germans crossed the Drava at Zákány and attacked units of the 27th ID. The 2nd Battalion of the 36th Infantry Regiment was unable to reach its starting position for the counterattack on the Zákány bridgehead, and during the night of 7/8 April, it began to disintegrate. The 36th Infantry Regiment was formally transferred to the 27th ID on 7 April, and the 42nd ID received the 39th Infantry Regiment from Detachment Ormozski. By the end of 7 April, the 42nd ID and Detachment Ormozski were deployed along the southern bank of the Drava, while the border guard units were withdrawing towards the Drava, leaving Prekmurje to the Germans.

=== 8–9 April ===
On 8 April, the Germans cleared the area north of the Drava in the sector of the 42nd ID and Detachment Ormozski. The border guard units withdrew behind the Drava and were used to constitute the divisional reserve. Due to desertions from the 42nd Machine Gun Battalion, it was reconstituted in Varaždin using border guard personnel. On the following day, there was no fighting in the divisional sector, or in that of Detachment Ormozski. Desertions continued to mount, particularly in the 105th Infantry Regiment and 341st Reserve Regiment. Due to German successes along the rest of the 4th Army front, the commander of the 4th Army, Armijski đeneral Petar Nedeljković, ordered the main body of the 4th Army to withdraw. In the sector of the 42nd ID and Detachment Ormozski, this meant withdrawal from the Drava to behind the Bednja river, to conform to the line being held by the 27th ID on its immediate right flank. The leader of the Croatian Peasant Party, Vladko Maček issued a proclamation to calm the revolt by Croatian troops of the 4th Army, but to no avail.

=== 10 April ===
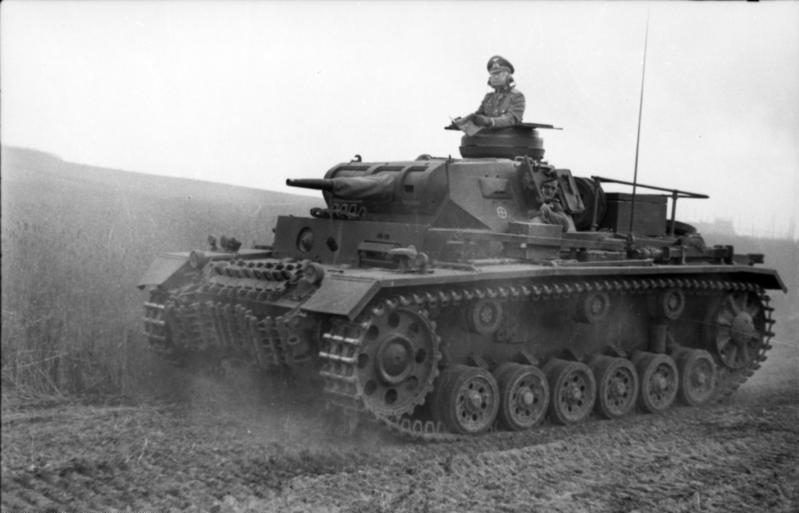
German tanks drove towards Zagreb on 10 April.

Early on 10 April, the 14th Panzer Division of Generalmajor Friedrich Kühn broke out of the Zákány bridgehead and drove towards Zagreb. This drive, made over snow-covered roads in extremely cold conditions, was closely supported by dive bombers. It struck the remnants of the 27th ID, numbering around 2,000 effectives, which were quickly encircled and surrendered. The 14th Panzer Division continued on, and by 19:30 lead elements had reached the outskirts of Zagreb, having covered nearly 160 kilometres (99 miles) in a single day. This thrust exposed the right flank of the 42nd ID, and threatened the lines of communication and rear areas of the 42nd ID and Detachment Ormozki.

About 09:45, the LI Infantry Corps also began crossing the Drava, but construction of a bridge near Maribor was suspended because the river was in flood. Despite this, the 183rd Infantry Division managed to secure an alternative crossing point, and established a bridgehead. This crossing point was a partially destroyed bridge, guarded by a single platoon of the 1st Bicycle Battalion of Detachment Ormozki. This crossing, combined with the withdrawal of the 7th Army's 38th Infantry Division Dravska from the line Slovenska Bistrica–Ptuj, exposed the left flank of Detachment Ormozki. The Detachment attempted to withdraw south, but began to disintegrate during the night 10/11 April, and the 1st Bicycle Battalion left to return to Ljubljana, although it soon disintegrated as well. There were no German attacks on the front of the 42nd ID, but in the afternoon, the remaining elements of the 42nd ID also began to withdraw though Varaždinske Toplice to Novi Marof on the Bednja, leaving the Ustaše to take control of Varaždin.

=== 11 April ===
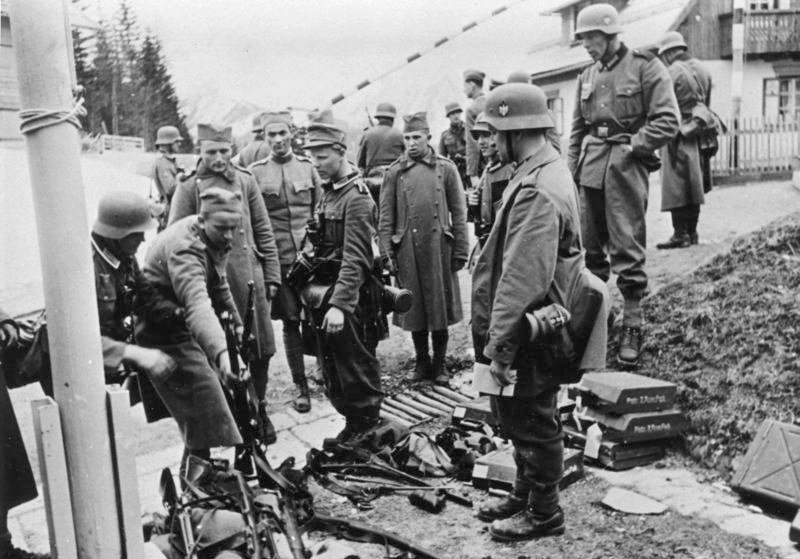
Surrendered Yugoslav troops handing in their weapons

Held up by freezing weather and snow storms, on 11 April LI Corps was approaching Zagreb from the north, and broke through a hastily established defensive line between Pregrada and Krapina, outflanking the 42nd ID and the remnants of Detachment Ormozki on the left. Bicycle-mounted troops of the 183rd Infantry Division turned east to secure Ustaše-controlled Varaždin. The 42nd ID and Detachment Ormozki were cut off north of Zagreb, and those elements that did not disperse to their homes withdrew into the Ivanšćica and Kalnik mountains. Ustaše propaganda continued to affect Croat military personnel and accelerated the disintegration of Yugoslav forces. In the evening, LI Infantry Corps entered Zagreb, the 42nd ID and Detachment Ormozki were completely encircled, and soon surrendered. On 15 April, a ceasefire was agreed. After a delay in locating appropriate signatories for the surrender document, the Yugoslav Supreme Command unconditionally surrendered in Belgrade effective at 12:00 on 18 April. Yugoslavia was then occupied and dismembered by the Axis powers, with Germany, Italy, Hungary, Bulgaria and Albania all annexing parts of its territory. Almost all of the Croat members of the 4th Army taken as prisoners of war were soon released by the Axis powers, as 90 per cent of those held for the duration of the war were Serbs.
