= Dragomir Stojanović =

Serbian military officer

General Dragomir Stojanović
- Serbian Cyrillic: Драгомир Стојановић
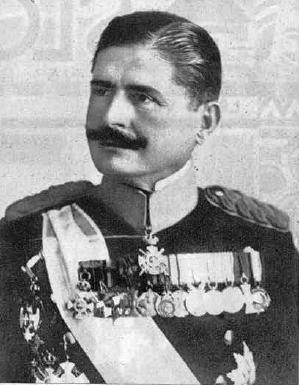
- Born: August 17, 1878; Knjaževac, Principality of Serbia
- Died: June 20, 1943 (aged 64); Belgrade, Nazi-occupied Serbia
- Military career
- Allegiance: Kingdom of Serbia; Kingdom of Yugoslavia
- Branch: Royal Serbian Army; Royal Yugoslav Army
- Rank: Army general
- Commands: Minister of the Army and Navy
- Conflicts: Balkan Wars; World War I Invasion of Yugoslavia
- Awards: Order of Karađorđe's Star

Dragomir Stojanović (Serbian Cyrillic: Драгомир Стојановић; 17 August 1878 – 20 June 1943) was a Serbian military officer and a Yugoslav army general, who served as the Minister of the Army and Navy of the Kingdom of Yugoslavia from 24 April 1931 to 18 April 1934.

Government offices
Preceded by Stevan Hadžić	Minister of the Army and Navy of the Kingdom of Yugoslavia; 24 April 1931 – 18 April 1934	Succeeded by Milan Milovanović
