= Mihailo Rašić =

Serbian minister of defence

- Михаило Рашић
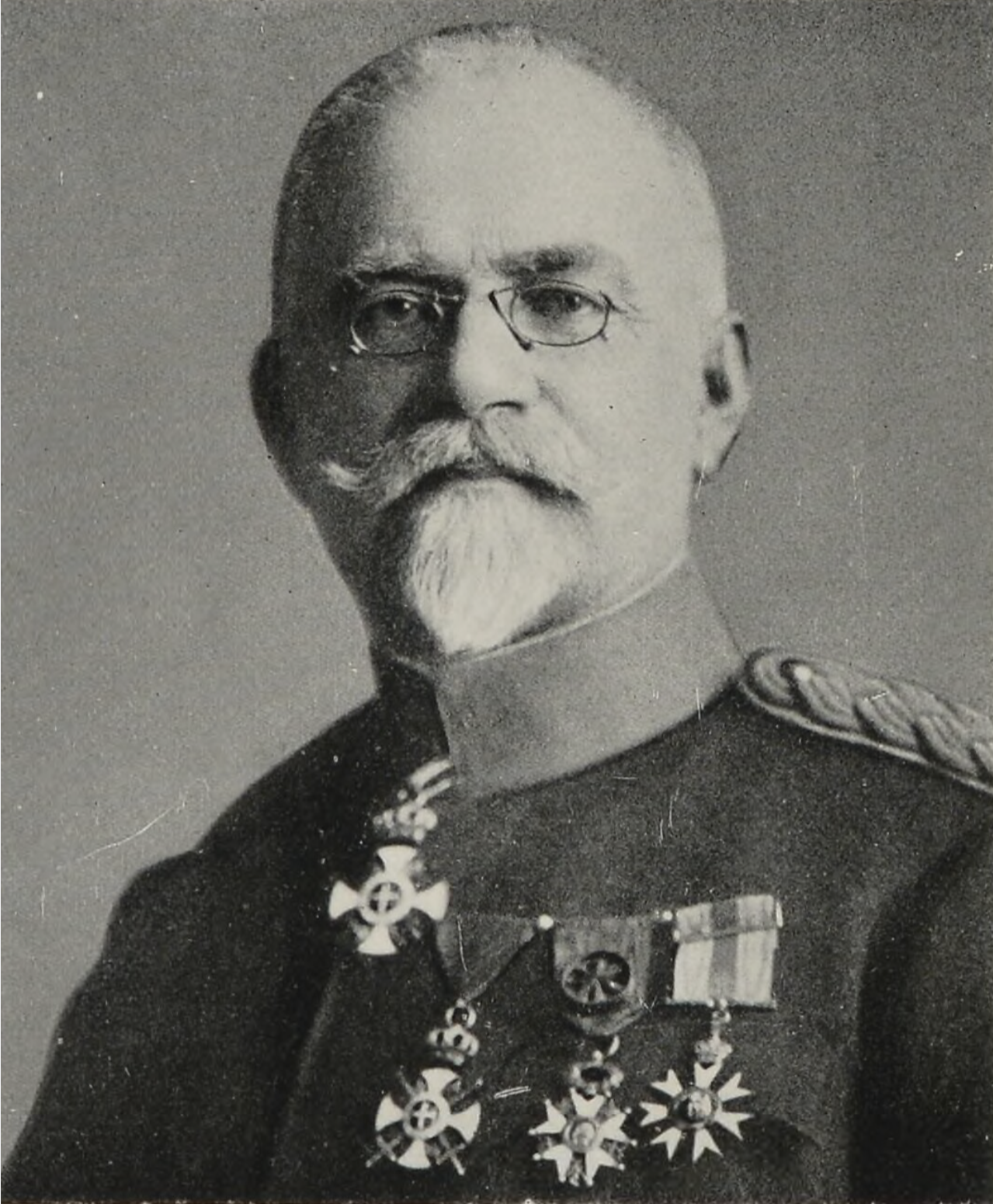
- Mihailo Rašić (c. 1918)

48th Minister of Army of Kingdom of Serbia
- In office 24 June 1918 – 1 December 1918
- Monarch: Peter I
- Prime Minister: Nikola Pašić
- Preceded by: Stojan Protić (acting)
- Succeeded by: Himself (as Minister of Army of Kingdom of Serbs, Croats and Slovens)

Minister of Army of Kingdom of Serbs, Croats and Slovenes
- In office 1 December 1918 – 20 December 1918
- Monarch: Peter I
- Prime Minister: Nikola Pašić
- Preceded by: Himself (as Minister of Army of Kingdom of Serbia)
- Succeeded by: Himself (as Minister of Army and Navy of Kingdom of Serbs, Croats and Slovens)

1st Minister of Army and Navy of Kingdom of Serbs, Croats and Slovenes
- In office 20 December 1918 – 30 March 1919
- Monarch: Peter I
- Prime Minister: Stojan Protić
- Preceded by: Himself (as Minister of Army of Kingdom of Serbs, Croats and Slovens)
- Succeeded by: Stevan Hadžić

25th Chief of Military Academy
- In office 1912–1914
- Preceded by: Mihailo Živković
- Succeeded by: Dissolved until 1919 (Živko Pavlović)

Personal details
- Born: 13 June 1858 Aleksinac, Principality of Serbia
- Died: 17 February 1932 (aged 73) Belgrade, Kingdom of Yugoslavia
- Resting place: Novo groblje
- Spouse: Leposava
- Children: Svetozar, Branivoje, and Dragoljub (sons) Katarina, Ružica, and Jelen (daughters)

Military service
- Allegiance: Serbia
- Branch/service: Royal Serbian Army
- Rank: General

Mihailo Rašić (first in uniform, from the left, listed as Michalia Nenadcitch) and others from the Royal Serbian Mission to the USA at City Hall, New York

Mihailo Rašić (Aleksinac, Principality of Serbia, 13 June 1858 - Belgrade, Kingdom of Serbia, 17 February 1932) was a Serbian military leader. He served as Royal Yugoslav Army general and Minister of War of the Kingdom of Serbia in World War I. After the war, in the Kingdom of Yugoslavia, he continued his service as Minister of the Army and Navy in the Ministry of Defence. He served as the 16th dean of the Academic Board of the Military Academy in Belgrade (1912–1914).

== Early life ==
Rašić was born on June 13, 1858, in Aleksinac to father Petar, a court clerk, and mother Katarina. In the third grade, he moved to Belgrade and lived with his aunt Stana until he graduated from high school. He enrolled in the Artillery School of the Military Academy as a cadet on 20 September 1874. He became a corporal on 6 September 1875, Sub-Sergeant on 4 May 1876, and sergeant on 1 June 1876. He graduated from the academy in September 1880, eighth in his class, ahead of Stepa Stepanović and Živojin Mišić.

== Military career ==
At the beginning of the First Serbian-Turkish War, Rašić and his fellow cadets in the Artillery School were mobilized. During this conflict he was promoted to the rank of infantry Sublieutenant on 10 December 1876. He became a lieutenant on 20 August 1883. Rašić was promoted to captain, 2nd class on 22 February 1887, full-fledged captain on 1 January 1891, major on 22 February 1893, lieutenant colonel on 22 February 1897, colonel on 6 April 1901, general on 20 October 1912, and Divisional General on 21 October 1923.

=== Active service ===
After the outbreak of the war, he was assigned as a cadet to the ordnance of the Headquarters of the Šumadija Artillery Brigade. He served with that unit from 10 December 1876, when he was promoted to the rank of artillery lieutenant. He was appointed platoon officer of the Field artillery in the same brigade. During the Second Serbian-Turkish War (1877), from 28 December he served as adjutant in the 1st Šumadija Artillery Regiment. He remained in that position until 12 April 1878 when he acted as an officer in the headquarters of the same brigade, assigned to the duties of the newly liberated Vranje district. From May 1 to 20 August 1878 he was sent to the Headquarters of the 1st Division of the Šumadija Corps. After that he returned as a commanding officer to the Sumadija Artillery Brigade. He remained in that position until 1 December 1878, when he resumed his schooling in Belgrade until he was interrupted by the 1876 war.

After graduating on 1 September 1880 he attended a German Military Academy. In 1883, he graduated and returned to Serbia, where he served in the ordnance department of the Lafetnice (military carriages section) of the Military Technical Institute. From April 1884, he was an adjutant of the Management of the Military Institute. In March 1885 he was appointed a water officer of the Timok Artillery Regiment. In the 1885 war conflict with Bulgaria, he was reassigned first to Nišava Army Headquarters, and then to the Operational Department of Supreme Command Headquarters. From 1 March 1886 to April 1887, he was at the head of the Telegraph Detachment.

On 16 April 1887, he became King Milan Obrenović's ordinance officer. Rašić performed this duty until February 21, 1889, when he was promoted to Prince Alexander Obrenović's Adjutant and King Milan Obrenović's Acting Adjutant. In addition to these duties, from October 1890 to September 1892, he served as commander of the 1st battery of the Danube Artillery Regiment. From September–November 1892 he served as acting commander of the Artillery Non-Commissioned Officer School (NCO school) and a member of the Artillery Committee.

He remained as the king's aide until August 1893, when he was appointed Marshal of the Royal Court. He served as marshal of the court for almost seven years, until February 1900, when he was appointed commander of the Morava Artillery Regiment. From April 1902 to 1905, he was the commander of the Šumadija divisional area. In the same period, from June 1903 to August 1906, he served as artillery inspector at the Ministry, and until January 1907, was commissioner for border disputes against Turkey. In July 1910, he was detained, together with Colonel Damjan Vlajić, on charges of "improper receipt of ammunition and artillery material". After a long, official stay in France, he retired in February 1911.

== War and last years ==
In the war of 1912, as a reserve officer, he was appointed commander of the 2nd Danube Division. By the decision of 20 October 1912, he was returned to active service and was promoted to the rank of general. He commanded that division in the wars of 1912 and 1913. After the end of the wars, on 1 September 1913, he was appointed dean of the Military Academy, and at the same time, president of the Military Disciplinary Court. He remained in that position until the Austrian Empire declared war on the Kingdom of Serbia when he was immediately appointed commander of the Combined Division of the 1st call-up. He commanded that division until the arrival of the Serbian army in Corfu in January 1916. In Corfu, he was appointed commander of the Timok army. He was appointed a delegate of the Supreme Command of the Serbian Army to the Supreme Command of the French Army on 27 February 1916.

In June 1917, due to organizational changes in the French army, he was appointed to a new position - head of the Serbian military mission in France. He served as representative of the Serbian army with other allies. In the second half of 1917, as a member of the state mission, he went to the United States, with the task of motivating and gathering volunteers for Salonica front. He held that position until February 1918, when he returned to France, as head of the Military Mission. With the reconstruction of the government of Nikola Pašić, he was appointed Minister of War on 24 June 1918. He kept this department in Pašić's new cabinet, from 3 November 1918. In the newly formed cabinet of Stojan Protić, from 7 December 1918, he was again department head and remained in that position until 30 March 1919, when he officially resigned.

On September 20, 1920, he was appointed President of the Board of the Overhaul Fund in the military. At his request, he retired once again on 7 November 1921, though he was transferred to the reserve on 21 October 1923.

Mihailo Rašić died in his family home on 17 February 1932. He was buried in the Belgrade New Cemetery.

== Works ==
- Sa Nj. V. Kraljem Milanom Na Istoku: Putničke Beleške (1891)

== Personal life ==
Rašić married Leposava, the daughter of Gliša Isajlović, a telegraph operator and post office manager. They had three sons: Svetozar, Branivoje, and Dragoljub and three daughters: Katarina, Ružica, and Jelena. His son, Svetozar, born in 1885, was a lawyer, chief of staff to Dr. Voje Marinković and a diplomat. Rašić's daughters Katarina, Ružica, and Jelena were married to General Dragomir Ž. Stojanović, pharmacist Sima Protić, and industrialist Vladimir Đorđević respectfully. Academician's grandson Dimitrije Đorđević (historian) was a professor of history at the University of California, Santa Barbara from 1970 to 1991.

== See also ==
- Ministry of Defence

== Sources ==
- Bjelajac, Mile (2004). Генерали и адмирали Краљевине Југославије 1918—1941 [Generals and admirals of the Kingdom of Yugoslavia 1918—1941] (in Serbian). Belgrade: Institute for Recent History of Serbia. ISBN 978-86-7005-039-6.
- Opačić, Petar (2008). Војвода Живојин Мишић [Duke Zivojin Mišić] (in Serbian) (2nd ed.). Belgrade: БеоСинг. ISBN 978-86-87187-00-9.
