= Petar Pešić =

- Петар Пешић
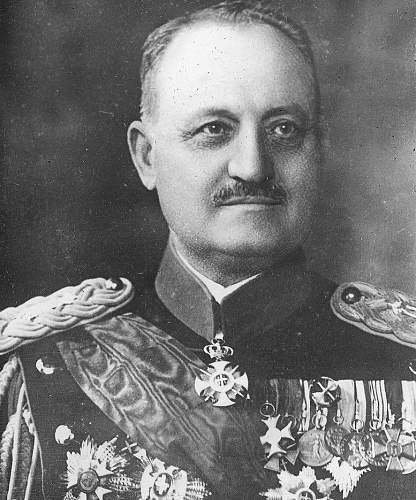

8th and 16th Minister of the Army and Navy of Yugoslavia
- In office 5 January 1922 – 4 November 1922
- Monarch: Aleksandar I
- Prime Minister: Nikola Pašić
- Preceded by: Miloš Vasić
- Succeeded by: Stevan Hadžić
- In office 7 November 1940 – 27 March 1941
- Monarch: Peter II
- Prime Minister: Dragiša Cvetković
- Preceded by: Milan Nedić
- Succeeded by: Bogoljub Ilić

2nd, 4th and 6th Chief of the General Staff of Yugoslavia
- In office 21 January 1921 – 10 March 1921 (Acting)
- Preceded by: Živojin Mišić
- Succeeded by: Petar Bojović
- In office 8 December 1921 – 4 November 1922
- Preceded by: Petar Bojović
- Succeeded by: Milan Milovanović
- In office 30 July 1924 – 11 April 1929
- Prime Minister: Petar Živković
- Preceded by: Milan Milovanović
- Succeeded by: Milan Milovanović

2nd Chief of the Supreme Command of the Kingdom of Montenegro
- In office 20 April 1915 – 20 January 1916
- Monarch: Nicholas I
- Preceded by: Božidar Janković
- Succeeded by: Position abolished

Deputy Chief of the General Staff of the Kingdom of Montenegro
- In office 6 August 1914 – 20 April 1915
- Monarch: Nicholas I
- Chief of the Supreme Command: Božidar Janković
- Chief of the General Staff: Janko Vukotić
- Prime Minister: Janko Vukotić
- Minister of War: Janko Vukotić
- Preceded by: Position created
- Succeeded by: Himself (as Chief of the Supreme Command of the Kingdom of Montenegro)

Personal details
- Born: 26 September 1871 Niš, Kosovo Vilayet, Ottoman Empire
- Died: 6 September 1944 (aged 72) Belgrade, Serbia, Germany
- Spouse: Danica Mostić (m. 1907)
- Education: Military Academy

Military service
- Allegiance: Serbia; Montenegro; Yugoslavia
- Branch: Royal Serbian Army; Royal Montenegrin Army; Royal Yugoslav Army
- Years of service: 1894 – 1929; 1940 – 1941
- Rank: Army general
- Battles/wars: First Balkan War; Second Balkan War; World War I

Petar Pešić (26 September 1871 – 6 September 1944) was a Serbian general and a Sardar of the Kingdom of Montenegro. During his military career, he was the Minister of War, the Chief of the General Staff of the Army of the Kingdom of Yugoslavia and a senator.

== Early career ==
He was born on September 26, 1871, in Niš, as the son of Todor Pešić, merchant and Persida born Krajnalija. He joined the army in 1889, as a cadet of the 22nd class of the lower school of the Military Academy. He continued his education as a cadet of the 5th grade of the Higher School of the Military Academy. After finishing school, he was on an internship in France from 1900 to 1901 . He also completed the General Staff preparation.

He married in 1907 with Danica, daughter of Generals Vasilije and Sofia Mostić. Her family had a sister, Danica, and a brother, Jovan, who was an officer and a cadet of the 32nd class of the Military Academy.

== Active service ==
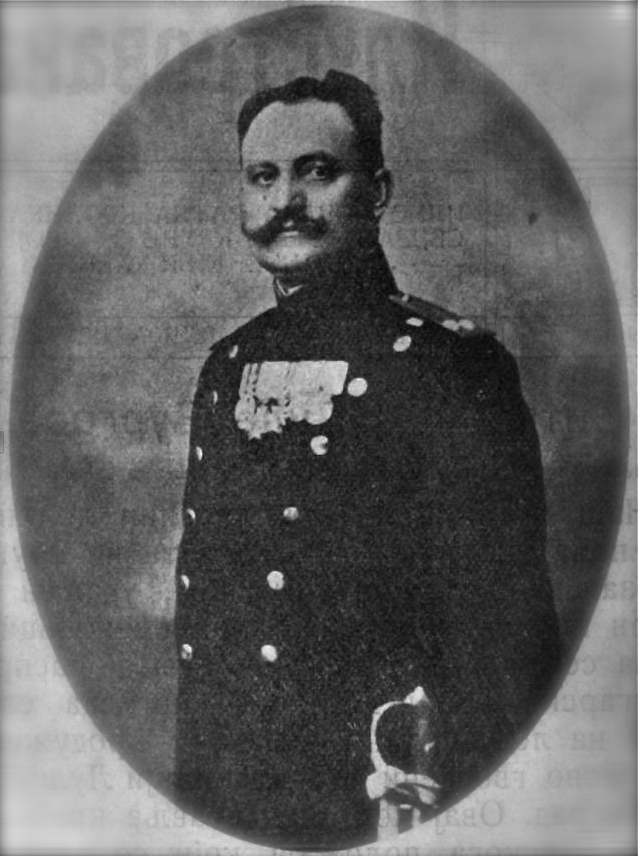
Colonel Petar Pesic at the headquarters of the 1st Army

After graduating in 1892, he was promoted to the rank of artillery lieutenant and the first schedule was determined in 1894 to become sergeant in artillery. He was then elected Commander-in-Chief of the Active Army of Milan I on October 15, 1897. After the departure of King Milan from his position, he continued his service as an ordinance officer of King Aleksandar Obrenović from July 29 to December 7, 1900. He was Chief of Staff of the Moravian Divisional Area from 1901 to 1903. On April 10, 1903, he was appointed acting commander of the 2nd Battalion of the 7th Infantry Regiment, and on October 6 of the same year he was transferred to the position of Adjutant Chief of the General Staff. He was appointed Chief of Staff of the Timok Divisional Area on April 10, 1904, and after that only a few months later on June 30, he was appointed commander of the 2nd Battalion of the 20th Infantry Regiment. In addition to his regular duties, he was an assistant professor of Tactics from October 29, 1904, at the Military Academy. From 1904 until 1912, he was a member of the Central Committee for Border Actions. He continued his service as the Chief of Staff of the Danube Divisional Area and the commander of the artillery battalion. He spent six years in that position from 1904 to 1910. During that period, in addition to his regular duties, he was appointed on May 14, 1906, for the ordinance of Prince George and January 29, 1907. and for a full professor of Tactics at the Military Academy to Prince in 1910. After these duties, he became commander of the infantry regiment. He was the Adjutant General of the Army from March 3, 1911, until 1912.

== The Balkan Wars and World War I ==
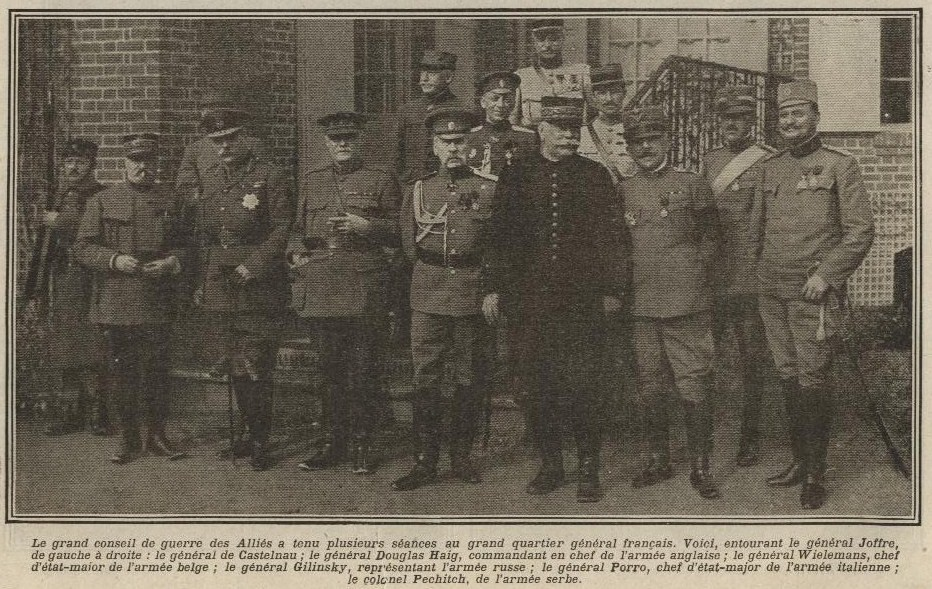
Conference delegates of the Allied supreme command in 1916. (Petar Pesic is first on the right.)

During the Balkan Wars, he was appointed Assistant Chief of Staff of the First Army (one of three field armies). In September 1912, he was sent to Lucerne to make an agreement on military cooperation with Montenegro for the war against Ottoman Empire, around May 1913. On 10 September he was sent to Greece to conclude a military convention for the war against Bulgaria, and on September 10, he was sent to Athens as a military envoy and remained in that position until July 28, 1914.

During World War I, he was sent to Montenegro, and on July 29, 1914, he was appointed Assistant Chief of Staff of the Montenegrin Supreme Command. Following the resignation of General Božidar Janković on April 20, 1915, the Supreme Command appointed Colonel Pešić Chief of Staff of the Montenegrin Supreme Command and delegate of the Serbian Supreme Command in Montenegro. He remained in that position until January 20, 1916, after which he was appointed Assistant Chief of Staff of the Serbian Supreme Command. During that period, from January to February, he was sent as a delegate to Chantillyto the Conference of Delegates of the Allied High Command to arrange for the Royal Serbian Army to be rearmed and equipped.

== Service in Yugoslavia and political career ==
After the end of the war, from January to September, he was appointed head of the military mission to the Yugoslav delegation at the 1919 Paris Peace Conference. On September 20, 1919, he was appointed Deputy Chief of Staff of the Supreme Command, and from May 6, 1920, appointed Assistant and Deputy Chief of Staff. On March 10, 1921, he was appointed Commander of the Sava Divisional Area, then on July 20, transferred to Assistant Commander of the IV Army District, and on December 8 of the same year, became Chief of the General Staff. In Pasic's governments since November 4, 1922 until July 30, 1924, was appointed Minister of the Army and Navy. After that, he was re-appointed Chief of the General Staff and Honorary Adjutant of the King. He remained in that position until April 11, 1929, when he retired.

He became an ambassador to Belgium on April 20, 1929, and on April 4, 1930, an ambassador to Czechoslovakia. It was again on March 15, 1931, he was returned as an ambassador to Belgium and remained in that position until February 28, 1935. After these functions, he lost his job for four years. He became a royal senator in 1939. He returned from retirement on November 7, 1940, and again appointed in the government of Dragiša Cvetković as Minister of the Army and Navy. In this government, he made the decision to join the Axis powers because the Royal Yugoslav Army was not ready to confront the Germans. With the Yugoslav coup d'état of March 27, 1941, he was removed from his position and retired again. After the Invasion of Yugoslavia, he remained politically passive and spent the occupation in Belgrade.

=== Death ===
He and his wife died on September 6, 1944, during the Allied bombing of Belgrade. He was buried in the Belgrade New Cemetery.

== Awards ==
- Order of Karađorđe's Star, with swords, III and IV Degrees
- Order of the White Eagle, IV Degree
- Order of St. Sava, III Degree
- Order of the Cross of Takovo, IV Degree

=== Foreign Awards ===
- France: Legion of Honour
- Russia: Order of Saint Stanislaus

== Works ==
- Rešavanje taktičkih zadataka, Belgrade, 1900
- Elementi taktike i takičke radnje, 1904
- Taktika konjice, 1906
- Duh savremenog ratovanja, 1910
- Srpska taktika, 1912
- Taktika I i II, Belgrade 1921
- Solunski front i vojnopolitička akcija, Belgrade 1921
- Proboj Solunskog fronta, 1922
- Naš rat sa Turcima 1876—1877. godine, 1925
