= Milan Milovanović (general) =

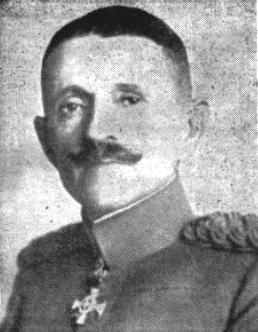

Minister of the Army, Navy and Air Force
- In office 18 April 1934 – 22 October 1934
- Prime Minister: Nikola Uzunović
- Preceded by: Dragomir Stojanović
- Succeeded by: Petar Živković

Personal details
- Born: 15 May 1874 Šetonje, Principality of Serbia
- Died: 1942 (aged 67–68) Belgrade, Yugoslavia

Milan Milovanović was a Yugoslav Army general (Kingdom of Yugoslavia) Armijski đeneral who was acting Chief of the General Staff of the Royal Yugoslav Army from 1922 to 1924 and Chief of the General Staff between 1929 and 1934. He was briefly Minister for Army and Navy between April and October 1934, and was appointed as senior member of the Military Council in 1935.

== Career ==
Milovanović was born in Šetonje in the Požarevac region of Serbia in 1874. He entered the Military Academy in 1891 and was commissioned into the infantry in 1894. He attended training in France in 1903. In August 1912, he joined a secret society called the Black Hand. From 1910 to 1912 he was chief of the intelligence section of the Serbian General Staff, and he was a professor of tactics at the Serbian Military Academy until 1919. During the Balkan Wars and World War I he held several staff positions and was attached to the French Supreme Command as the Serbian representative during 1917 and 1918. In 1922 he became the first assistant to the Chief of the General Staff of the Royal Yugoslav Army, Petar Pešić. Between 1922 and 1924, he acted as Chief of the General Staff while Pešić was Minister for the Army and Navy, and later commanded the 5th Army at Niš. In April 1929 he was appointed as Chief of the General Staff but relinquished this position when he was appointed as Minister for Army and Navy in April 1934. In October 1934, he was replaced by Petar Živković as Minister for Army and Navy after the assassination of King Alexander, as he was not considered strong enough to perform the role. He was appointed as the senior member of the Military Council in 1935. He was considered a particularly capable officer when he was younger.

== Sources ==
=== Books ===
- Jarman, Robert L., ed. (1997b). Yugoslavia Political Diaries 1918–1965. Vol. 2. Slough, Berkshire: Archives Edition. ISBN 978-1-85207-950-5.
- Jarman, Robert L., ed. (1997c). Yugoslavia Political Diaries 1918–1965. Vol. 3. Slough, Berkshire: Archives Edition. ISBN 978-1-85207-950-5.
