= Bogoljub Ilić =

Serbian general (1881–1956)

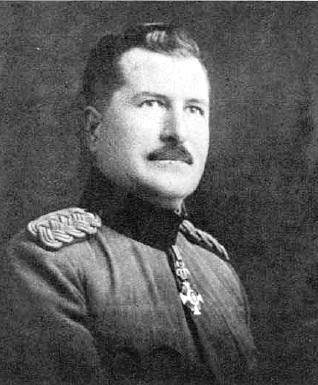

Minister of the Army, Navy and Air Force
- In office 27 March 1941 – 11 January 1942
- Preceded by: Petar Pešić
- Succeeded by: Dragoljub Mihailović

Personal details
- Born: 22 February 1881 Požarevac, Principality of Serbia
- Died: 23 April 1956 (aged 75) Belgrade, FPR Yugoslavia

Bogoljub Ilić (Serbian Cyrillic: Богољуб Илић; 22 February 1881 – 23 April 1956) was a Serbian army general (Note: equivalent to a U.S. Army lieutenant general.) with the Royal Yugoslav Army who was briefly Minister for the Army and Navy prior and during the German-led Axis invasion of Yugoslavia in April 1941. He was then Minister of the Army and Navy in exile from August 1941 to January 1942.

== Career ==
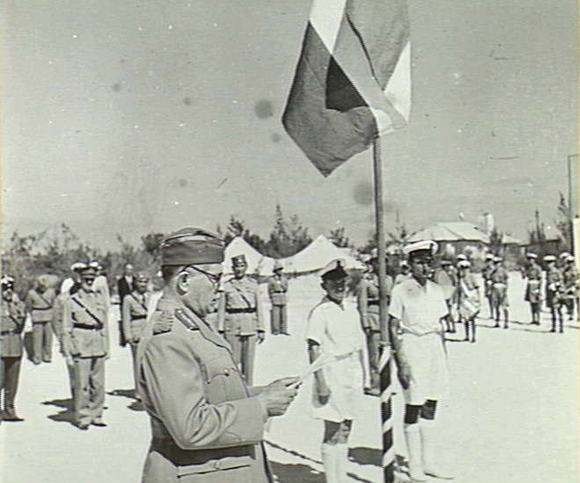
Bogoljub Ilić making a speech at the swearing in of new Yugoslav recruits in Egypt, September 1941

Milovanović was born in Požarevac, Serbia in 1881. He was commissioned in 1900 and held several staff positions during the Balkan Wars and World War I. He was promoted to brigadni đeneral in 1925, after which he served in a variety of appointments, including chief of staff of the 5th Army, commander of the 1st Cavalry Division, and 2nd Deputy Chief of the General Staff. In September 1936, he was appointed to command the 2nd Army at Sarajevo.
