= Križovljan =

- Village
- Location of Križovljan in Croatia
- Coordinates: 46°15′50″N 16°33′25″E
- Country: Croatia
- County: Varaždin County
- Municipality: Martijanec

Area
  - Total: 3.8 km^{2} (1.5 sq mi)

Population (2021)
  - Total: 234
  - Density: 62/km^{2} (160/sq mi)
- Time zone: UTC+1 (CET)
  - Summer (DST): UTC+2 (CEST)
- Postal code: 42230 Ludbreg
- Area code: +385 (0)42

Križovljan is a village in Croatia. It is connected by the D2 highway.
