= Martijanec =

- Municipality
- Location of Martijanec in Croatia
- Coordinates: 46°16′N 16°32′E
- Country: Croatia
- County: Varaždin County

Government
  - Municipal mayor: Marijan Horvat

Area
  - Municipality: 49.1 km^{2} (19.0 sq mi)
  - Urban: 2.9 km^{2} (1.1 sq mi)

Population (2021)
  - Municipality: 2,638
  - Density: 53.7/km^{2} (139/sq mi)
  - Urban: 347
  - Urban density: 120/km^{2} (310/sq mi)
- Time zone: UTC+1 (CET)
  - Summer (DST): UTC+2 (CEST)
- Postal code: 42232 Donji Martijanec
- Area code: +385 (0)42
- Website: opcina-martijanec.hr

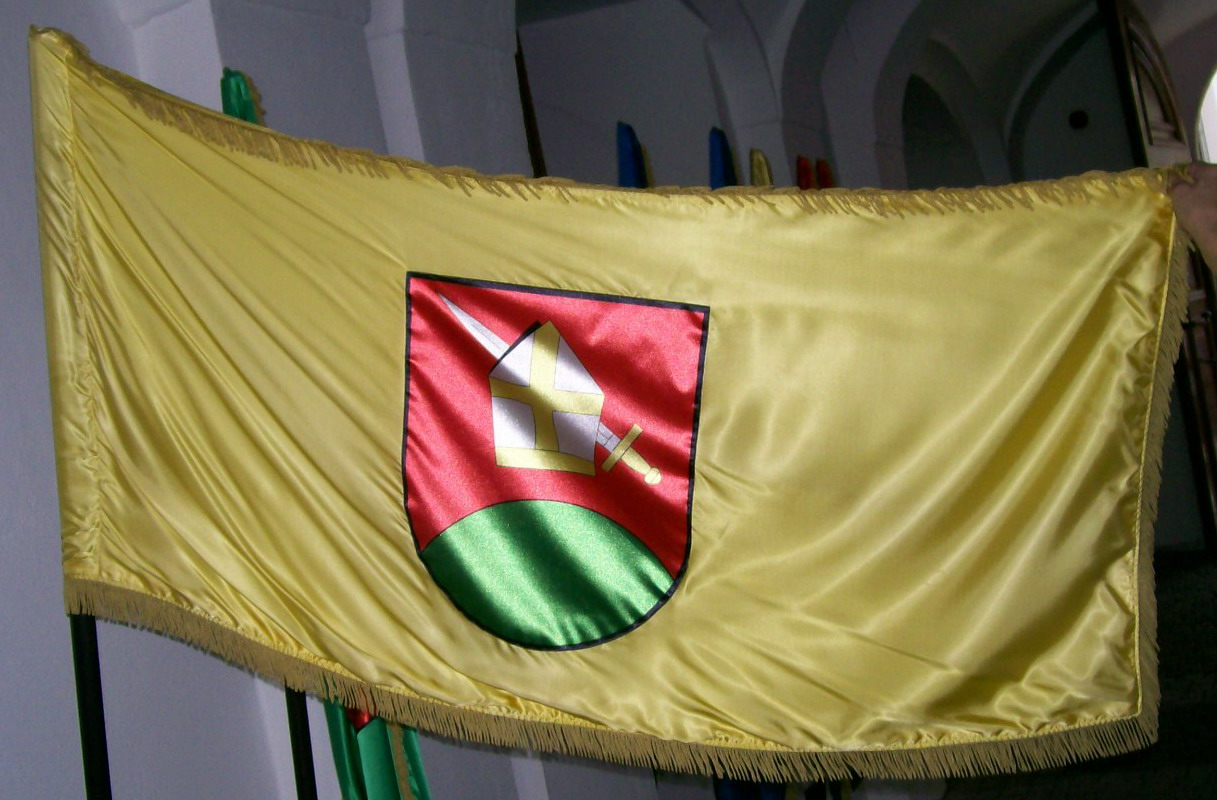
Flag of Municipality of Martijanec

Martijanec is a Croatian village and municipality in Varaždin County.

According to the 2011 census, there are 3,843 inhabitants in the municipality, in the following settlements:

- Čičkovina, population 206
- Gornji Martijanec, population 44
- Hrastovljan, population 410
- Križovljan, population 288
- Madaraševec, population 204
- Martijanec, population 423
- Poljanec, population 716
- Rivalno, population 51
- Slanje, population 512
- Sudovčina, population 360
- Vrbanovec, population 629
