= Šetonje =

- Village
- Location within Serbia
- Coordinates: 44°16′12″N 21°28′37″E
- Country: Serbia
- District: Braničevo District
- Municipality: Petrovac na Mlavi
- Time zone: UTC+1 (CET)
  - Summer (DST): UTC+2 (CEST)

Šetonje is a village situated in Petrovac na Mlavi municipality in Serbia. Significant number of residents historically moved to Innsbruck in Austria where they worked as factory employees.
