= Miloje Zečević =

Yugoslav minister of defence

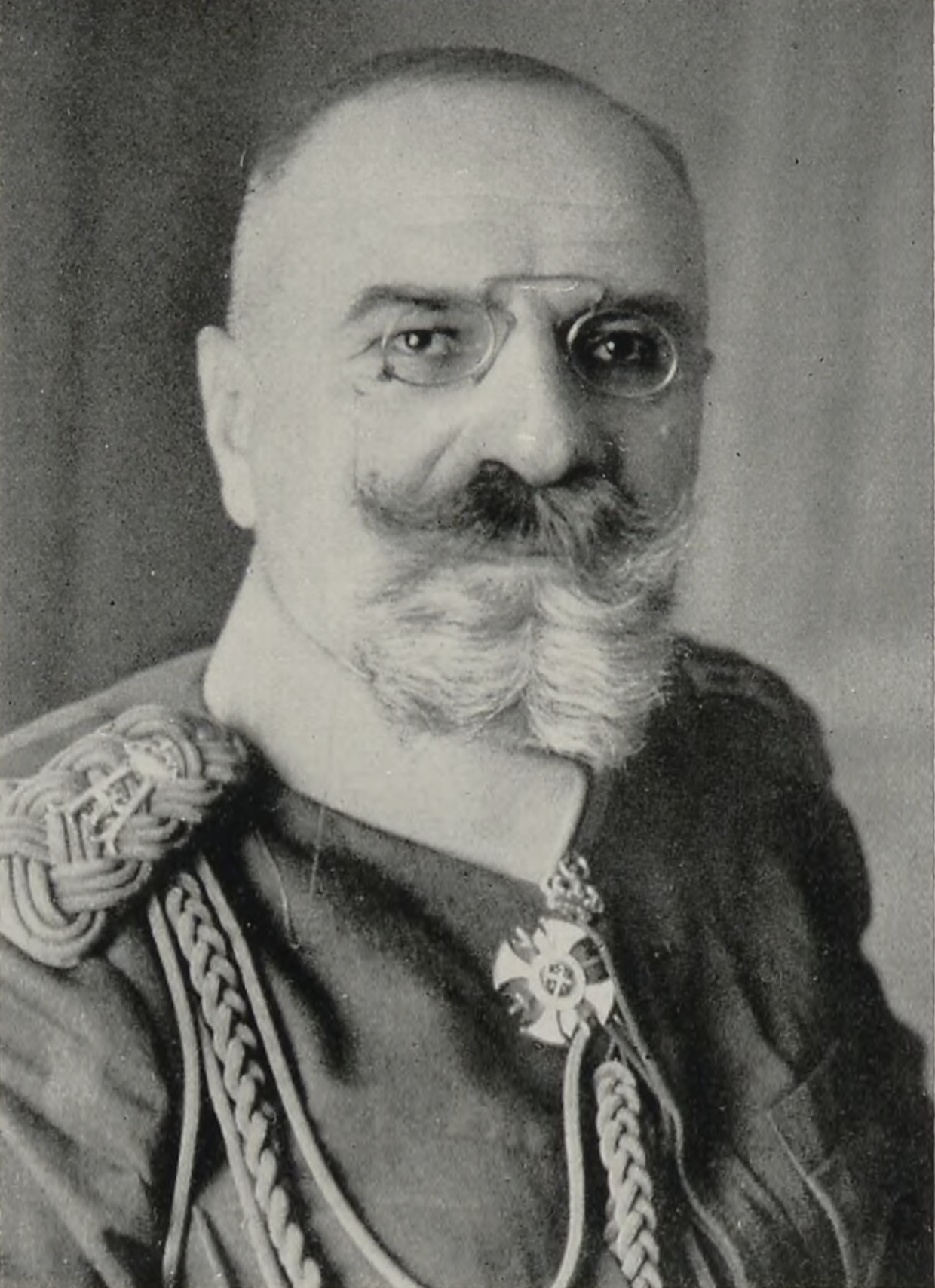
Miloje Zečević

Miloje Zečević (Serbian Cyrillic: Милоје Зечевић; 1872–1946) was a high-ranking military officer in 1917 who belonged to the White Hand, along with his comrade-in-arms Mirko Milisavljević. Miloje Zečević also served as Minister of Defence, that is Minister of the Army and Navy of the Yugoslav government from 20 July 1921 to 3 January 1922. He was killed right after World War II by Yugoslav Partisans in 1946.
