= Branko Jovanović =

Serbian Field Marshal (1868-1921)

Branko Jovanović Бранко Јовановић
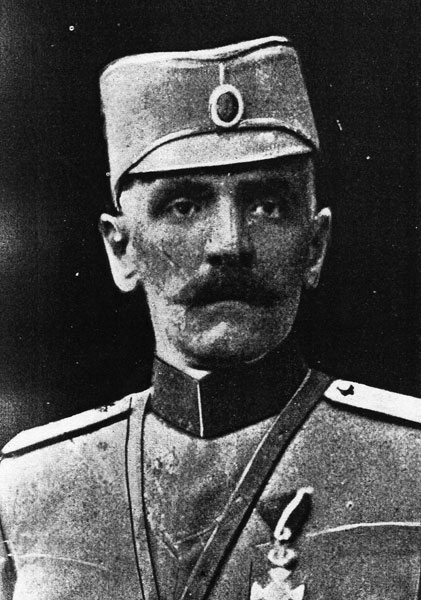
- Born: December 14, 1868; Belgrade, Serbia
- Died: April 29, 1921 (aged 52); Belgrade, Belgrade Oblast, Yugoslavia
- Education: Military Academy
- Military career
- Allegiance: Principality of Serbia; Kingdom of Serbia
- Branch: Armed forces of the Principality of Serbia; Royal Serbian Army
- Service years: 1885–1921
- Rank: Vojvoda
- Conflicts: Serbo-Bulgarian War; First Balkan War; World War I

Branko Jovanović (Serbian: Бранко Јовановић; Belgrade, Principality of Serbia, 14 December 1868 – Belgrade, Kingdom of Serbs, Croats and Slovenes, 29 April 1921) was a general of the Royal Serbian Army and the Royal Yugoslav Army, Commander of the Cavalry Division in World War I, lecturer at the Military Academy and five-time Minister of the Army and navy of the Kingdoms of Serbs, Croats and Slovenes.

== Biography ==
Branko Jovanović was born on 14 December 1868 in Belgrade, as the son of the head of the Ministry of Construction, Nikola Jovanović and Stanka, a descendant of a respected Serbian merchant family of Baba-Dudići. He graduated from the 1st Belgrade Gymnasium in 1885 and enrolled in the Artillery School of the Military Academy in Belgrade. He fought in the Serbo-Bulgarian War as a 17-year-old cadet. He graduated from the academy in 1888 and received the rank of lieutenant.

He continued his education at the Higher School of the Military Academy, which he completed in 1892. The following year he was appointed adjutant of the cavalry regiment, and from 1894 to 1897. He attended the General Staff Training in the Russian Empire at the prestigious Saint Petersburg Military Engineering-Technical University-Nikolaevsky (Russian: Санкт-Петербургский Военный инженерно-технический университет, VITU), previously known as the Saint Petersburg Nikolaevsky Engineering Academy, which was established in 1810 under Alexander I.

As a major, he was transferred to the General Staff profession and received command over an infantry battalion. Between 1900 and 1901, he was the chief of staff of the divisional area, and then he became an assistant and commander of the cavalry regiment.

Branko Jovanović took part in the May Coup in 1903 and the murder of King Aleksandar Obrenović and Queen Draga. For a time he was aide-de-camp of King Petar Karađorđević until 1904. However, he remained the teacher of George, Crown Prince of Serbia.

Since 1907, he commanded a cavalry brigade. At the beginning of the First Balkan War of 1912, he was appointed commander of the Cavalry Division. Due to his serious health condition, he did not take office, so Prince Arsen Karađorđević became the commander instead.

In World War I, he commanded the Cavalry Division until January 1918, when he was hospitalized.

After the war, he commanded the Morava Divisional Area from 1918 to 1919.

Jovanović became Minister of the Army and Navy on 19 February 1920. and held that positions in the Cabinet of Stojan Protić II, Cabinet of Milenko Radomar Vesnić I and II, Cabinet of Nikola Pašić XIII and XIV for a total of five times.

He died on 29 April 1921 in Belgrade from a heart attack.
