= Vrbanovec =

- Village
- Location of Vrbanovec in Croatia
- Coordinates: 46°16′N 16°31′E
- Country: Croatia
- County: Varaždin County
- Municipality: Martijanec

Area
  - Total: 4.9 km^{2} (1.9 sq mi)

Population (2021)
  - Total: 561
  - Density: 110/km^{2} (300/sq mi)
- Time zone: UTC+1 (CET)
  - Summer (DST): UTC+2 (CEST)
- Postal code: 42230 Ludbreg
- Area code: +385 (0)42

Vrbanovec is a village in Croatia. It is connected by the D2 highway.
