= Seketin =

Coordinates: 46°13′43.6″N 16°19′34.4″E

- Village
- Interactive map of Seketin
- Country: Croatia

Area
  - Total: 1.0 sq mi (2.6 km^{2})

Population (2021)
  - Total: 348
  - Density: 350/sq mi (130/km^{2})
- Time zone: UTC+1 (CET)
  - Summer (DST): UTC+2 (CEST)

Seketin is a village in Croatia.
