= Marshal of Yugoslavia =

Highest rank of the Yugoslav People's Army

Marshal of Yugoslavia: Maršal Jugoslavije / Маршал Југославије (Serbo-Croatian); Maršal Jugoslavije (Slovene); Маршал на Југославија (Macedonian)
- Shoulder boards for the Ground Forces, Air Force and the Navy.
- Country: Yugoslavia
- Service branch: Yugoslav People's Army
- Rank: Special grade
- Formation: 30 November 1943
- Abolished: 4 May 1980
- Next lower rank: General (1955–1974); General of the army (1946–1955, 1974–1992)

Marshal of Yugoslavia was the highest military distinction, rather than a military rank of the Yugoslav People's Army. In military hierarchy it has special equivalent and simultaneously it was Yugoslav honorific title.

== History of the rank ==
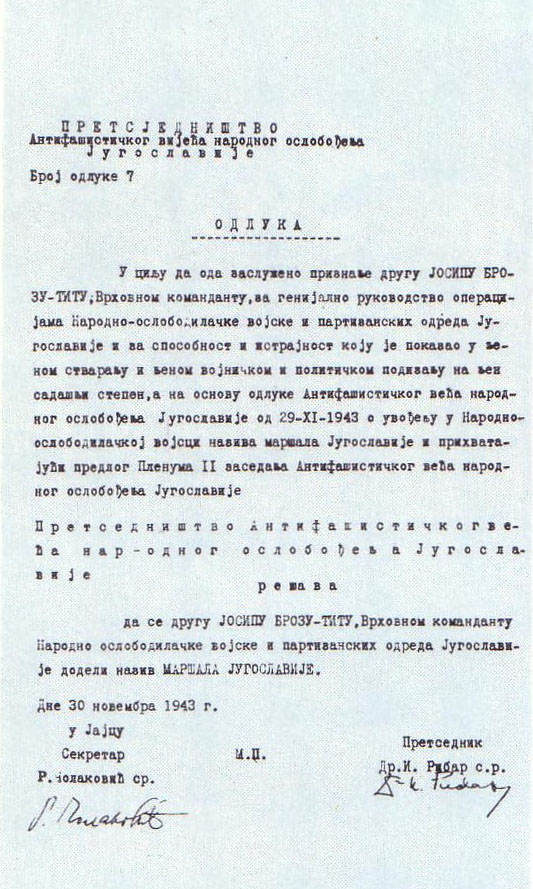
AVNOJ decision on promoting Tito to the rank of Marshal of Yugoslavia, signed by Ivan Ribar and Rodoljub Čolaković

The only person to ever hold the title of "Marshal of Yugoslavia" was Josip Broz Tito, with the term "Marshal" becoming synonymous with his name in Yugoslavia. He received it at the second session of AVNOJ in the Bosnian town of Jajce on 30 November 1943, and held it until his death on 4 May 1980. Tito had more than 70 different marshal uniforms.

== Personnel assigned to the Marshal of Yugoslavia ==
=== Adjutants ===
No.	Portrait	Name	Tenure
Personal escorts
1		Jaša Rajter	1941
2		Boško Čolić	1941–1943
Adjutants
1		Major Boško Čolić	1943–1945
2		Colonel general Milan Žeželj	1945–1962
3		Major general Luka Božović	1962–1966
4		Lt. Col. General Đuka Balenović	1966–1971
5		Major general Anđelko Valter	1971–1973
6		Lt. Col. General Marko Rapo	1973–1977
7		Vice admiral Tihomir Vilović	1977–1979
8		Counter admiral Zvonimir Kostić	1979

=== Chiefs of the Cabinet ===
No.	Portrait	Name	Tenure
1		Lt. Col. General Mitar Bakić	1944–1945
2		Major general Ljubodrag Đurić	1945–1949
3		Colonel general Miloš Šumonja	1949–1967
4		Colonel general Bruno Vuletić	1967–1979
5		Counter admiral Zvonimir Kostić	1979–1980

== Gallery ==
Sleeve insignia of the rank of Marshal of Yugoslavia from the National Liberation War, used 1943–1946.

Sleeve insignia of the rank of Marshal of Yugoslavia for the Air Force, used 1946–1980.

Sleeve insignia of the rank of Marshal of Yugoslavia for the Navy, used 1946–1953. Insignia was abolished in 1953.

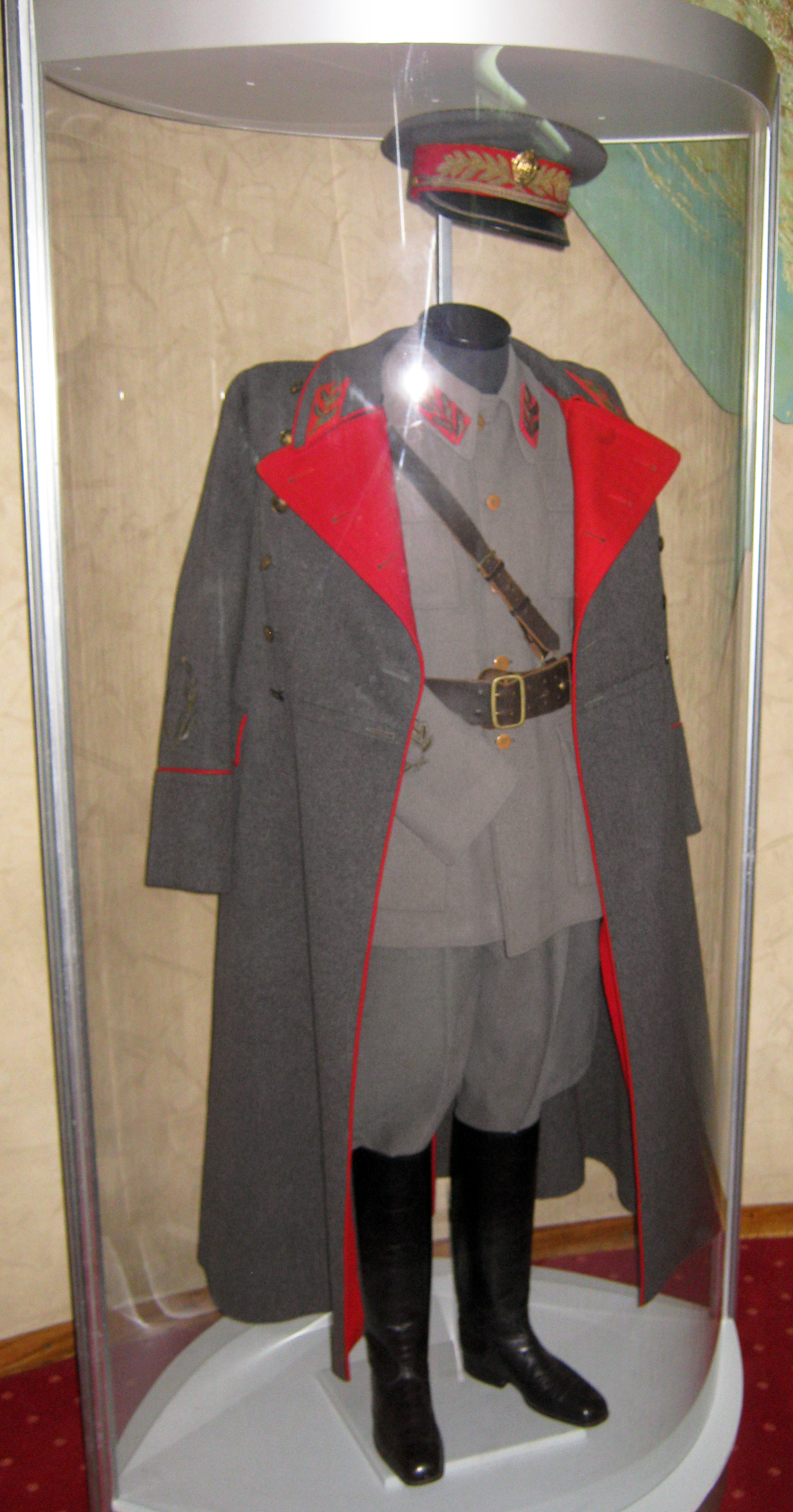
The first Marshal uniform from the National Liberation War.

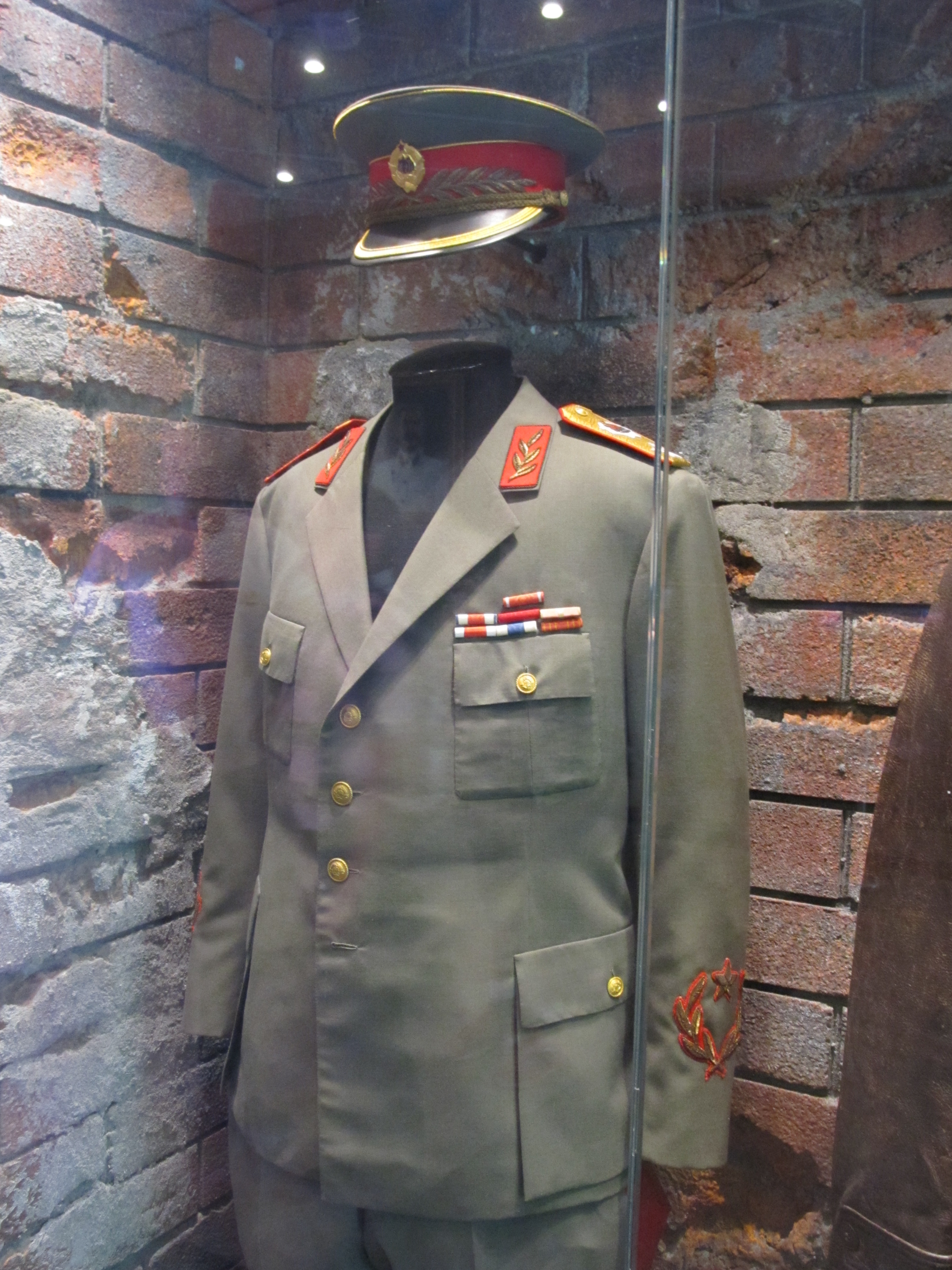
Marshal uniform of the Ground Forces.

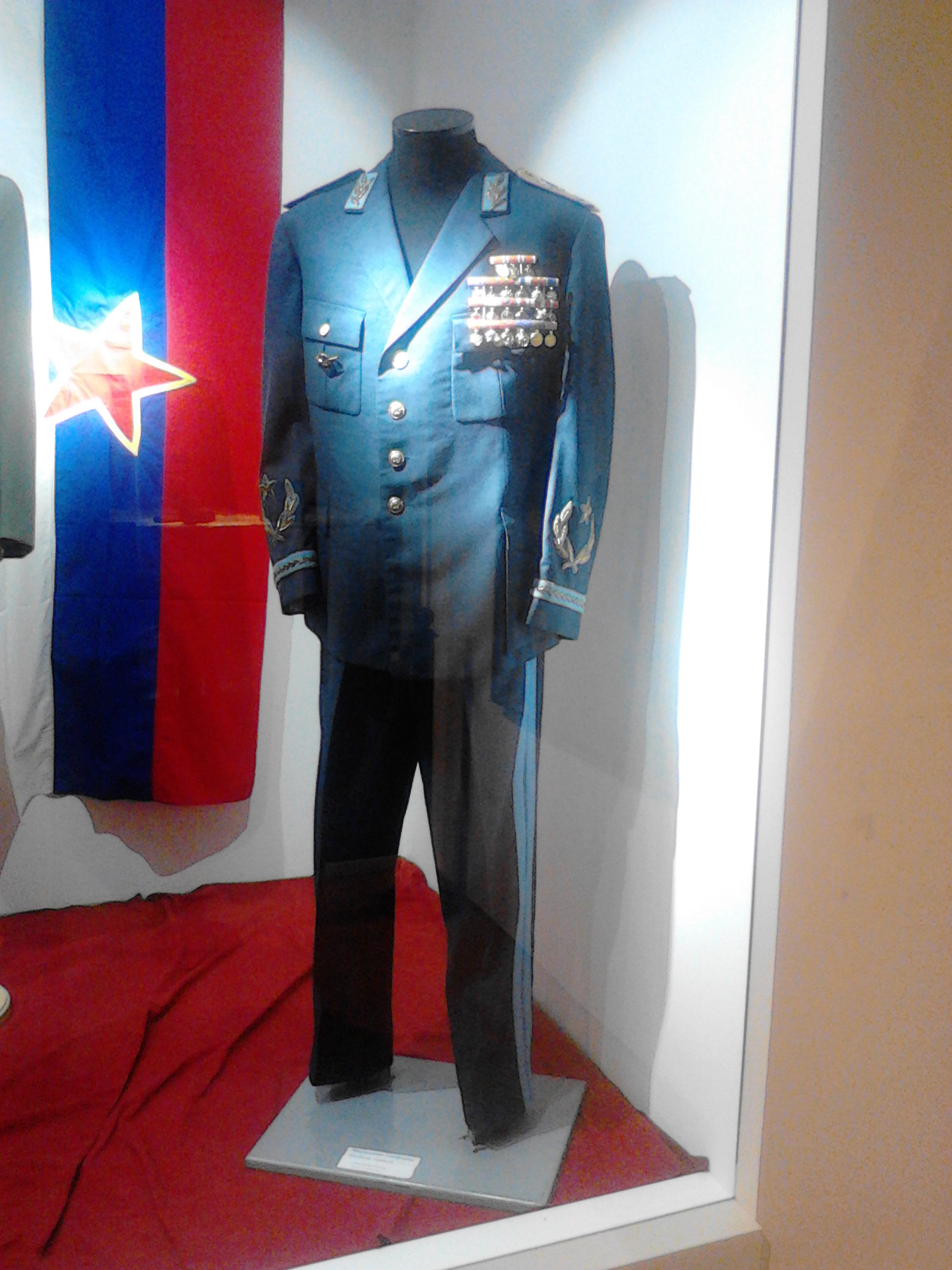
Marshal uniform of the Air Force.

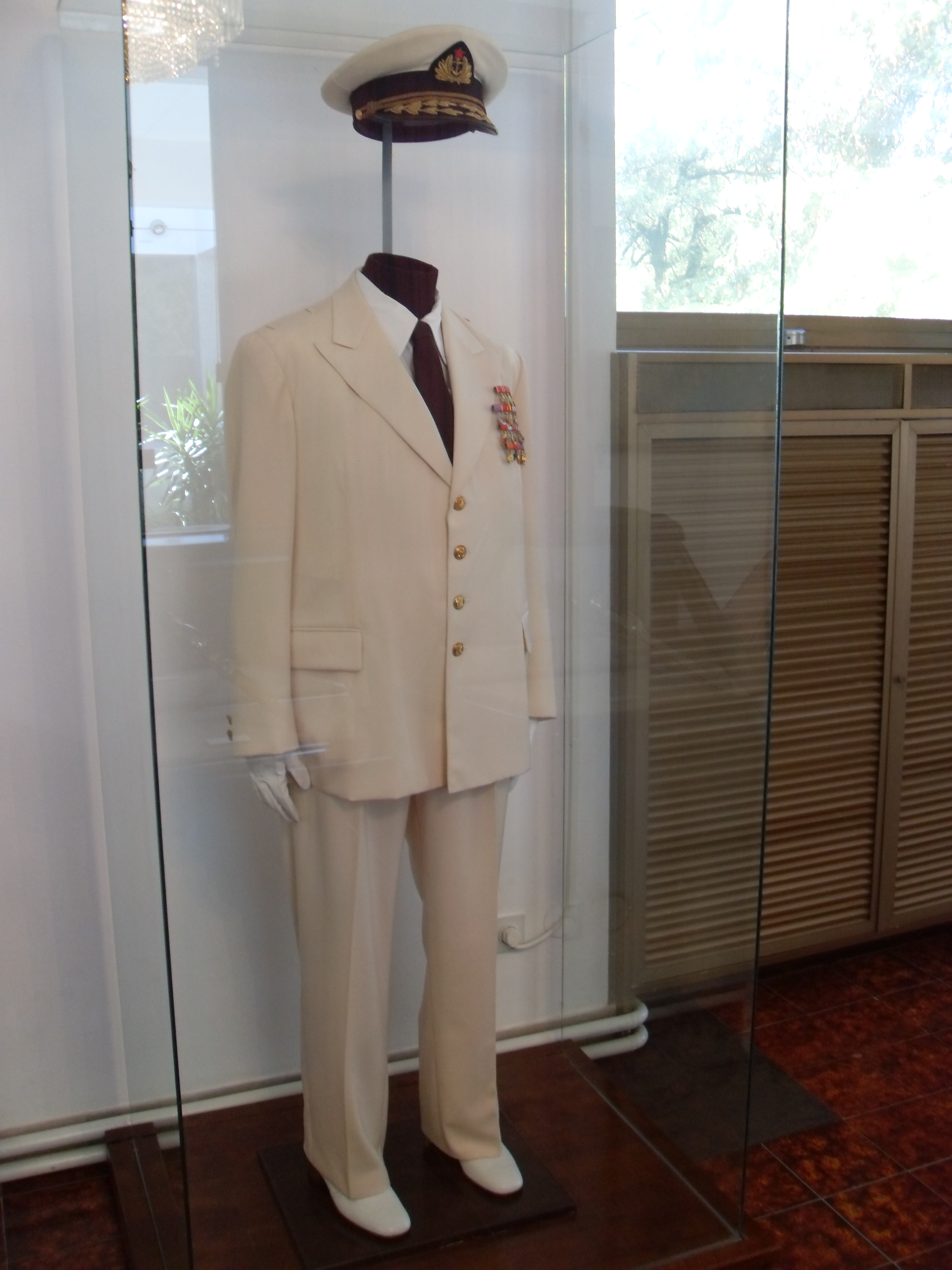
Marshal uniform of the Navy.

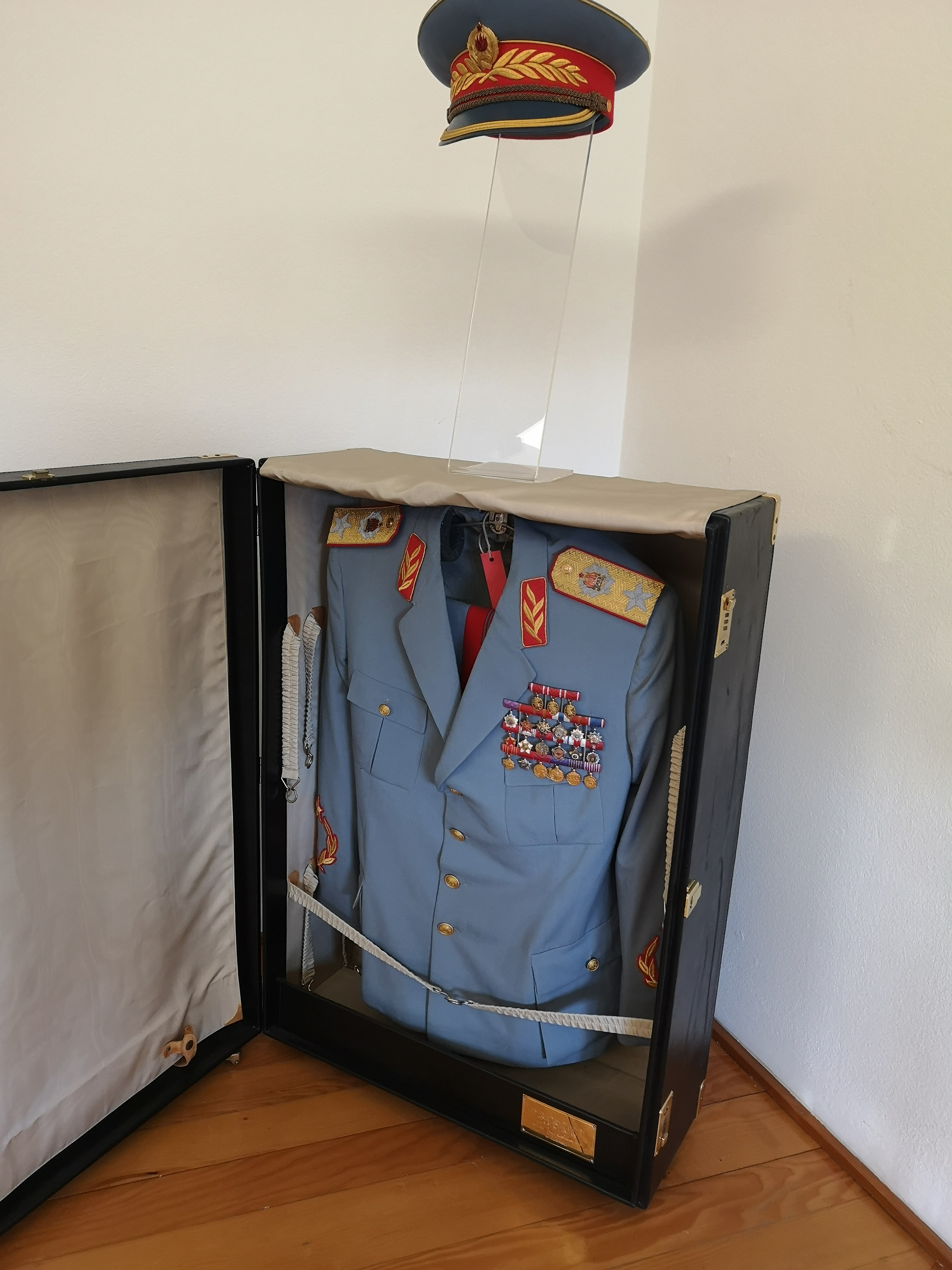
Marshal uniform of the Guard.

== See also ==
- Uz maršala Tita
