= Borisav Ristić =

Serbian soldier

- Nickname: Bora
- Allegiance: Kingdom of Serbia; Kingdom of Yugoslavia
- Branch: Serbian Army; Royal Yugoslav Army
- Service years: –1940; 1941; 1944–1945
- Conflicts: World War I

Borisav "Bora" Ristić (31 December 1883 – 30 October 1967) was a high-ranking officer of the Serbian Army. For a short time, he held the post of the Minister of the Army, Navy and Air Force in the Yugoslav government-in-exile, in the cabinet of Ivan Šubašić.

== Active service ==
After finishing education, Ristić's first assignment was that of a sergeant in the Second Infantry Regiment, in 1905. On 28 February 1908, he became a sergeant in the Sixth Infantry Regiment. In the Balkan Wars from 1912 to 1913, he was appointed commander of the 4th Company of the 3rd Battalion, 7th Infantry Regiment of the 1st call. On this duty he was wounded on 19 September 1913 at Galičnik during an Albanian rebellion. On 27 December 1913, he was appointed commander of the 3rd Company of the 2nd Battalion, 11th Infantry Regiment. After the Balkan Wars, until the mobilization of 1914, Ristić worked on mapping new areas liberated in the Balkan Wars. In World War I from 1914 to 1918, during the mobilization he was appointed commander of the railway station Vlaško Polje. From 26 August 1914 he was appointed assistant chief of staff of the Morava Division of the 2nd call. During 1916 and up to 1918 he was appointed assistant chief of staff of the Morava Division and held this position until the end of war.

After the end of World War I, on 24 March 1919 Ristić was appointed assistant and deputy chief of staff of the Osijek Divisional District. On 18 August 1919 he was transferred to the post of chief of staff of Banat troops, and on 20 September of the same year he was stationed at the headquarters of the First Army District. On 20 May 1920, he was transferred to headquarters of the Kosovo Divisional District for the General Staff tasks, and on 14 November he was transferred to the General Staff work. He became chief of staff of the Drina Divisional District on 24 November 1921. On 1 April 1925, he was appointed assistant to chief of staff of the First Army District, and on 6 April of the same year he was moved to the post of commander of the 51st Infantry Regiment. On 19 March 1926, he was re-appointed assistant to chief of staff of the First Army District. On 7 August 1929, he was designated acting chief of staff of the Fifth Army District. Afterwards, he was acting chief of staff of the Morava Divisional Area before he was appointed chief of staff on 23 September 1932, and he held this post for almost two years. He was appointed assistant to the Inspector of ground defense 14 September 1934, and a year later, on 14 October 1935, he was moved to the post of commander of the Osijek Divisional District. On 27 November 1937, he was re-appointed assistant to the Inspector of ground defense. While serving on this duty, as his personal request, he was retired on 28 September 1940 and transferred to the reserve.

After the outbreak of the April War in 1941, Ristić was reactivated from the reserve and was appointed commander of the Mura Divisional District. From captivity, he returned to Belgrade, escaped to the Partisan-held territory and with help of the NKOJ he went to Italy under the control of the Allies. He put himself at the disposal of the Allies and with British help he moved to London where he reported to the Yugoslav government-in-exile. Upon hearing of his arrival, and since the Yugoslav Army outside the Homeland no longer had active generals, on 11 September 1944 he was offered the post of the Minister of the Army, Navy and Air Force in the cabinet of Ivan Šubašić. Ristić accepted this offer and several months later, on 26 January 1945, he resigned and returned to Yugoslavia together with retired Army General Dušan Simović.

== Literature ==
- Bjelajac, Mile S. (2004). Generals and admirals of the Kingdom of Yugoslavia from 1918 to 1941. Institute for Recent History of Serbia. ISBN 86-7005-039-0.

Political offices
| Preceded by Dragoljub Mihailović | Minister of the Army, Navy and Air Force of the Yugoslav government-in-exile 1944–1945 | Succeeded by Josip Broz Tito as Defence Minister of Yugoslavia |
