= General (Yugoslav People's Army) =

General of the Yugoslav People's Army General Jugoslovenske narodne armije
- Country: Yugoslavia
- Service branch: Yugoslav Ground Forces; Yugoslav Air Force
- Rank: Five-star rank
- Non-NATO rank: OF-10
- Formation: 1955
- Abolished: 1974
- Next higher rank: Marshal of Yugoslavia
- Next lower rank: General of the army Fleet admiral

Related articles
- History: Vojvoda

General (YPA) or General (JNA) (Serbo-Croatian: General Jugoslovenske narodne armije, Генерал Југословенске народне армије, Slovene: General Jugoslovanske ljudske armade) was the highest rank of Yugoslav People's Army (in theory the second highest, after Marshal of Yugoslavia which was created for Josip Broz Tito and held by him alone). The only person to ever considered for promotion in rank of "General" was Ivan Gošnjak as deputy supreme commander. This rank was created in 1955 and it was abolished in 1974. After that the highest rank of Yugoslav People's Army was Army general for Yugoslav Ground Forces and Yugoslav Air Force, and Fleet admiral for Yugoslav Navy.

== Bibliography ==
- Military Lexicon. Belgrade: Yugoslav People Army. 1981.
