= General officer =

Military rank

A general officer is an officer of high rank in the armies, and in some nations' air and space forces, marines or naval infantry. (Note: Within NATO rank structure, all branches (navy included) are referred to as general officers. In the United States, General Officers authorized to display a flag showing their rank are also called "flag officers". Refer: "Flag officer". Merriam-Webster.. In other usages the term "flag officer" usually applies to naval ranks such as admiral, vice-admiral, or rear-admiral.)

In some usages, the term "general officer" refers to a rank above colonel.

== General officer ranks ==
The adjective general had been affixed to officer designations since late medieval Europe (14th-15th Centuries) title capitaine général (French) or captain general (English) appeared in the 14-15 Centuries, meaning "captain who had general command of the army".

The various grades of general officer are at the top of the military rank structure. Lower-ranking officers are typically known as field officers or field-grade officers, and below them are company-grade officers.

=== Common systems ===
There are two common systems of general ranks used worldwide. In addition, there is a third system, the Arab system of ranks, which is used throughout the Middle East and North Africa.

In the old European system, general officer ranks are named by prefixing "general", as an adjective, with field officer ranks. Although in some countries, the highest general officers are titled field marshal or marshal.

The other is derived from the French Revolution, where generals' ranks are named according to the unit they (theoretically) command.

==== Old European ====
- Field marshal or marshal
- Colonel general
- General
- Lieutenant general
- Major general
- Brigadier or brigadier general

The system uses either a brigadier general or a colonel general rank (i.e. exclude one of the italicised ranks.

==== French Revolutionary ====
- Marshal or Captain general
- Army general
- Corps general
- Divisional general
- Brigade general

==== Arab ====
Rank	Transliteration	Translation	Notes
مشير	Mushīr	Counsellor	compare Counsellor of State, State Counsellor etc. compare etymology "mushir" with "shura"
فريق أول	Fariq 'awal	First general	equivalent to Commonwealth "full" general
فريق	Fariq	General	equivalent to lieutenant general
لواء	liwāʾ	Ensign	(more loosely "flag officer" or "banner")
عميد	ʿamīd	Colonel (not to be confused with aqīd, the equivalent rank to a Commonwealth colonel)	compare etymology with "ʿamood" ("column"); etymologically, translates as "colonel" but equivalent to brigadier/brigade general

=== Other variations ===
Other nomenclatures for general officers include the titles and ranks:

- Adjutant general
- Commandant-general
- Inspector general
- General-in-chief
- General of the Air Force (USAF only)
- General of the Armies of the United States (of America), a title created for General John J. Pershing, and subsequently granted posthumously to George Washington and Ulysses S. Grant
- Generaladmiral ("general admiral") (German Navy)
- Air general and aviation general
- Wing general and group general
- General-potpukovnik (transl. Lieutenant colonel general, a Serb/Slovenian/Macedonian rank immediately inferior to colonel general, and roughly equivalent to Commonwealth/US major general)
- Director general (a common administrative term sometimes used as an appointment in military services)
- Director general of national defence (most senior rank in the Mexican Armed Forces)
- Controller general (general officer rank in the French National Police)
- Prefect general (the most senior rank of the Argentine Naval Prefecture)
- Master-General of the Ordnance (very senior British military position)
- Police General (most senior rank in some national police)
- Commissioner (highest rank of the Philippine Bureau of Immigration)

In addition to militarily educated generals, there are also generals in medicine and engineering. The rank of the most senior chaplain, (chaplain general), is also usually considered to be a general officer rank.

== Specific rank of general ==
In the old European system, a general, without prefix or suffix (and sometimes referred to informally as a "full general"), is usually the most senior type of general, above lieutenant general and directly below field marshal as a four-star rank (NATO OF-9).

Usually it is the most senior peacetime rank, with more senior ranks (for example, field marshal, marshal of the air force, fleet admiral) being used only in wartime or as honorary titles.

In some armies, however, the rank of captain general, army general or colonel general occupied or occupies this position. Depending on circumstances and the army in question, these ranks may be considered to be equivalent to a "full" general or to a field marshal five-star rank (NATO OF-10).

The rank of general came about as a "captain-general", the captain of an army in general (i.e., the whole army). The rank of captain-general began appearing around the time of the organisation of professional armies in the 17th century. In most countries "captain-general" contracted to just "general".

=== By country ===
The following articles deal with the rank of general, or its equivalent, as it is or was employed in the militaries of those countries:

- General (Australia)
- General (Bangladesh)
- General (Canada)
- Shangjiang (China) – People's Republic of China (PRC) and Republic of China (ROC/Taiwan)
- General (Denmark), General
- General (Estonia), Kindral
- General (Finland), Kenraali
- General (Germany), General
- Strategos (Greece)
- General (India)
- Daejang (North and South Korea)
- General (Mexico)
- General (Nigeria)
- General (Pakistan)
- General (Poland), Generał
- General (Sri Lanka)
- General (Sweden), General
- General (Switzerland)
- General (United Kingdom)
- General (United States)
- General (Yugoslav People's Army)

=== Insignia ===
==== Army ====
Général
(Arabic: عميد, romanized: Amid)
(Algerian People's National Army)

General
(Angolan Army)

General
(Australian Army)

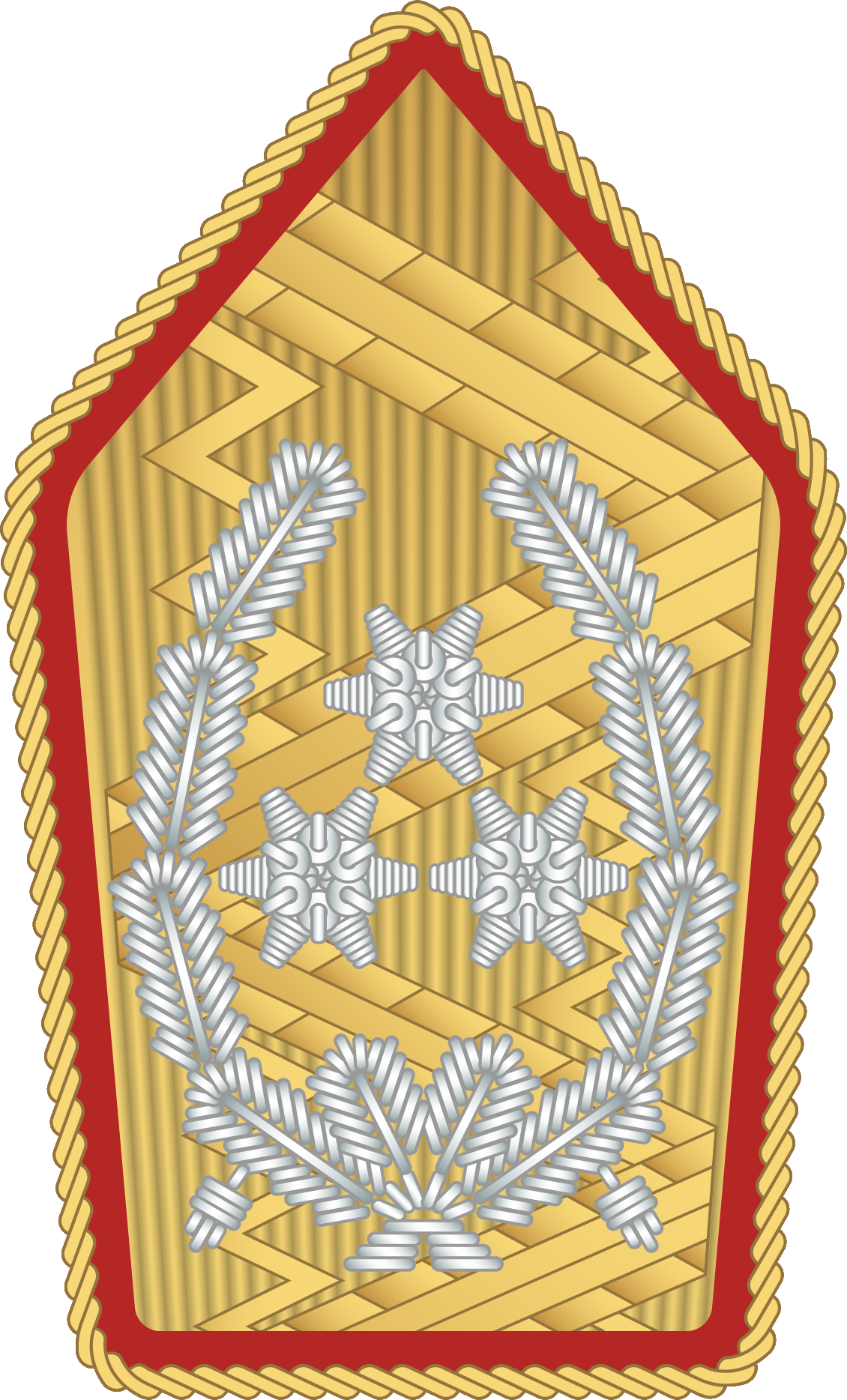
General
(Austrian Army)

জেনারেল
Jēnārēl
(Bangladesh Army)

Generaal
(Belgian Land Component)

Jeneral
(Royal Brunei Land Force)

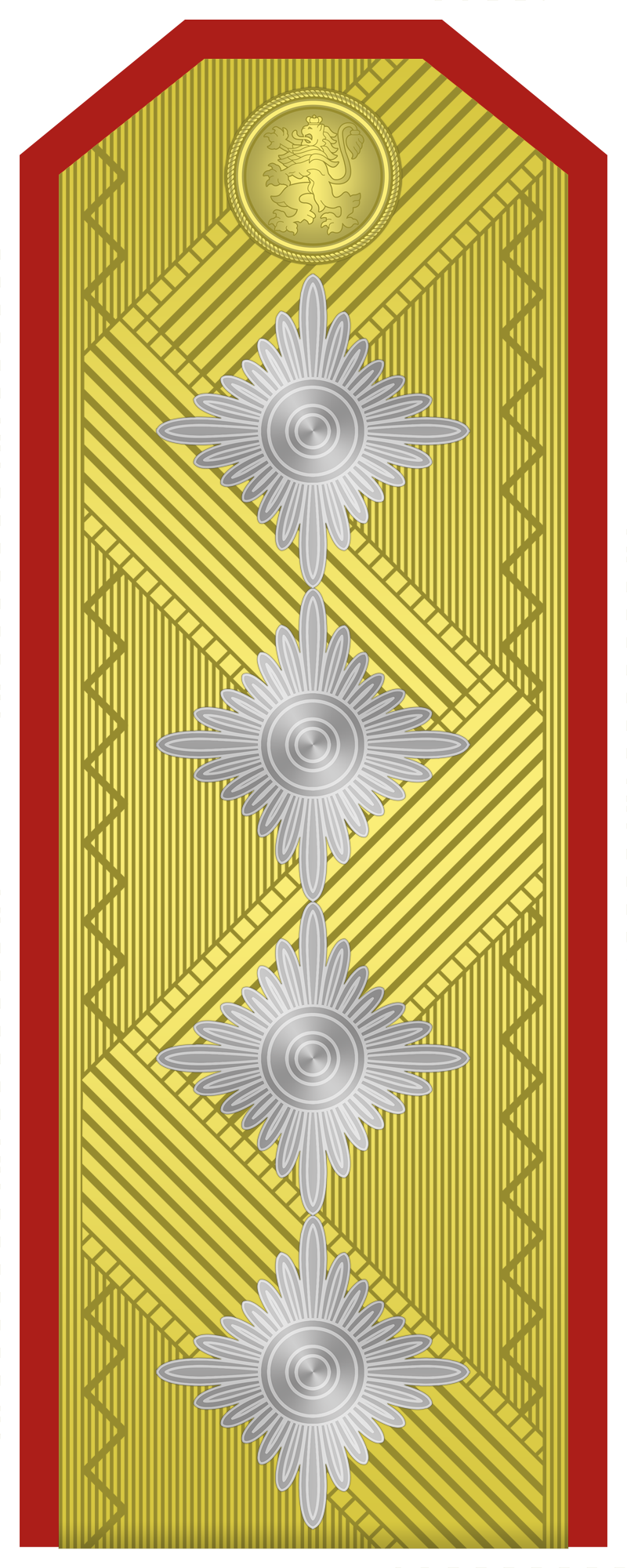
Генерал
General
(Bulgarian Army)

General
(Canadian Army)

General
(Royal Danish Army)

General
(Timor-Leste Army)

Kindral
(Estonian Land Forces)

ጄነራል
Jēnerali
(Ethiopian Ground Forces)

Kenraali
(Finnish Army)

General
(Gambian National Army)

General
(German Army)

General
(Ghana Army)

General
(Army of Guinea-Bissau)

जनरल
General
(Indian Army)

Jenderal
(Indonesian Army)

Generale
(Italian Army)

General
(Kenya Army)

Generolas
(Lithuanian Land Force)

Général
(Luxembourg Army)

Генерал
General
(Army of North Macedonia)

General
(Malawian Army)

Jeneral
(Malaysian Army)

Генерал
Gyenyeral
(Mongolian Ground Force)

General
(Namibian Army)

Generaal
(Royal Netherlands Army)

General
(Nigerian Army)

General
(Norwegian Army)

جنرل
General
(Pakistan Army)

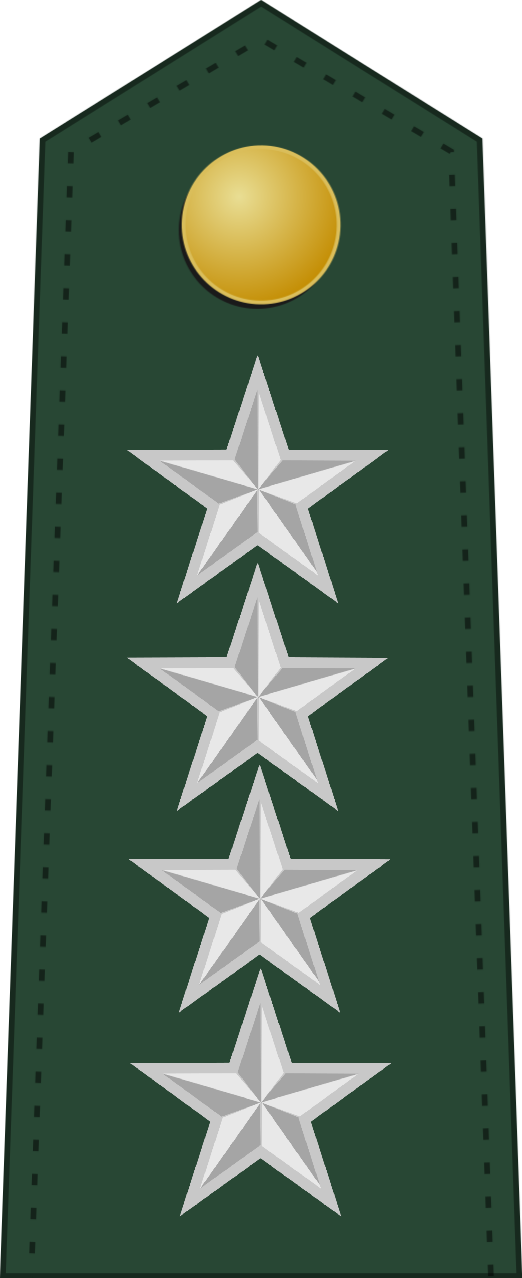
Heneral
(Philippine Army)

Generał
(Polish Army)

General
(Portuguese Army)

General
(Romanian Land Forces)

General
(Rwandan Defence Force)

Генерал
General
(Serbian Army)

Generál
(Ground Forces of the Slovak Republic)

General
(Slovenian Ground Force)

General
(South African Army)

General
(Sri Lanka Army)

General
(Swedish Army)

General
(Swiss Land Forces)

Jenerali
(Tanzanian Army)

General
(Ugandan Land Forces)

Генерал
Heneral
(Ukrainian Ground Forces)

General
(British Army)

General
(U.S. Army)

General
(Zambian Army)

General
(Zimbabwe National Army)

==== Air force ====
General
(National Air Force of Angola)

Generaal
(Belgian Air Force)

Jeneral (Udara)
(Royal Brunei Air Force)

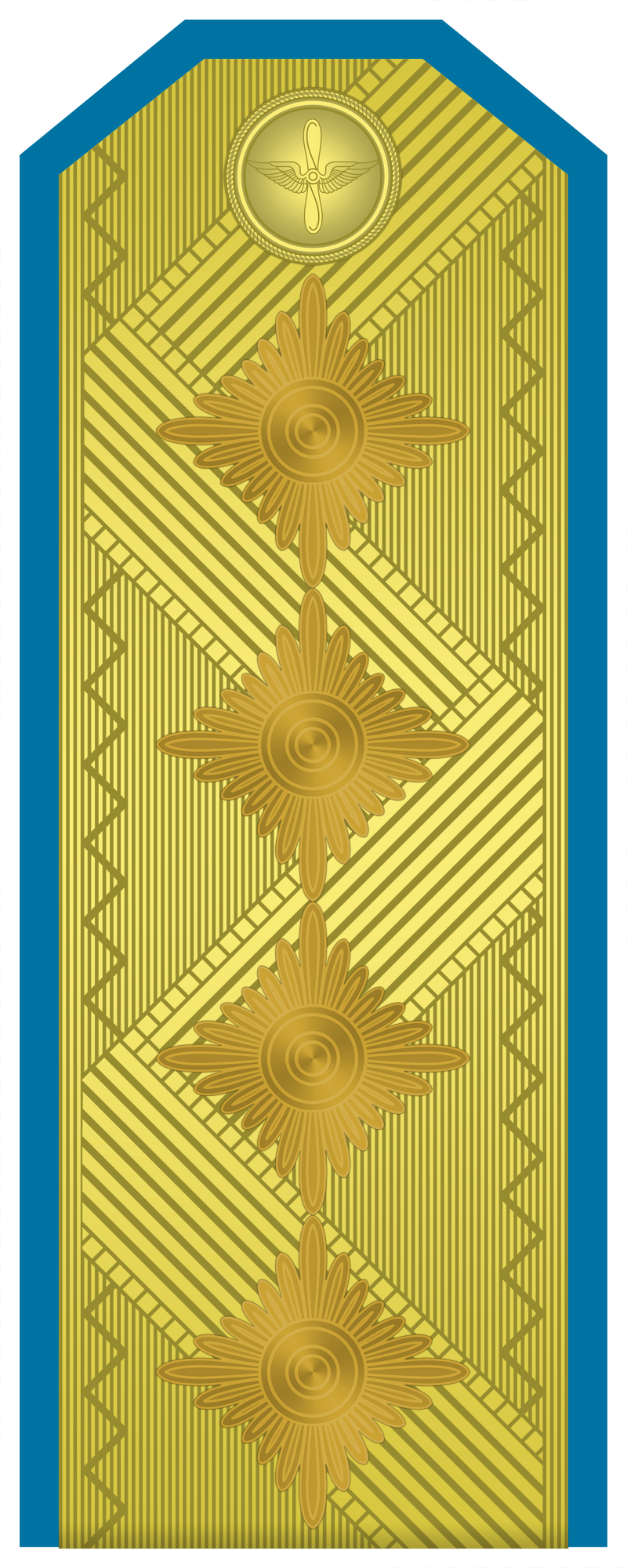
Генерал
General
(Bulgarian Air Force)

General
(Royal Canadian Air Force)

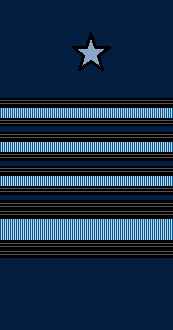
General de aire
(Chilean Air Force)

General de aire
(Colombian Air Force)

General
(Royal Danish Air Force)

General del aire
(Ecuadorian Air Force)

Kindral
(Estonian Air Force)

Kenraali
(Finnish Air Force)

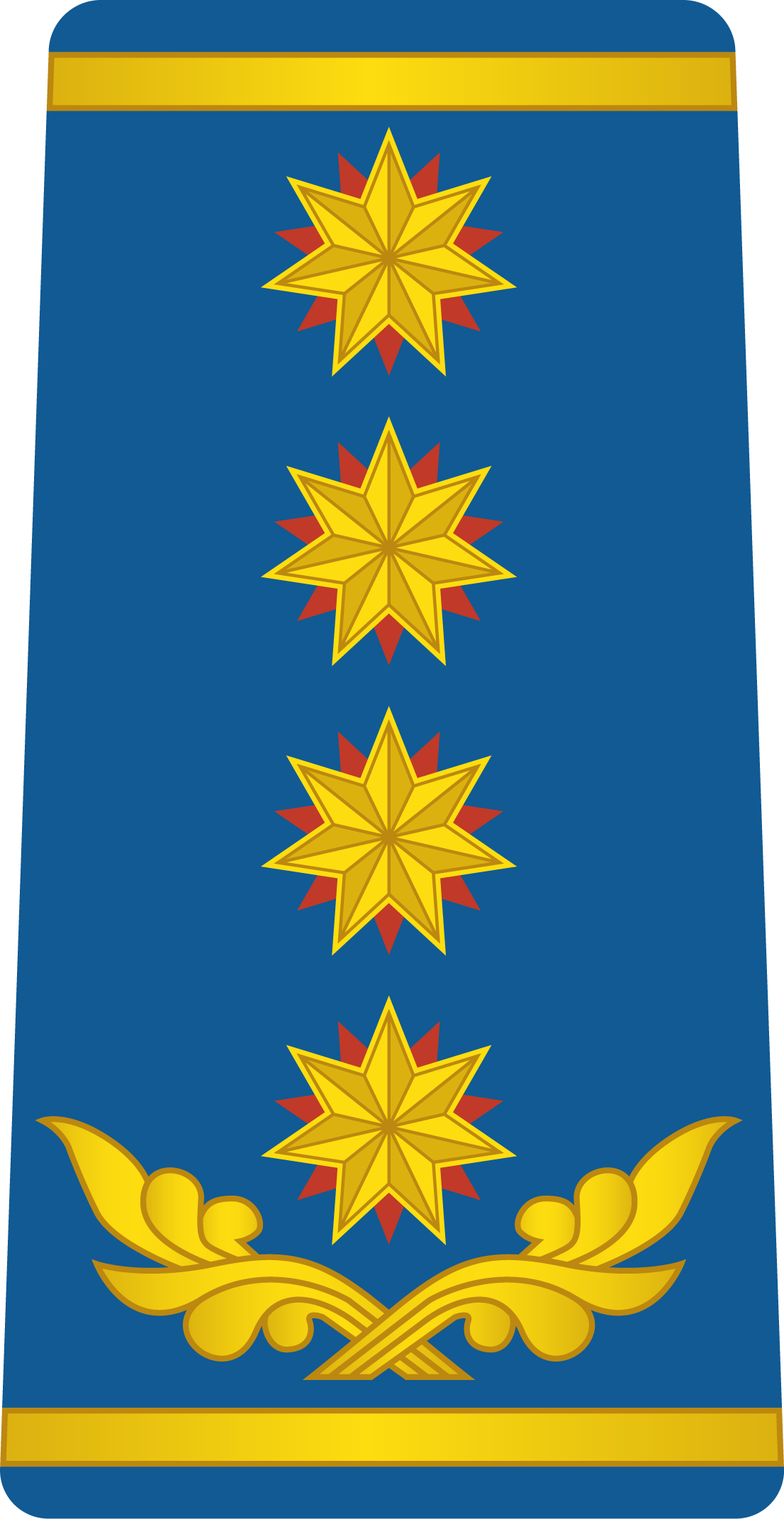
გენერალი
Generali
(Georgian Air Force)

General
(German Air Force)

General
(Kenya Air Force)

Jeneral
(Royal Malaysian Air Force)

Генерал
General
(Mongolian Air Force)

Generaal
(Royal Netherlands Air Force)

General
(Royal Norwegian Air Force)

General del aire
(Peruvian Air Force)

Heneral
(Philippine Air Force)

Generał
(Polish Air Force)

General
(Portuguese Air Force)

General
(Romanian Air Force)

General
(Rwandan Air Force)

Генерал
General
(Serbian Air Force and Air Defence)

Generál
(Slovak Air Force)

General
(South African Air Force)

General del aire
(Spanish Air and Space Force)

General
(Swedish Air Force)

General
(Tanzania Air Force Command)

Orgeneral
(Turkish Air Force)

General
(Ugandan Air Force)

Генерал
Heneral
(Ukrainian Air Force)

General
(US Air Force)

General del aire
(Uruguayan Air Force)

==== Navy ====
General
(Colombian Naval Infantry)

Jenderal (Marinir)
(Indonesian Marine Corps)

ޖެނެރަލް
General
(Maldivian Marine Corps)

Generaal
(Netherlands Marine Corps)

General
(Swedish Amphibious Corps)

General
(Royal Marines)

General
(US Marine Corps)

== Air force and naval equivalents ==
Some countries (such as the United States) use the general officer ranks for both the army and the air force, as well as their marine corps; other states only use the general officer ranks for the army, while in the air force they use air officers as the equivalent of general officers. They use the air force rank of air chief marshal as the equivalent of the specific army rank of general. This latter group includes the British Royal Air Force and many current and former Commonwealth air forces—e.g. Royal Australian Air Force, Indian Air Force, Royal New Zealand Air Force, Nigerian Air Force, Pakistan Air Force, etc.

In most navies, flag officers are the equivalent of general officers, and the naval rank of admiral is equivalent to the specific army rank of general. A noteworthy historical exception was the Cromwellian naval rank "general at sea". In recent years in the American service there is a tendency to use flag officer and flag rank to refer to generals and admirals of the services collectively.

== See also ==
- General officers in the United States
- List of comparative military ranks
- List of Roman generals
- General officer commanding
- Général
- Generalissimo
- Shogun
