= D41 road (Croatia) =

Road in Croatia

D41 state road

Route information
- Length: 57.9 km (36.0 mi)

Major junctions
- From: Gola border crossing to Hungary
- D210 in Gola; D2 in Koprivnica
- To: D22 in Križevci

Location
- Country: Croatia
- Counties: Koprivnica-Križevci
- Major cities: Koprivnica, Križevci

Highway system
- Highways in Croatia

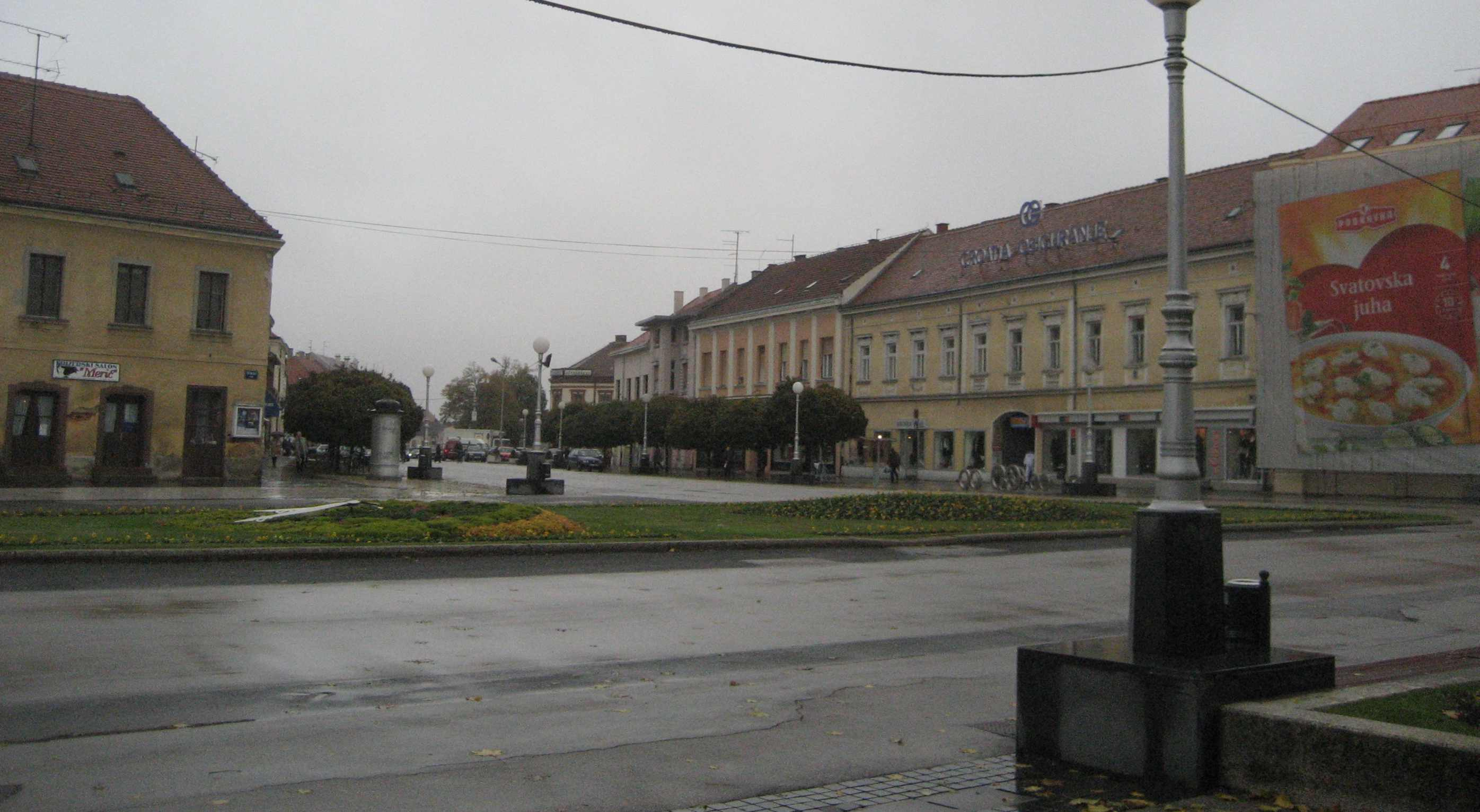
Koprivnica, on the D41 road route

D41 is a state road in the central Croatia connecting Križevci to Koprivnica and Gola border crossing to Hungary. The road is 57.9 km (36.0 mi) long.

This and all other state roads in Croatia are managed and maintained by Hrvatske ceste, a state-owned company.

== Traffic volume ==
Traffic is regularly counted and reported by Hrvatske ceste, one of the operators of the road.

D41 traffic volume
Road	Counting site	AADT	ASDT	Notes
D41	1401 Gola	929	1,066	Between the Ž2116 and Ž2115 junctions.
D41	1310 Peteranec	2,291	2,496	Between the Ž2114 and Ž2113 junctions.
D41	1311 Sokolovac	3,836	3,809	Adjacent to the L26006 junction.

== Road junctions and populated areas ==
D41 junctions/populated areas
Type	Slip roads/Notes
	Gola border crossing The route extends to Berzence, Hungary. The northern terminus of the road.
	Gola; D210 to Ždala, Molve and Virje (D2). Ž2116 to Novačka and Repaš (D210).
	Ž2115 to Otočka.
	Gotalovo
	Drava Bridge
	Ž2091 to Šoderica.
	Botovo
	Drnje; Ž2260 to Torčec and Đelekovec (D20). Ž2114 to Hlebine and Molve (D210).
	Peteranec; Ž2113 to Ž2114 county road.
	Koprivnica; D2 to the A4 motorway Ludbreg interchange and Varaždin (D3) to the west and to Virovitica (D5) to the east.
	Reka
	Velika Mučna
	Sokolovac; Ž2181 to Srijem and Široko Selo.
	Ž2139 to Veliki Botinovac and Mali Grabičani.
	Carevdar
	Ž2238 to Kloštar Vojakovački.
	Ž2180 to Vojakovec, Čabraji and Ivanec Križevački.
	Majurec; Ž2212 to Sveti Petar Čvrstec and Zrinski Topolovac.
	Križevci; D22 to Novi Marof (D3) (to the north) and Sveti Ivan Žabno (D28) and D10 expressway (to the south). The southern terminus of the road.
