= D210 road =

Road in Croatia

D210 state road

Route information
- Length: 24.3 km (15.1 mi)

Major junctions
- From: D2 in Virje
- To: D41 in Gola

Location
- Country: Croatia
- Counties: Koprivnica-Križevci
- Major cities: Virje

Highway system
- Highways in Croatia

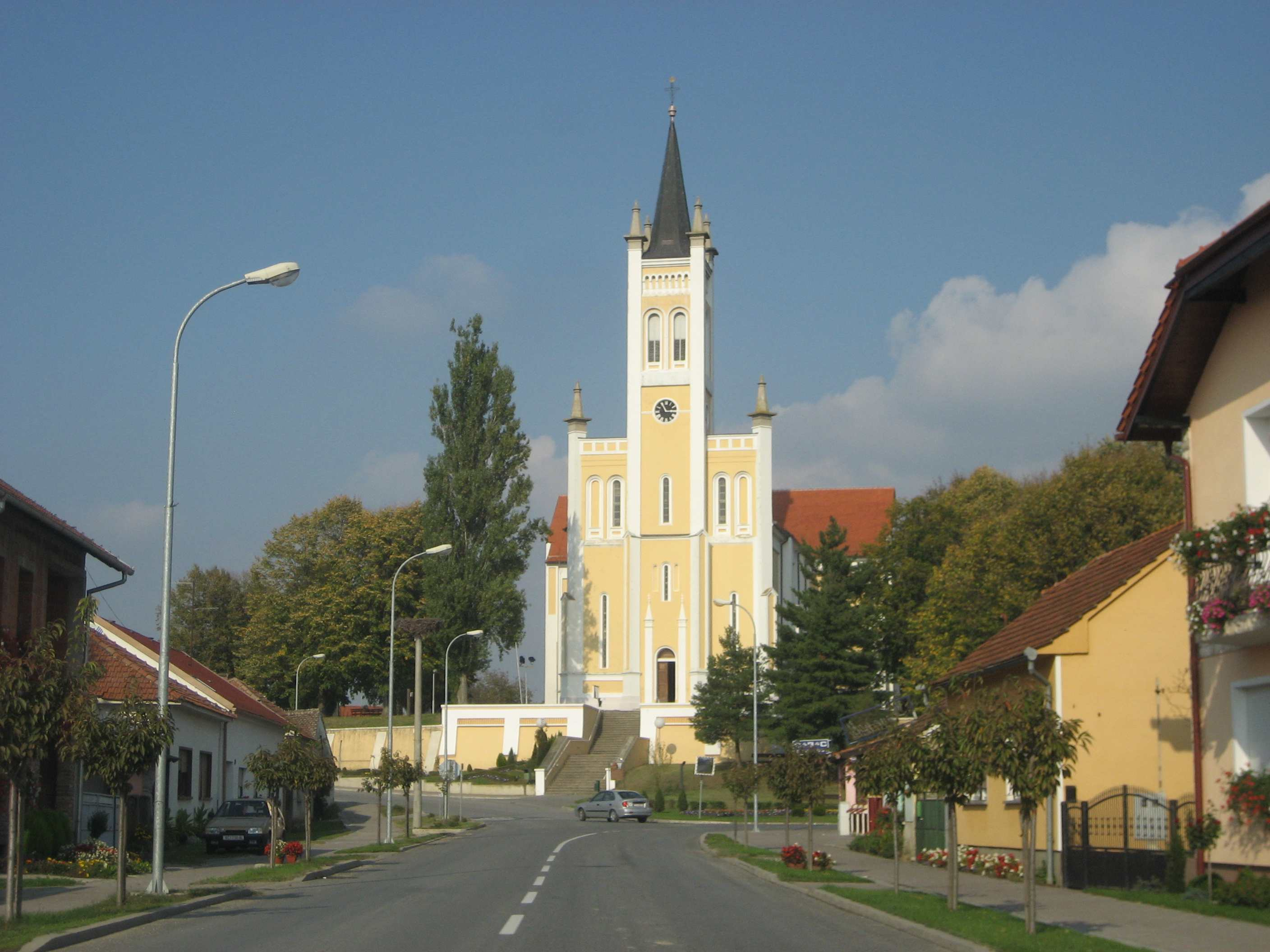
Molve, on the D210 road route

D210 is a state road in Podravina region of Croatia connecting Gola and the nearby Gola border crossing to Slovenia to the town of Virje on the D2 state road. The road is 24.3 km (15.1 mi) long.

The road, as well as all other state roads in Croatia, is managed and maintained by Hrvatske ceste, state owned company.

== Traffic volume ==
Traffic is regularly counted and reported by Hrvatske ceste, operator of the road.

D210 traffic volume
Road	Counting site	AADT	ASDT	Notes
D210	1402 Virje	758	989	Adjacent to the Ž2114 junction.

== Road junctions and populated areas ==
D210 junctions/populated areas
Type	Slip roads/Notes
	Gola; D41 to Gola border crossing (to the east) and to Drnje (D20) Koprivnica (D2) (to the west). The northern terminus of the road.
	Ždala
	Repaš; Ž2116 to Novačka and Gola (D41).
	Drava Bridge - 372 m (1,220 ft) long.
	Molve; Ž2114 to Hlebine and Drnje (D41). Ž2184 to Molve Grede and Grkine.
	Virje; D2 to Koprivnica (D41) (to the west) and Đurđevac (D43) (to the east). The southern terminus of the road.
