= 27th Infantry Division Savska =

Royal Yugoslav Army formation

- Active: 1935 – 10 April 1941
- Country: Kingdom of Yugoslavia
- Branch: Royal Yugoslav Army
- Type: Infantry Division
- Size: 26,000–27,000 officers and soldiers (planned); 2,000 men (by April 10th, 1941)
- Part of: 4th Army
- Patron: Sava river
- Engagements: World War II: Invasion of Yugoslavia

Commanders
- Notable commanders: August Marić

The 27th Infantry Division Savska was an infantry formation of the Royal Yugoslav Army that formed part of the 4th Army during the German-led invasion of Yugoslavia by the Axis powers in April 1941. It was raised from the Savska divisional district, and like all Yugoslav infantry divisions of the time, was a very large and unwieldy formation almost entirely reliant on animal transport for mobility. Commanded by Divizijski đeneral August Marić, the division was largely made up of ethnic Croat troops, many of whom saw the Germans as potential liberators from Serbian oppression during the interwar period. It also lacked modern arms and sufficient ammunition.

Along with the rest of the Yugoslav Army, the 27th Infantry Division Savska began mobilising on 3 April 1941, and was still engaged in that process three days later when the Germans began an air campaign and a series of preliminary operations along the Yugoslav frontiers. These attacks ignited rebellion within the Croat troops of the division. The chief of staff of the division became involved, countermanding orders for the sabotage of a key bridge over the Drava river at Zákány. The division briefly established a defensive line on the Yugoslav side of the river, but German troops began crossing on 7 April, forcing the division to begin withdrawing. A counterattack delayed the German advance during the night of 8/9 April, but the division began to disintegrate due to fifth column actions, rebellion and desertion. When the German 14th Panzer Division broke out of the bridgehead at Zákány on 10 April, the 27th Infantry Division Savska numbered only 2,000 men, mostly Serbs. In a single day, the German panzers, with overwhelming air support, brushed aside the remnants of the division and captured Zagreb, covering nearly 160 kilometres (100 mi) and meeting little resistance. On that day the divisional headquarters was captured, and the division effectively ceased to exist.

== Background ==
A map showing the location of Yugoslavia in 1930s Europe

The Kingdom of Serbs, Croats and Slovenes, was created with the merger of Serbia, Montenegro and the South Slav-inhabited areas of Austria-Hungary on 1 December 1918, in the immediate aftermath of World War I. The Army of the Kingdom of Serbs, Croats and Slovenes was established to defend the new state. It was formed around the nucleus of the victorious Royal Serbian Army, as well as armed formations raised in regions formerly controlled by Austria-Hungary. Many former Austro-Hungarian officers and soldiers became members of the new army. From the beginning, much like other aspects of public life in the new kingdom, the army was dominated by ethnic Serbs, who saw it as a means by which to secure Serb political hegemony.

The army's development was hampered by the kingdom's poor economy, and this continued during the 1920s. In 1929, King Alexander changed the name of the country to the Kingdom of Yugoslavia, at which time the army was renamed the Royal Yugoslav Army (Serbo-Croatian Latin: Vojska Kraljevine Jugoslavije, VKJ). The army budget remained tight, and as tensions rose across Europe during the 1930s, it became difficult to secure weapons and munitions from other countries. Consequently, at the time World War II broke out in September 1939, the VKJ had several serious weaknesses, which included reliance on draught animals for transport, and the large size of its formations. Infantry divisions had a wartime strength of 26,000–27,000 men, as compared to contemporary British infantry divisions of half that strength. These characteristics resulted in slow, unwieldy formations, and the inadequate supply of arms and munitions meant that even the very large Yugoslav formations had low firepower. Generals better suited to the trench warfare of World War I were combined with an army that was neither equipped nor trained to resist the fast-moving combined arms approach used by the Germans in their invasions of Poland and France.

The weaknesses of the VKJ in strategy, structure, equipment, mobility and supply were exacerbated by serious ethnic disunity within Yugoslavia, resulting from two decades of Serb hegemony and the attendant lack of political legitimacy achieved by the central government. Attempts to address the disunity came too late to ensure that the VKJ was a cohesive force. Fifth column activity was also a serious concern, not only from the Croatian nationalist Ustaše but also from the country's Slovene and ethnic German minorities.

== Structure ==
=== Peacetime organisation ===
According to regulations issued by the VKJ in 1935, the 27th Infantry Division Savska was to be raised from the Savska divisional district, which was headquartered in Zagreb. The Savska divisional district was under the control of the 4th Army district, also headquartered in Zagreb. The division was named for the Sava river, a tributary of the Danube that flows along the northern border of modern-day Bosnia and Herzegovina. In peacetime, the Savska divisional district included:

- 35th Infantry Regiment, based in Zagreb
- 36th Infantry Regiment, based in Varaždin
- 53rd Infantry Regiment, based in Karlovac
- 14th Artillery Regiment, based in Varaždin
- 30th Artillery Regiment, based in Zagreb

=== Wartime organisation ===
The wartime organisation of the VKJ was laid down by regulations issued in 1936–1937, which set the strength of an infantry division at 26,000–27,000 men. A total of 11,200 horses and other pack and draught animals were required to provide mobility for each infantry division. The theoretical wartime organisation of a fully mobilised Yugoslav infantry division was:

- headquarters
- divisional infantry headquarters, with three or four infantry regiments
- divisional artillery headquarters, with one or two artillery regiments
- a cavalry battalion with two horsed cavalry squadrons, a bicycle squadron and a machine gun platoon
- a pioneer battalion of three companies
- an anti-tank company, equipped with twelve 37 mm (1.5 in) or 47 mm (1.9 in) anti-tank guns
- a machine gun company
- an anti-aircraft machine gun company
- a signals company
- logistics units

Each infantry regiment was to consist of three or four infantry battalions and a machine gun company. The divisional artillery regiments were animal-drawn and largely equipped with World War I vintage pieces. An artillery regiment consisted of four battalions, one of 100 mm (3.9 in) light howitzers, one of 65 mm (2.6 in) or 75 mm (3 in) mountain guns, and two of 75 mm or 80 mm (3.1 in) field guns. The 36th Infantry Regiment and the 14th and 30th Artillery Regiments, which were administered by the Savska divisional district in peacetime, were earmarked to join other formations when they were mobilised, and the division was to be brought up to its wartime strength by the 104th Infantry Regiment and the 27th Artillery Regiment from the VKJ reserve.

== Planned deployment ==
Planned deployment locations for 27th ID and flanking formations

The 27th Infantry Division Savska (27th ID) was a component of the 4th Army as part of the 1st Army Group, which was responsible for the defence of north and northwestern Yugoslavia. In the event of mobilisation, the 4th Army was to deploy in a cordon along the western sector of the Hungarian border, with the 27th ID positioned opposite the Hungarian village of Gyékényes, between the confluence of the Mura at Legrad and Kloštar Podravski. In this disposition, the divisional headquarters was planned to be located at Kapela, north of Bjelovar. On the left flank of the division it was planned that the 42nd Infantry Division Murska (42nd ID) would be positioned opposite the Hungarian city of Nagykanizsa, and on the right flank the 40th Infantry Division Slavonska (40th ID) was to establish itself opposite the Hungarian town of Barcs. Border guard units in the division's area of responsibility would consist of the 3rd Battalion of the 393rd Reserve Regiment and the 576th Independent Battalion.

== Operations ==
=== Mobilisation ===
After unrelenting pressure from Adolf Hitler, Yugoslavia signed the Tripartite Pact on 25 March 1941. On 27 March, a military coup d'état overthrew the government that had signed the pact, and a new government was formed under the Royal Yugoslav Army Air Force commander, Armijski đeneral (Note: Equivalent to a U.S. Army lieutenant general.) Dušan Simović. A general mobilisation was not called by the new government until 3 April 1941, out of fear of offending Hitler and thus precipitating war. The day of the coup, Hitler issued Führer Directive 25, which called for Yugoslavia to be treated as a hostile state; on 3 April, Führer Directive 26 was issued, detailing the plan of attack and command structure for the invasion, which was to commence on 6 April.

As the Axis invasion began, the 27th ID had only commenced mobilisation, and was largely in its mobilisation centres or moving to its concentration areas. On 4 April, the commander of the 4th Army, Armijski đeneral Petar Nedeljković, had reported that the division could not move for another 24 hours due to lack of vehicles. Only a small proportion of the division was in its planned positions on 6 April:

- the divisional commander Divizijski đeneral (Note: Equivalent to a U.S. Army major general.) August Marić and his headquarters staff were mobilising in Zagreb
- the 35th Infantry Regiment (less its 3rd Battalion) was marching from Zagreb to Križevci, with its 3rd Battalion still in Zagreb
- the 53rd Infantry Regiment, with about 50 percent of its troops and 15 percent of its animals, was moving by rail from its mobilisation centre in Karlovac via Križevci to Koprivnica, with its 1st Battalion detraining in Koprivnica
- the 104th Infantry Regiment was marching from its mobilisation centre in Sesvete via Dugo Selo to Bjelovar
- Two battalions of the 27th Artillery Regiment were in position in Novigrad Podravski near Koprivnica, with the rest of the 27th Artillery Regiment still mobilising in Zagreb and Varaždin
- the divisional cavalry battalion was mobilising in Čakovec but had no horses, and the divisional machine gun battalion was mobilising in Zagreb but also had no animal transport
- the remainder of the divisional units were at their mobilisation centres in and around Zagreb

=== 6 April ===
Early on 6 April 1941, the German XXXXVI Motorised Corps of General der Panzertruppe Heinrich von Vietinghoff launched preliminary attacks along the Drava between Ždala and Gotalovo in the 27th ID sector with the intention of securing crossings over the river, but they were unsuccessful. By the evening, German successes elsewhere along the Hungarian border made it clear to the Germans that the Yugoslavs would not be resisting stubbornly at the frontier. The XXXXVI Motorised Corps was then ordered to begin seizing bridges over the Drava along the length of the 4th Army front, including at Zákány near Gyékényes. These local attacks were sufficient to inflame dissent within the largely Croat 4th Army, who refused to resist the Germans who they considered their liberators from Serbian oppression during the interwar period.

The continuing mobilisation and concentration of the division and of the whole of the 4th Army was hampered by escalating fifth column activities and propaganda fomented by the Croatian nationalist Ustaše. Some units stopped mobilising, or began returning to their mobilisation centres from their concentration areas. During the day, Yugoslav sabotage units attempted to destroy the bridge over the Drava at Zákány. This attempt was only partially successful, due to the influence of Ustaše propaganda and the countermanding of the demolition orders by the chief of staff of the 27th ID, Major Anton Marković. The Yugoslav radio network linking the division with the 4th Army and flanking divisions was sabotaged by the Ustaše on 6 April, and radio communications within the 4th Army remained poor throughout the fighting.

=== 7 April ===
About 05:00 on 7 April, two to three battalions of the XXXXVI Motorised Corps commenced crossing the Drava at Zákány, and attacked towards Koprivnica. In response to the German crossing, the 53rd Infantry Regiment withdrew towards Koprivnica and took up defensive positions in a series of villages including Torčec. To stop this German penetration and gain more time for the concentration of the division, elements of the 27th Artillery Regiment were sent to support the defensive line near Torčec, which was placed under the command of the division's commanding officer for infantry. About 07:30, the commander of the Yugoslav 1st Army Group, Armijski đeneral Milorad Petrović, met with Nedeljković at Zagreb and ordered him to go to Koprivnica and prepare a counterattack against the bridgehead, to commence at 15:00. The counterattack plan was unable to be carried out, as the necessary units could not reach their positions.

About 10:30, the Germans reached the defensive line near Torčec, and fighting began. A few Breguet 19s of the 4th Air Reconnaissance Group, attached to the 1st Army Group, which had survived an early morning raid on their airfield the previous day, mounted attacks on the bridge over the Drava at Zákány. After the Germans reinforced their bridgehead with two more battalions, they overcame the Yugoslav defenders, who had suffered significant losses and were running low on artillery ammunition. About 18:00, the 53rd Infantry Regiment withdrew to Koprivnica along with its artillery support, and remained in the town during the night. The bridge at Zákány was destroyed later that day by sabotage units. At 23:00, following orders from Petrović that he was to attack on 8 April at all costs, Nedeljković issued orders for a counterattack to be carried out early on 8 April.

=== 8 April ===
On 8 April, the German XXXXVI Motorised Corps continued with its limited objective attacks to expand their bridgeheads on the 4th Army front, including at Zákány. The resistance offered by both flanking divisions was very limited. The 36th Infantry Regiment of the 42nd ID, which had been concentrating in the Ludbreg district northwest of Koprivnica, was transferred to the 27th ID, in an attempt to bolster the left flank of the divisional sector.

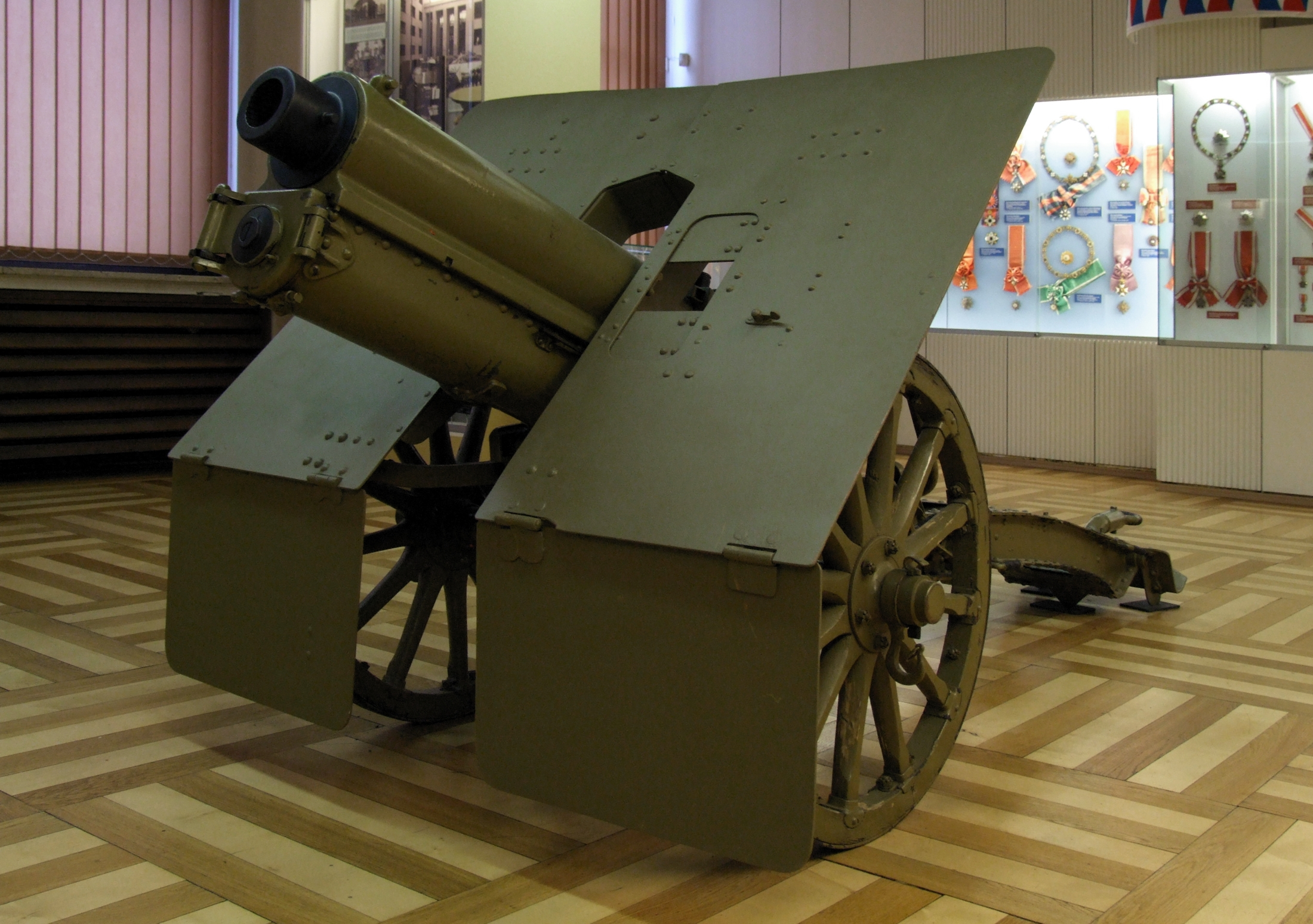
Two batteries of Skoda 75 mm Model 1928 mountain guns were deployed in support of the counterattack by 27th ID on the Zákány bridgehead.

In the morning of 8 April, the 27th ID was deployed around Koprivnica. The 104th Infantry Regiment supported by elements of the 27th Artillery Regiment was deployed northeast of the town behind the Drava between Molve and Hlebine. The 2nd Cavalry Regiment of the 1st Cavalry Division, which had been riding from its mobilisation centre in Virovitica to Zagreb, was allocated to the 27th ID to assist with establishing its forward defences, and was deployed with two artillery batteries between the outskirts of Koprivnica and Bregi. The 53rd Infantry Regiment, and the remnants of the 2nd Battalion of the 36th Infantry Regiment and the 1st Battalion of the 35th Infantry Regiment (totalling around 500 men), and the 1st Battery of the 27th Artillery Regiment were located in the town itself. The 2nd Battalion of the 36th Infantry Regiment had not yet arrived in Koprivnica, and the divisional cavalry battalion had reached as far as Ivanec. The majority of the 81st Cavalry Regiment, detached from the 4th Army, was on the road from Zagreb to Koprivnica, although its 1st Squadron, which had been transported to Koprivnica in cars on 7 April, was deployed as part of an outpost line forward of Koprivnica supporting the 1st Battalion of the 53rd Infantry Regiment. The divisional headquarters was located 5 kilometres (3 mi) southwest of Koprivnica at Reka.

In accordance with Nedeljković's orders, Marić's 27th ID was to undertake a counterattack against the Zákány bridgehead on 8 April. Supported by two batteries of Skoda 75 mm Model 1928 mountain guns of the 27th Artillery Regiment, the attack consisted of three columns converging on the bridgehead. The right column, attacking from the area of Bregi, was to consist of the 2nd Cavalry Regiment supported by the divisional machine gun company. The centre column, consisting of the 53rd Infantry Regiment and the remnants of the 2nd Battalion of the 36th Infantry Regiment and the 1st Battalion of the 35th Infantry Regiment, directly supported by the 1st Battery of the 27th Artillery Regiment, would attack from Koprivnica. The left column, attacking from the vicinity of Herešin, was to consist of the dismounted 81st Cavalry Regiment. As promised support from the 36th Infantry Regiment, 81st Cavalry Regiment and army-level artillery had not materialised, Marić postponed the counterattack to 16:00. By noon, a full-scale revolt had broken out within the flanking 40th ID, resulting in the capture of the town of Bjelovar and a large portion of the 4th Army headquarters by the rebels that afternoon. The attack on the bridgehead at Zákány was eventually launched, but by the time the attack petered out only the 2nd Cavalry Regiment and the 1st Squadron of the 81st Cavalry Regiment remained in contact with the Germans south of Peteranec. The 2nd Cavalry Regiment held that area throughout the night of 8/9 April, despite heavy German artillery fire. Of the other units involved in the counterattack, most were only at 25 percent of their full strength due to Ustaše-influenced desertions sparked by the rebellion within the 40th ID. Two battalions of the 36th Infantry Regiment deserted during the day.

=== 9 April ===
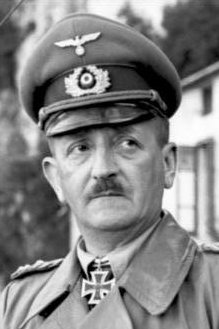
General der Panzertruppe Heinrich von Vietinghoff commanded the XXXXVI Motorised Corps.

On 9 April, the left flanking 42nd ID withdrew from the Drava to conform with the line being held by forward elements of the 27th ID, while the German XXXXVI Motorised Corps completed its preparations for full-scale offensive action by expanding its bridgehead at Zákány. The cavalry units continued to fight the Germans around Peteranec, but the left sector of the divisional front line began to disintegrate. The commander of the right sector, Pukovnik (Note: Equivalent to a U.S. Army colonel.) Mihailo Georgijević ordered his troops to hold their positions and went to divisional headquarters to ask approval to discharge the Croats in his units. Marić would not inform 4th Army headquarters of this idea, so Georgijević went to Zagreb to speak to Petrović, and to further urge him to withdraw all troops that still wanted to fight to a line south of the Sava. According to Georgijević, Petrović ordered him to tell Marić to consider disarming his Croat troops, and to continue to hold positions on the line of the Bilogora hills, but to conduct a fighting withdrawal towards Zagreb and Sisak if the German pressure was too great. The intent of these orders was not implemented, as fifth column elements changed the wording so that orders were issued to discharge Croat troops and to retreat towards Zagreb without fighting.

About 09:00, Marić and Marković went to Zagreb to see Petrović, who ordered them to immediately return to their division and continue to resist the Germans. On the return journey, they encountered most of their division withdrawing towards Križevci, with the exception of the cavalry units still fighting north of Koprivnica. Marić halted the retreat, and established positions around Mali Grabičani, making his headquarters at Križevci. Georgijević dismissed his Croat troops and retreated with the rest of his force towards Zagreb, and the commander of the 104th Infantry Regiment discharged all his troops. In the afternoon, the hard-pressed cavalry units began to withdraw. About 14:00, the 2nd Cavalry Regiment withdrew to Novigrad Podravski via Bregi, but receiving a hostile reception from the Croat population, continued towards Bjelovar. About 18:00, the 1st Squadron of the 81st Cavalry Regiment withdrew via Koprivnica, reaching the rest of the division about 23:00. About 19:00, the Germans occupied Koprivnica without resistance. By evening, Marić's division numbered about 2,000 troops, the 36th Infantry Regiment and 81st Cavalry Regiment were widely dispersed, the 53rd Infantry Regiment had effectively ceased to exist, and his artillery regiment had only two horses to pull guns.

Before the disbandment of the 104th Infantry Regiment, the rebels in Bjelovar had used the telegraph station and telephone exchange in the town to issue false orders to parts of it directing them to withdraw from their positions. The rebels also contacted the Germans by telephone and sent representatives to meet the Germans at the Drava bridgeheads, to advise them that the roads had been cleared of obstacles, and the rebels invited them to enter Bjelovar. Rebels and deserters began to converge on Bjelovar, bringing with them many Serb officers and soldiers who soon filled the town's jails.

Elements of the 4th Army began to withdraw southwards on 9 April. On the evening of 9 April, Generaloberst (Note: Equivalent to a U.S. Army general.) Maximilian von Weichs, commander of the German 2nd Army, was ready to launch major offensive operations from the bridgeheads on the following day. His plan involved two main thrusts. The first would be spearheaded by the 14th Panzer Division of Generalmajor (Note: Equivalent to a U.S. Army brigadier general.) Friedrich Kühn, breaking out of the Zákány bridgehead and drive towards Zagreb. The second would see Generalmajor Walter Neumann-Silkow's 8th Panzer Division break out of the bridgehead in the sector of the 40th ID and turn east between the Drava and Sava to attack towards Belgrade. On the night of 9/10 April, those Croats that had remained with their units also began to desert or turn on their commanders, and in the 40th ID on the right flank of the 27th ID, almost all the remaining troops were Serbs. Due to the increasing momentum of the revolt, Petrović concluded that the 4th Army was no longer an effective formation and could not resist the Germans.

=== Fate ===
Early on 10 April, Pukovnik Franjo Nikolić, the head of the operations staff with the headquarters of the 1st Army Group, left his post and visited the senior Ustaše leader Slavko Kvaternik in Zagreb. He then returned to headquarters and redirected 4th Army units around Zagreb to either cease operations or to deploy to innocuous positions. These actions reduced or eliminated armed resistance to the German advance. On the same day, the 14th Panzer Division, supported by dive bombers, crossed the Drava and drove southwest towards Zagreb on snow-covered roads in extremely cold conditions. Initial air reconnaissance indicated large concentrations of Yugoslav troops on the divisional axis of advance, but these troops proved to be withdrawing towards Zagreb.

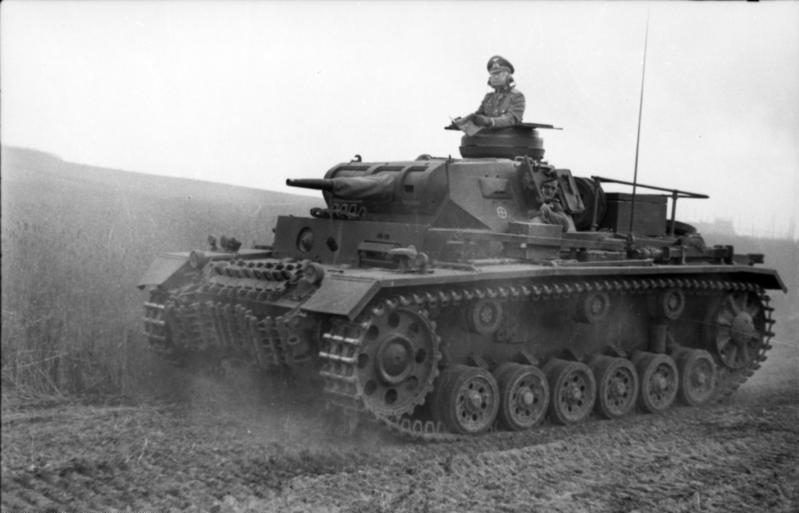
German tanks brushed aside Yugoslav resistance.

Degraded by revolt and fifth-column activity, the 27th ID numbered about 2,000 effectives when the German attack began. The 14th Panzer Division vanguard reached their positions in the Bilogora range around 08:00, and the remnants of the division began withdrawing towards Križevci under heavy air attack. When they reached the town around 14:00, they were quickly encircled by German motorised troops that had outflanked them. The divisional headquarters staff escaped, but were captured a little further down the road at Bojnikovec. The remnants of the 2nd Cavalry Regiment had to fight its way towards Bjelovar, but was attacked and captured by German tanks on the outskirts. The 14th Panzer Division continued its almost completely unopposed drive on Zagreb using two routes, Križevci – Dugo Selo – Zagreb and Bjelovar – Čazma – Ivanić-Grad – Zagreb.

About 17:45 on 10 April, Kvaternik and SS-Standartenführer (Note: Equivalent to a U.S. Army colonel.) Edmund Veesenmayer went to the radio station in Zagreb and Kvaternik proclaimed the creation of the Independent State of Croatia (Croatian: Nezavisna Država Hrvatska, NDH). The 35th Infantry Regiment of the 27th ID was disbanded by its commander when he heard news of the proclamation. By 19:30 on 10 April, lead elements of the 14th Panzer Division had reached the outskirts of Zagreb, having covered nearly 160 kilometres (100 miles) in a single day. By the time it entered Zagreb, the 14th Panzer Division was met by cheering crowds, and had captured 15,000 Yugoslav troops, including 22 generals.

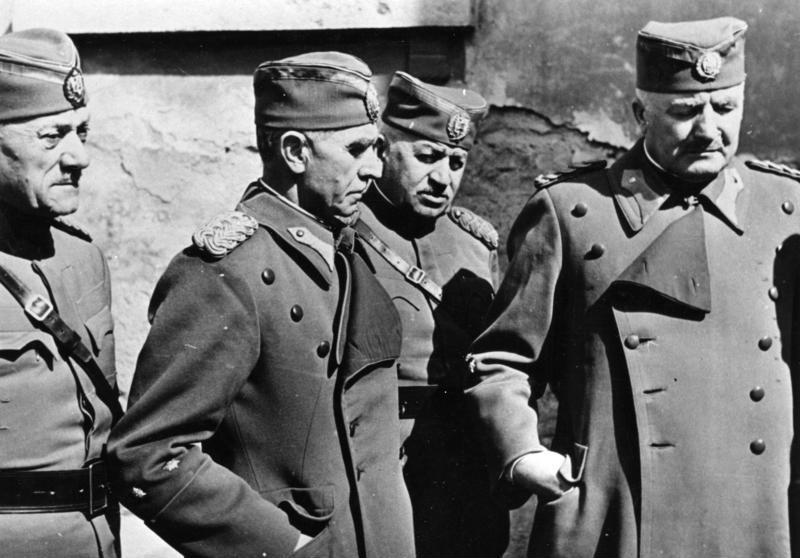
A group of captured Yugoslav generals in Zagreb

About 19:45, the 1st Army Group held a conference in Zagreb, just as German tanks were entering the city. Nedeljković told Petrović that he could no longer hold his positions, but despite this, Petrović ordered him to hold for at least two to three days to enable the withdrawal of the 7th Army to the Kupa river. Nedeljković replied that he no longer had an army, and suggested that all Serb officers and men be ordered back to form a defensive line along the Sava and Una rivers. Petrović refused to consider this, but ordered the 1st Cavalry Division to form a defensive line along the Sava between Jasenovac and Zagreb. The XXXXVI Motorised Corps encountered little resistance from the 4th Army, particularly from the 27th ID and 40th Infantry Division Slavonska on its right, and by the evening of 10 April the whole 4th Army was disintegrating. Petrović wanted to dismiss Marić as commander of the 27th ID due to suspicions that he was an Ustaše sympathiser, but could not identify a suitable replacement.

On 11 April, Petrović and the staff of 1st Army Group headquarters were captured by Ustaše at Petrinja, and the rear area staff of 4th Army headquarters were captured by Ustaše at Topusko. The personnel of both headquarters were soon handed over to the Germans by their captors. Nedeljković and his operations staff escaped to fight on for a few days, but the 27th ID had ceased to exist. On 15 April, Nedeljković received orders that a ceasefire had been agreed, and that all 4th Army troops were to remain in place and not fire on German personnel. After a delay in locating appropriate signatories for the surrender document, the Yugoslav Supreme Command unconditionally surrendered in Belgrade effective at 12:00 on 18 April. Yugoslavia was then occupied and dismembered by the Axis powers; Germany, Italy, Hungary, Bulgaria and Albania all annexed parts of its territory. Almost all of the Croat members of the division taken as prisoners of war were soon released by the Germans, as 90 percent of those held for the duration of the war were Serbs. Marić became the first chief-of-staff of the Croatian Home Guard when it was created in May 1941, but was removed from his post and retired that September, probably because the Ustaše leadership did not trust him.
