= Donjara =

Donjara may refer to:

- Ponjan, a Japanese game
- Donjara, Croatia, a village near Sokolovac, Koprivnica-Križevci County
