= Peščenik =

Peščenik may refer to:

- Peščenik, Slovenia, a village near Ivančna Gorica
- Peščenik, Croatia, a village near Sokolovac, Koprivnica-Križevci County
