= Kaich =

Croatian surname

Kaich is a surname of Croatian origin that was prevalent in the Pula, Zagreb, and Djurdjevac regions of Croatia. Alternative spellings as a family name include: Kaić, Káic, Kaiche, Kaicher, Kaichev, and Kaichen.

== The Kaić surname through centuries in the former Austro-Hungary ==
In Bačka (Bachka) during the Austro-Hungarian rule, the Slavic surnames ending with sound [ć] were often spelled according to German writing and the Latin spelling was used:

 Kai[ch]

also according to Hungarian spelling as:

 Kai[ts]  /  Kai[cs]  /  K[á]i[cs]  /  Kai[ty]  /  K[á]i[ty]

or even a mixture:

 K[á]i[ch]

While for comparison those Kaić's who lived under Venetian rule wrote their surname according to Italian spelling as:

 Cai[ch]

Such spelling deviation highlights the complications in naming conventions the south Slavic people were exposed under various foreign rules in the past centuries. This often created havoc and confusion for them in official and legal matters. In addition, the same spelling deviation of the past now represents a major headache for any genealogy research.

== The surname Kaich in English-speaking countries ==
The south Slavic surnames ending with sound [ć], are most often in English-speaking countries spelled with [ch]. Although sometimes with [cz], so, for example, the surname Kravi[ć] becomes Kravi[cz]. Anyway, a person with surname Kaich from the US attempting to pursue genealogy research back to its roots has to be prepared for difficulties due to the above-mentioned spelling deviations. The actual surname spelling is probably the least relevant factor, and one would rather have to take into account the other details, such as place of birth, date of birth, and if available the name of the parents. Not to mention the complication that all Christian names in Austro-Hungary were recorded in Latin language.

The word kaić is Croatian and is translated in English as "boat".
