= Jankovac =

Jankovac may refer to:

- Jankovac, Hungary, the Croatian name for Jánoshalma, a town in Bács-Kiskun county
- Jankovac, Croatia, a village near Sokolovac, Koprivnica-Križevci County
- Jankovac, Bosnia and Herzegovina, a village near Bihać
