= Repasi =

Repasi is a Hungarian surname. Notable people with the surname include:

- László Répási (born 1966), Hungarian footballer
- René Repasi (born 1979), German politician of Hungarian descent

== See also ==
- Repaš
