= Picokijada =

Cultural-tourist manifestation held in the Podravina town of Đurđevac in Croatia

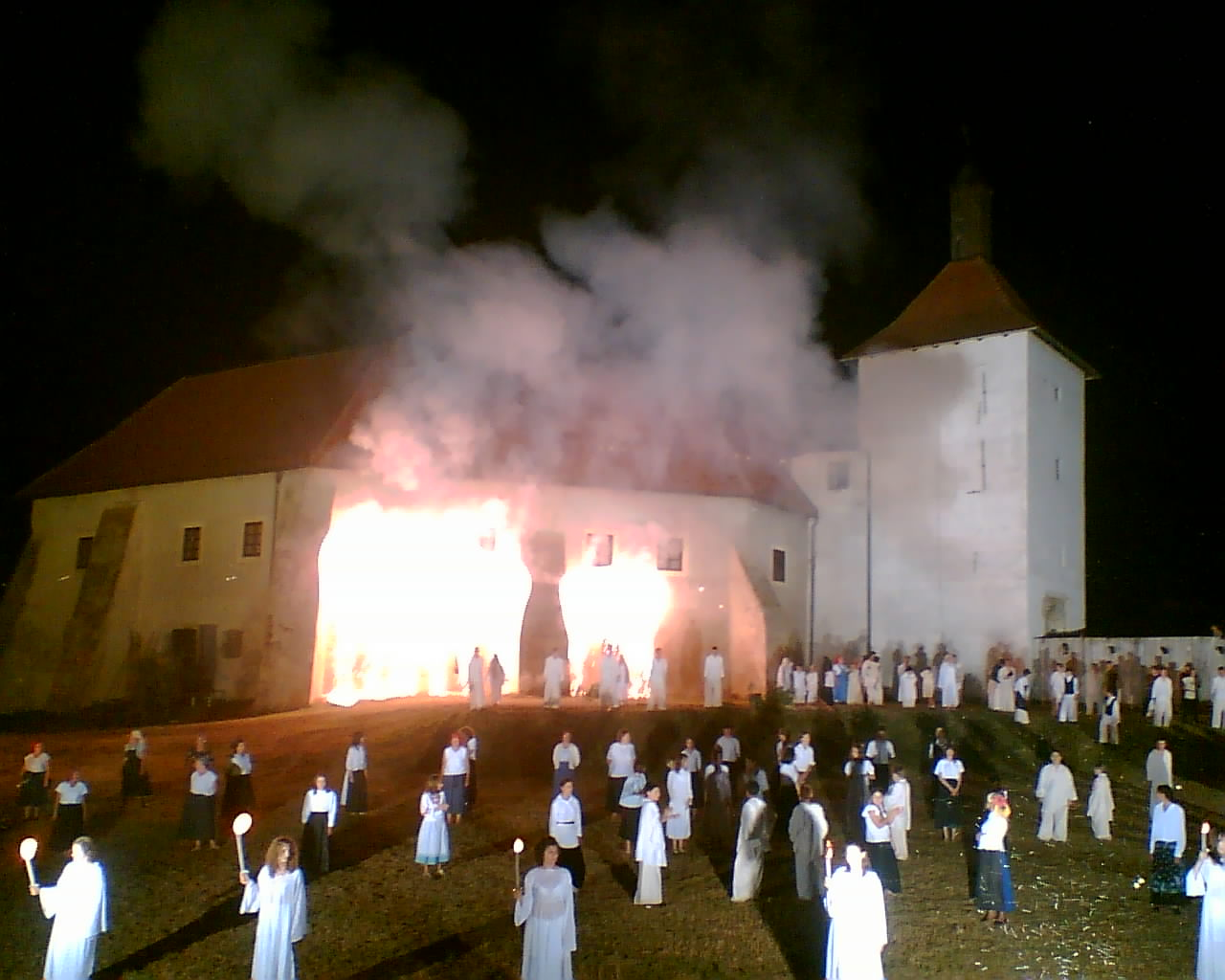
A scene from the production of Legenda o picokima

Picokijada (Croatian: [pitsɔkijada]) is a traditional cultural-tourist manifestation that has been held since 1968 at the end of June in the town of Đurđevac in northern Croatia. The event festivities last three days, with the main event being the Legenda o picokima ("Legend of the Rooster"), a remembrance of the defense of the town Đurđevac from the Ottoman Turks.

The Legenda o picokima is set in the time of the attack of the Ottoman forces on the Old town Đurđevac. After the army of Ulama-beg encountered unexpected resistance and failed to take Đurđevac fortress, he decided to enact a long siege, with the goal of starving the army people that hid inside.

== Origins ==
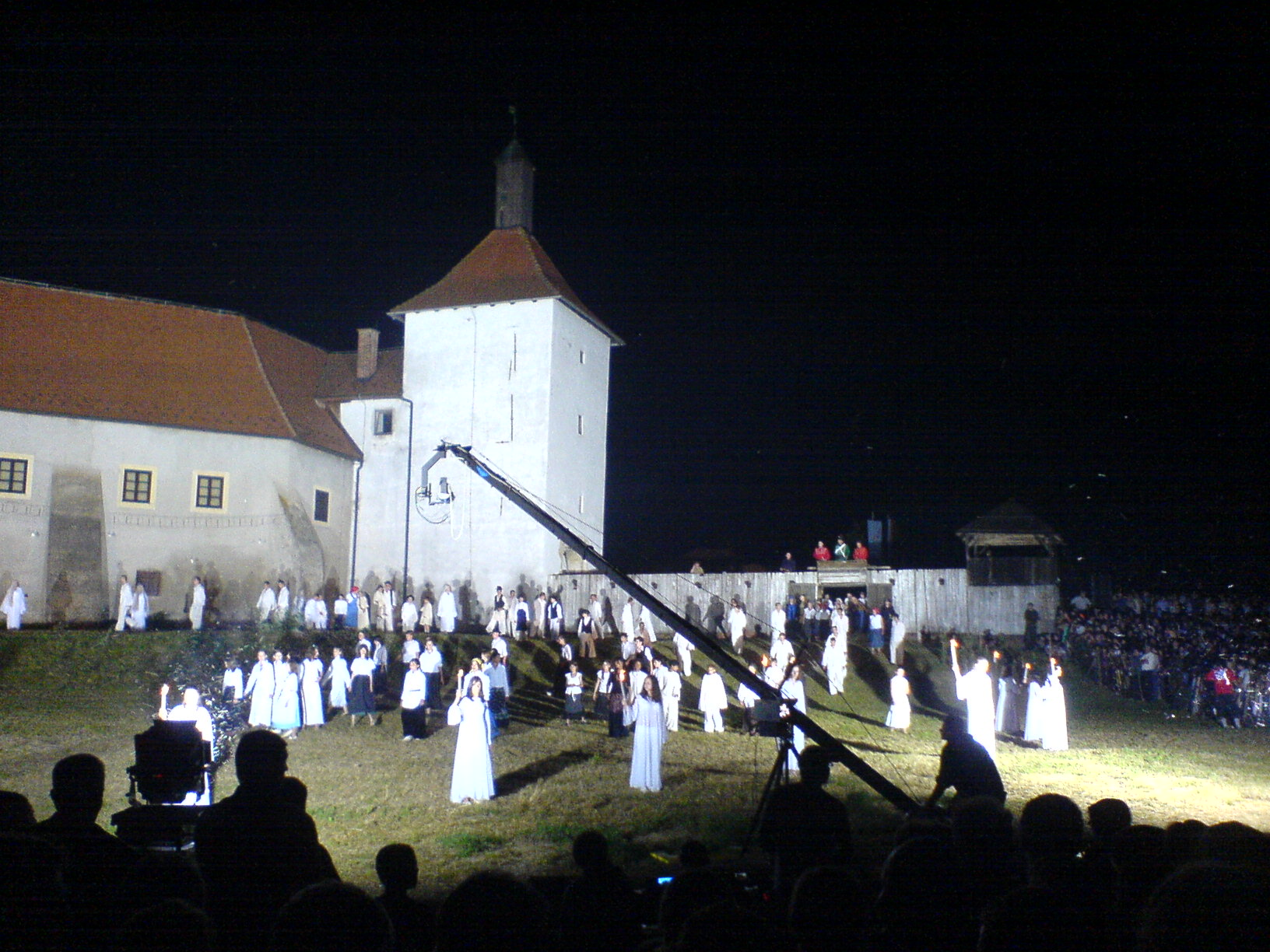
Legenda o picokima

According to oral tradition, in the 16th century the Ottomans army laid siege on the town and eventually surrounded of the fortress. Eventually no food source was left save for one small rooster (picok). Since it was not enough to feed the people, an old woman suggested that the captain fire the rooster from the cannon and into the Ottoman camp, which he did.

After the rooster attack, Ulama-beg surmised that if the town could shoot a source of food, they must have plenty of supplies. He thus ended the siege and left the battlefield, but not before cursing the people of Đurđevac as Picoki or "roosters".

== Modern ==
The story was first written down in 1898 by Tomo Jalžabetić while describing the customs and traditions of Đurđevac.

Yearly celebrations have taken place since 1968 with the festivals becoming a large tourist attraction for the region of Podravina. Many local townspeople take part in acting and producing the play, with local groups and school-children contributing to the festivities. Since 2006, the event has been under the protection of the Republic of Croatia Ministry of Culture as an intangible cultural heritage of Republic of Croatia.

A large stage production is put on every year in front of the Đurđevac fortress, depicting the siege along with the rooster's role, culminating with the memorable curse by Ulama-beg to the town: A vi tamo, pernati junaci, što picekima bojeve bijete, ime PICOKA dovijeka nosili! PICOKIMA vas djeca zvala, a unuci vaši ostat će PICOKI! (”And you there, feathered heroes, that fight battles with roosters, shall always carry the name roosters! Your children shall call you roosters, and your grandchildren will stay roosters!”)

== See also ==
- Natural and Cultural Heritage of Croatia
