= Donja Brckovčina =

Coordinates: 46°01′N 16°31′E

- Village
- Interactive map of Donja Brckovčina
- Country: Croatia
- County: Koprivnica-Križevci County
- Municipality: Križevci

Area
  - Total: 2.2 km^{2} (0.85 sq mi)

Population (2021)
  - Total: 132
  - Density: 60/km^{2} (160/sq mi)
- Time zone: UTC+1 (CET)
  - Summer (DST): UTC+2 (CEST)

Donja Brckovčina is a village in Croatia. It is connected by the D41 highway.
