= Suha Katalena =

Coordinates: 45°56′50″N 17°05′20″E

- Village
- Interactive map of Suha Katalena
- Country: Croatia

Area
  - Total: 7.9 sq mi (20.4 km^{2})

Population (2021)
  - Total: 285
  - Density: 36.2/sq mi (14.0/km^{2})
- Time zone: UTC+1 (CET)
  - Summer (DST): UTC+2 (CEST)

Suha Katalena is a village in Croatia in the Đurđevac municipality.
