= Čingi-Lingi =

- Interactive map of Čingi-Lingi
- Location within Croatia
- Coordinates: 46°08′11″N 17°03′14″E
- Country: Croatia
- County: Koprivnica-Križevci
- Municipality: Molve

Area
  - Total: 0.6 km^{2} (0.23 sq mi)

Population (2021)
  - Total: 19
  - Density: 32/km^{2} (82/sq mi)
- Time zone: UTC+1 (CET)
  - Summer (DST): UTC+2 (CEST)
- Postal code: 48350 Đurđevac
- Area code: +385 (0)48

Čingi-Lingi is a village in the Municipality of Molve, Croatia. In the 2021 census, it had 19 permanent residents.

It is located in a natural environment along the Drava River and is the main tourist destination of the Municipality and the entire surrounding area.

== History ==
The village was named after the nearby lake which got its name from the Čingi Lingi Čarda, a restaurant near Osijek.

There used to be a canal on the river Drava here, with two watermills. The canal was later filled in, and gravel began to be excavated nearby, which people would transport in carts with horse or cow teams. Over the years, more and more gravel was excavated and the lake became larger, and the name Čingi Lingi spread among swimmers and residents of the surrounding villages. The first resident by the lake was the barber Pero Glavanović, who lived there in a wooden shack, but residents of Bjelovar, Molve and Koprivnica also came to the lake in increasing numbers. They began to build weekend houses, but today there are more and more residents who live here permanently.

The settlement of Čingi Lingi was established next to one of the three lakes and is certainly one of the youngest in the county. Today, there are 186 houses in the settlement and in addition to electricity and public lighting, the settlement has gas and water supply.

== Demographics ==
In 2021, the settlement had 19 residents of which 9 were men and 10 were women.

Čingi-Lingi: Population trends 1857–2021
v

population															4	9	19
	1857	1869	1880	1890	1900	1910	1921	1931	1948	1953	1961	1971	1981	1991	2001	2011	2021

Sources: Croatian Bureau of Statistics publications
