= Čivićevac =

Stream in Croatia

Coordinates: 46°03′N 17°04′E

Čivićevac is a perennial stream in Koprivnica-Križevci County, Croatia, flowing near the center of the town of Đurđevac. It is a minor right-bank tributary of the Drava.
