= Sands of Đurđevac =

Area of sand dunes near Đurđevac, Croatia

Coordinates: 46.029°N 17.099°E

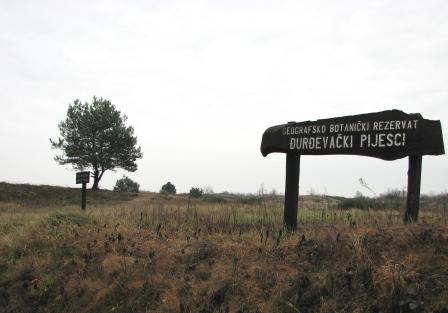
Đurđevečki peski

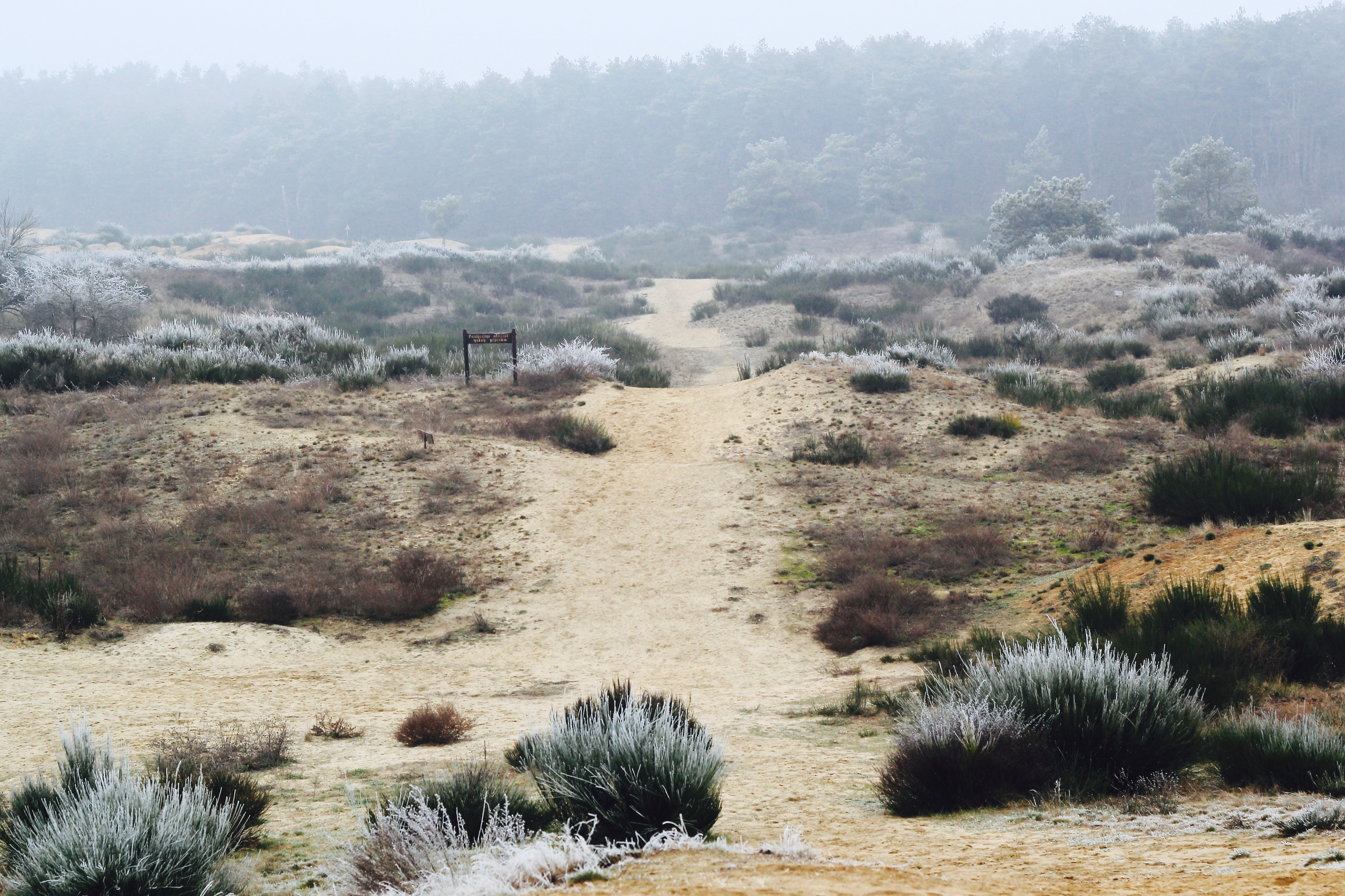
Frost during the winter season.

The Sands of Đurđevac (Croatian: Đurđevački pijesci, Đurđevečki peski) is an area of partially stabilized sand dunes in the eastern part of the City of Đurđevac, Croatia. The region is sometimes called the Croatian Sahara, and Bloody Sands (Krvavi peski).

This is a protected botanical area, distinctive habitats with a large number of endemic species, unique flora and fauna, and visible forms of sand dunes, and the remains of the "Croatian Sahara". The sands occupy about 20 hectares and in 1963, part of it was declared a special geographical and botanical reserve as an easily recognizable and unique habitat in Croatia, and the intention of preserving the great diversity of vegetation, where the conditions of life on the sand could develop and adapt to certain plant species; among others, and around 30 species of butterflies . With endemic species, there are also visible remains of sand dunes . On the remains of the desert is Đurđevac city district, which is the desert's namesake. It is separated from the rest Đurđevac by a stream called Čivićevec, and (with about 2,200 residents, which is a third of the total population of the city itself) is the largest Đurđevac suburb.

== Bibliography ==
=== Biology ===
- Šašić, Martina; Nahirnić, Ana; Tarmann, Gerhard M. (2016-12-31). "Zygaenidae (Lepidoptera) in the Lepidoptera collections of the Croatian Natural History Museum". Natura Croatica: Periodicum Musei Historiae Naturalis Croatici. 25 (2): 233–248. doi:10.20302/NC.2016.25.19. eISSN 1848-7386.
