= Carevdar =

Coordinates: 46°04′N 16°38′E

- Village
- Interactive map of Carevdar
- Country: Croatia
- County: Koprivnica-Križevci County

Area
  - Total: 8.8 km^{2} (3.4 sq mi)

Population (2021)
  - Total: 350
  - Density: 40/km^{2} (100/sq mi)
- Time zone: UTC+1 (CET)
  - Summer (DST): UTC+2 (CEST)

Carevdar is a village in Croatia. It is connected by the D41 highway.
