= 40th Infantry Division Slavonska =

Royal Yugoslav Army formation

- Active: 1935 – 18 April 1941
- Country: Yugoslavia
- Branch: Royal Yugoslav Army
- Type: Infantry
- Size: Division
- Part of: 4th Army
- Patron: Slavonia
- Engagements: World War II: Invasion of Yugoslavia

Commanders
- Notable commanders: Ratko Raketić

The 40th Infantry Division Slavonska was an infantry formation of the Royal Yugoslav Army that formed part of the 4th Army during the German-led Axis invasion of the Kingdom of Yugoslavia in April 1941. It was partly mobilised from the Osječka military district, and, like all Yugoslav infantry divisions of the time, was a very large and unwieldy formation which was almost entirely reliant on animal transport for mobility. Commanded by Brigadni đeneral Ratko Raketić, it was largely manned by Croat troops, many of whom saw the Germans as potential liberators from Serbian oppression during the interwar period, and the division also lacked modern arms and sufficient ammunition.

The preliminary attacks launched across the Drava by the Germans on 6 April were enough to spark revolts within the units of the division. One of its three infantry regiments rebelled the following day, and by 8 April the rebels had taken over Bjelovar. The division continued to disintegrate over the following days, then crumbled in the face of the combined arms assault of the 8th Panzer Division when it broke out of its bridgehead at Barcs on 10 April. A few mainly Serb remnants of the division continued to withdraw into Bosnia over the next week until a ceasefire was negotiated on 15 April. The Yugoslav Army surrendered on 18 April.

== Background ==
A map showing the location of Yugoslavia in Europe

The Kingdom of Serbs, Croats and Slovenes was created with the merger of Serbia, Montenegro and the South Slav-inhabited areas of Austria-Hungary on 1 December 1918, in the immediate aftermath of World War I. The Army of the Kingdom of Serbs, Croats and Slovenes was established to defend the new state. It was formed around the nucleus of the victorious Royal Serbian Army, as well as armed formations raised in regions formerly controlled by Austria-Hungary. Many former Austro-Hungarian officers and soldiers became members of the new army. From the beginning, much like other aspects of public life in the new kingdom, the army was dominated by ethnic Serbs, who saw it as a means by which to secure Serb political hegemony.

The army's development was hampered by the kingdom's poor economy, and this continued during the 1920s. In 1929, King Alexander changed the name of the country to the Kingdom of Yugoslavia, at which time the army was renamed the Royal Yugoslav Army (Serbo-Croatian Latin: Vojska Kraljevine Jugoslavije, VKJ). The army budget remained tight, and as tensions rose across Europe during the 1930s, it became difficult to secure weapons and munitions from other countries. Consequently, at the time World War II broke out in September 1939, the VKJ had several serious weaknesses, which included reliance on draught animals for transport, and the large size of its formations. Infantry divisions had a wartime strength of 26,000–27,000 men, as compared to contemporary British infantry divisions of half that strength. These characteristics resulted in slow, unwieldy formations, and the inadequate supply of arms and munitions meant that even the very large Yugoslav formations had low firepower. Generals better suited to the trench warfare of World War I were combined with an army that was neither equipped nor trained to resist the fast-moving combined arms approach used by the Germans in their invasions of Poland and France.

The weaknesses of the VKJ in strategy, structure, equipment, mobility and supply were exacerbated by serious ethnic disunity within Yugoslavia, resulting from two decades of Serb hegemony and the attendant lack of political legitimacy achieved by the central government. Attempts to address the disunity came too late to ensure that the VKJ was a cohesive force. Fifth column activity was also a serious concern, not only from the Croatian nationalist Ustaše but also from the country's Slovene and ethnic German minorities.

== Structure ==
=== Peacetime organisation ===
According to regulations issued by the VKJ in 1935, the headquarters of the 40th Infantry Division Slavonska (40th ID) would be created at the time of mobilisation. Unlike most other Yugoslav divisions, the 40th ID did not have a corresponding divisional district in peacetime, and would be allocated units from other divisional districts and the VKJ reserve when it was formed. The division was named for the region of Slavonia.

=== Wartime organisation ===
The wartime organisation of the VKJ was laid down by regulations issued in 1936–37, which set the strength of an infantry division at 26,000–27,000 men. A total of 11,200 horses and other pack and draught animals were required to provide mobility for each infantry division. The theoretical wartime organisation of a fully mobilised Yugoslav infantry division was:

- headquarters
- divisional infantry headquarters, with three or four infantry regiments
- divisional artillery headquarters, with one or two artillery regiments
- a cavalry battalion with two squadrons, a bicycle squadron and a machine gun platoon
- a pioneer battalion of three companies
- an anti-tank company, equipped with twelve 37 mm (1.5 in) or 47 mm (1.9 in) anti-tank guns
- a machine gun company
- an anti-aircraft machine gun company
- a signals company
- logistics units

Each infantry regiment was to consist of three to four infantry battalions, a machine gun company, and the divisional artillery regiments were animal-drawn and largely equipped with World War I-vintage pieces. An artillery regiment consisted of four battalions, one of 100 mm (3.9 in) light howitzers, one of 65 mm (2.6 in) or 75 mm (3.0 in) mountain guns, and two of 75 mm (3.0 in) or 80 mm (3.1 in) field guns. In September 1939, after the German invasion of Poland, the 40th ID underwent a trial mobilisation which included a large proportion of its units.

The 40th ID was included on the wartime order of battle in "Defence Plan S", which was developed by the Yugoslav General Staff in 1938–1939. It was to be formed using mainly Croat-manned units. These comprised the Bjelovar-based 42nd Infantry Regiment from the Osječka divisional district, and the 43rd and 108th Infantry Regiments and 40th Artillery Regiment from the VJK reserve.

== Planned deployment ==
Planned deployment locations for 40th ID and flanking formations

The 40th ID was a component of the 4th Army as part of the 1st Army Group, which was responsible for the defence of north and northwestern Yugoslavia. The 4th Army was to deploy in a cordon along the western sector of the Hungarian border, with the 40th ID opposite the Hungarian town of Barcs, between Kloštar Podravski and Čađavica, with the main line of defence along the northern slopes of the Bilogora mountain range, and divisional headquarters at Pivnica Slavonska. On the left flank of the division was the 27th Infantry Division Savska (27th ID) opposite the Hungarian village of Gyékényes, and on the right flank was the 17th Infantry Division Vrbaska (17th ID) of the 2nd Army, which formed part of the 2nd Army Group, with the boundary running from just east of Slatina through Požega towards Banja Luka. The only border guard unit in the division's area was the 2nd Battalion of the 393rd Reserve Regiment.

== Operations ==
=== Mobilisation ===
After unrelenting pressure from Adolf Hitler, Yugoslavia signed the Tripartite Pact on 25 March 1941. On 27 March, a military coup d'état overthrew the government that had signed the pact, and a new government was formed under the Royal Yugoslav Army Air Force commander, Armijski đeneral (Note: Equivalent to a U.S. Army lieutenant general.) Dušan Simović. A general mobilisation was not called by the new government until 3 April 1941, out of fear of offending Hitler and thus precipitating war. However, on the same day as the coup Hitler issued Führer Directive 25 which called for Yugoslavia to be treated as a hostile state, and on 3 April, Führer Directive 26 was issued, detailing the plan of attack and command structure for the invasion, which was to commence on 6 April.

As the Axis invasion began, the 40th ID was partially mobilised, with some elements of the division still mobilising, some in concentration areas, and only a small proportion actually deployed in their planned positions:

- the divisional commander Brigadni đeneral (Note: Equivalent to a U.S. Army brigadier general.) Ratko Raketić and his headquarters staff were mobilising in Bjelovar
- the 42nd Infantry Regiment with two battalions was marching towards their positions near Daruvar, while the rest of the regiment was mobilising in Bjelovar and could not move due to lack of draught animals
- the 43rd Infantry Regiment, with about 75–80 percent of its troops and 30 percent of its animals, was marching from its mobilisation centre in Požega towards Našice, but had only reached Jakšić, 9 kilometres (5.6 mi) northeast of Požega
- the 108th Infantry Regiment was marching from Bjelovar but had only reached Severin
- the 40th Artillery Regiment was still mobilising with the headquarters and one battalion in Osijek and two battalions in Varaždin
- the divisional cavalry battalion and machine gun battalion were unable to deploy from Virovitica due to lack of animals, although on 5 April, Nedeljković had requisitioned private cars for the machine gun battalion and ordered it to concentrate at Lukač northeast of Virovitica
- the remainder of the divisional units were at their mobilisation centres in and around Bjelovar

The 43rd Infantry Regiment was ordered to march east to join the 17th ID, which was part of the 2nd Army Group's 2nd Army. The 89th Infantry Regiment, originally allocated to the 17th ID, was ordered to march from its mobilisation location in Sisak and join the 40th ID to replace the 43rd Infantry Regiment. The divisional cavalry battalion did not receive sufficient horses, and had to deploy on foot as infantry. The division was without artillery support throughout the fighting because the 40th Artillery Regiment did not complete mobilisation.

=== 6 April ===
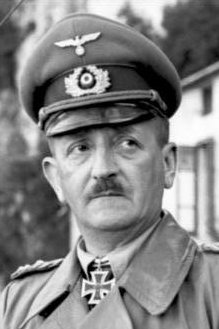
General der Panzertruppe Heinrich von Vietinghoff commanded the XXXXVI Motorised Corps

German Army headquarters wanted to capture the bridges over the Drava intact, and from 1 April had issued orders to the 2nd Army of Generaloberst (Note: Equivalent to a U.S. Army general.) Maximilian von Weichs to conduct preliminary operations aimed at seizing the bridge at Barcs and the railway bridge northeast of Koprivnica by coup de main. As a result, limited objective attacks were launched along the line of the Drava by the XXXXVI Motorised Corps, commanded by General der Panzertruppe (Note: Equivalent to a U.S. Army lieutenant general.) Heinrich von Vietinghoff, despite the fact that they were not expected to launch offensive operations until 10 April. During the day, the Luftwaffe (German Air Force) bombed and strafed Yugoslav positions and troops on the march, and by the evening it had become clear to the Germans that the Yugoslavs would not be resisting stubbornly at the border. XXXXVI Motorised Corps was then ordered to begin seizing bridges over the Drava, including at Barcs. The local attacks were sufficient to inflame dissent among the Croat troops of the 4th Army, who refused to resist Germans they considered their liberators from Serbian oppression during the interwar period.

The continuing mobilisation and concentration of the 4th Army was hampered by escalating fifth column activities and propaganda fomented by the Ustaše. Some units stopped mobilising, or began returning to their mobilisation centres from their concentration areas. The Yugoslav radio network linking the division with the 4th Army and flanking divisions was sabotaged by the Ustaše on 6 April, and radio communications within the 4th Army remained poor throughout the fighting.

=== 7 April ===
About 19:00 on 7 April, German units in regimental strength with a few tanks began to cross the Drava near Barcs in the divisional sector. They quickly overcame the resistance of the 2nd Battalion of the 393rd Reserve Regiment, which was influenced by Ustaše propaganda. The border guards abandoned their positions and weapons and retreated to Virovitica. The 108th Infantry Regiment of the division had mobilised in Bjelovar and on 7 April was marching towards Virovitica to take up positions. That night, Croat members of the regiment revolted, arresting the Serb officers, non-commissioned officers and soldiers. The regiment then marched back to Bjelovar, where it joined up with other rebellious units about noon on 8 April.

As the 108th Infantry Regiment was responsible for the right sector of the divisional defence, this meant that the 42nd Infantry Regiment, which was originally responsible only for the left sector, had to extend across the entire divisional frontage. During the night, the commander of the divisional cavalry battalion sent patrols towards the German bridgehead, but local Ustaše sympathisers misled them into believing the Germans were already across the Drava at Barcs in strength. The Germans were subsequently able to consolidate their bridgehead at Barcs overnight.

=== 8 April ===
On 8 April, the German XXXXVI Motorised Corps continued with its limited objective attacks to expand their bridgehead at Barcs. A German regiment broke through the border troops and approached Virovitica. At this point, the entire divisional sector was defended by a single unit, the divisional cavalry battalion, which had been transported there in requisitioned cars due to the lack of horses. Two understrength and wavering battalions of the 42nd Infantry Regiment arrived at Pčelić, 15 kilometres (9.3 mi) southwest of Virovitica.

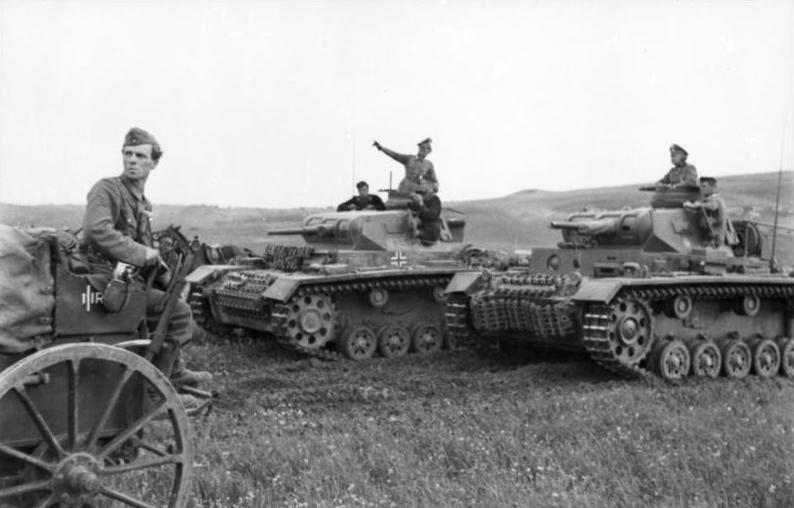
The Germans expanded their bridgehead over the Drava at Barcs on 8 April

By noon, the rebels of the 108th Infantry Regiment were approaching Bjelovar, and were joined by elements of the 42nd Infantry Regiment and other units of the division. The leader of the rebels in Bjelovar was Kapetan (Note: Equivalent to a U.S. Army captain.) Ivan Mrak, a reserve aviator. When 4th Army commander Armijski đeneral Petar Nedeljković became aware of the rebels' approach, he ordered the local gendarmerie commander to maintain order, but was advised this would not be possible, as local gendarmerie conscripts would not report for duty. His headquarters reported the presence of the rebels to the headquarters of the 1st Army Group, suggesting that the Royal Yugoslav Army Air Force could bomb the rebel units. The 8th Bomber Regiment at Rovine was even warned to receive orders to use its Bristol Blenheim Mk I light bombers to bomb the 108th Infantry Regiment, but the idea was subsequently abandoned. Instead, it was decided to request that the leader of the Croatian Peasant Party, Vladko Maček, intervene with the rebels.

Josip Broz Tito and the Central Committee of the Communist Party of Yugoslavia, then located in Zagreb, along with the Central Committee of the Communist Party of Croatia, sent a delegation to 4th Army headquarters in Bjelovar urging them to issue arms to workers to help defend Zagreb. Pavle Gregorić, who was a member of both Central Committees, went to the headquarters twice, and was able to speak briefly with Nedeljković, but could not convince him to do so. On the same day, Maček, who had returned to Zagreb after briefly joining the post-Yugoslav coup d'état government of Dušan Simović, agreed to send an emissary to the 108th Infantry Regiment urging them to obey their officers, but they did not respond to his appeal.

Later in the day, two trucks of rebels arrived at 4th Army headquarters with the intention of killing the staff. The headquarters guard force prevented this, but the operations staff immediately withdrew from Bjelovar to Popovača. After the rebels issued several unanswered ultimatums, around 8,000 rebels attacked Bjelovar, assisted by fifth-columnists within the city. The city then surrendered, and many Yugoslav officers and soldiers were captured by the rebels. When Nedeljković heard of the fall of the city, he called the Mayor of Bjelovar, Julije Makanec and threatened to bomb the city if the prisoners were not immediately released. Detained officers from 4th Army headquarters and the 108th Infantry Regiment were then sent to Zagreb. About 16:00, Nedeljković informed the Ban of Croatia, Ivan Šubašić, of the revolt, but Šubašić was powerless to influence events. About 18:00, Makanec proclaimed that Bjelovar was part of an independent Croatian state.

=== 9 April ===
On the morning of 9 April, the German bridgehead at Barcs had expanded to Lukač, 7 kilometres (4.3 mi) north of Virovitica. Following up the withdrawal of the divisional cavalry battalion, the Germans seized Suhopolje, west of Virovitica, cutting the main road to Slatina, and the rebel Croat troops at Bjelovar made contact with them. By 11:00, the divisional front line consisted of the 1st and 2nd Battalions of the 42nd Infantry Regiment and a company of the divisional cavalry battalion on the right, and the 4th Battalion of the 42nd Infantry Regiment and a company of the divisional cavalry battalion on the left. The 3rd Battalion of the 42nd Infantry Regiment was held in depth. The left flank was screened by the rest of the divisional cavalry battalion deployed around Pitomača. The 89th Infantry Regiment, marching from its concentration area in Sisak, arrived at divisional headquarters at Pivnica Slavonska, to replace the 43rd Infantry Regiment, which had been transferred to the 17th ID.

Other reinforcements included elements of the 4th Army anti-aircraft units sent from Lipik, but the divisional artillery regiment had not completed mobilisation. The rebels in Bjelovar issued false orders to the 1st Battalion of the 42nd Infantry Regiment, directing it to fall back to Bjelovar. At 11:15, Nedeljković arrived at divisional headquarters and shortly afterwards ordered Raketić to launch a counterattack on the German bridgehead at Barcs at dawn the following day. Nedeljković also visited Divizijski đeneral (Note: Equivalent to a U.S. Army major general.) Dragoslav Milosavljević, the commander of the 17th ID on the right flank of the 4th Army, to arrange support from that division during the pending attack. However, because the majority of that division's troops had yet to arrive from Bosnia, all it was able to do was advance its left flank, stationing battalions in Čačinci and Crnac west of Slatina. The 40th ID spent the remainder of the day preparing for the counterattack, but were hindered by German artillery and air attacks. In an indication of the state of his division, during a visit to the front line, Raketić and his chief of staff were fired at by troops of the 42nd Infantry Regiment.

Elements of the 4th Army began to withdraw southwards on 9 April. On the night of 9/10 April, those Croats that had remained with their units also began to desert or turn on their commanders, and in the 40th ID, almost all the remaining troops were Serbs. Due to the increasing momentum of the revolt, the commander of the 1st Army Group, Armijski đeneral Milorad Petrović concluded that the 4th Army was no longer an effective formation and could not resist the Germans. Maček issued a further ineffectual plea to calm the rebellion. On the evening of 9 April, Weichs was ready to launch major offensive operations from the bridgeheads on the following day. His plan involved two main thrusts. The first would be spearheaded by the 14th Panzer Division of Generalmajor (Note: Equivalent to a U.S. Army brigadier general.) Friedrich Kühn breaking out of the Zákány bridgehead and drive towards Zagreb. The second would see Generalmajor Walter Neumann-Silkow's 8th Panzer Division break out of the Barcs bridgehead and turn east between the Drava and Sava rivers to attack towards Belgrade.

=== 10 April ===
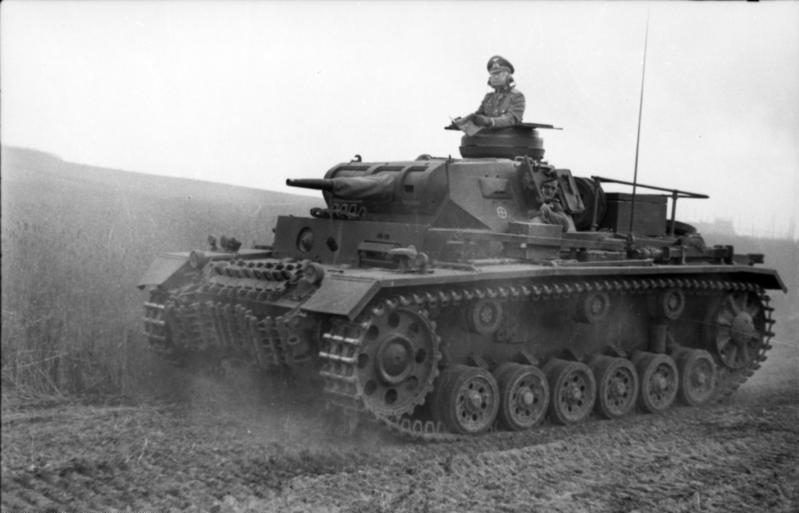
The 8th Panzer Division broke out of the Barcs bridgehead on 10 April

The 40th ID was battered by German artillery fire during the night 9/10 April. Seriously depleted by desertion and weakened by revolt, it was unable to mount the ordered counterattack against the Barcs bridgehead on the morning of 10 April. The 42nd Infantry Regiment could only muster 600 men, and the 89th Infantry Regiment only slightly more. The divisional cavalry battalion was also heavily reduced in strength, and divisional artillery amounted to one anti-aircraft battery. The border units, responsible for demolition tasks on the line from Bjelovar south to Čazma, refused to follow orders. Having abandoned the counterattack, Raketić decided to establish a defensive line at Pćelić to hinder German movement east towards Slatina.

Soon after dawn, the main thrust of the XXXXVI Motorised Corps, consisting of the 8th Panzer Division crossed the Drava at Barcs, leading the 16th Motorised Infantry Division of Generalmajor Sigfrid Henrici. Anti-tank fire destroyed a few of the lead tanks, but after the Germans reinforced their vanguard, the resistance of the 40th ID had been broken by noon. The remaining troops of the 42nd Infantry Regiment were either captured or fled into the hills to the south. Units of the 89th Infantry Regiment, which had been providing depth to the defensive position, began retreating south towards Požega. Ustaše sympathisers and Yugoslav Volksdeutsche (ethnic German) troops either ran away or surrendered. By 13:30, the hard-pressed divisional cavalry battalion began to withdraw south towards Daruvar, attacking rebelling troops along their route. Raketić himself fled to Nova Gradiška via Voćin and Požega, during which his car was again fired on by rebel troops. The 8th Panzer Division continued southeast between the Drava and Sava rivers, and meeting almost no further resistance, had reached Slatina by evening. Right flank elements of the 8th Panzer Division penetrated south into the Bilogora range, reaching Daruvar and Voćin by evening.

Late in the day, as the situation was becoming increasingly desperate throughout the country, Simović, who was both the Prime Minister and Yugoslav Chief of the General Staff, broadcast the following message:

All troops must engage the enemy wherever encountered and with every means at their disposal. Don't wait for direct orders from above, but act on your own and be guided by your judgement, initiative, and conscience.

The XXXXVI Motorised Corps encountered little resistance from the 40th ID, and by the evening of 10 April the whole 4th Army was disintegrating. About 23:00, German 2nd Army headquarters directed the 8th Panzer and 16th Motorised Infantry Divisions to drive to the north of Belgrade to link up with the First Panzer Group which was thrusting to towards Belgrade from the east. At midnight, 2nd Army headquarters declared that the Yugoslav northern front had been decisively defeated, and tasked corps engineer units to consolidate bridging across the major rivers. The main body units of the XXXXVI Motorised Corps moved forward to Virovitica and Slatina. At midnight, Vietinghoff issued orders for the 8th Panzer Division to continue towards Belgrade via Osijek, but directed the 16th Motorised Infantry Division to thrust west as far as Sremska Mitrovica then turn south to drive towards Sarajevo via Zvornik.

=== 11 April ===
On 11 April, the rear area staff of 4th Army headquarters were captured by Ustaše at Topusko, and were soon handed over to the Germans by their captors. Nedeljković and his operations staff escaped, and made their way to Prijedor. Other units were retreating into Bosnia, including two battalions and 2–3 artillery batteries from the 40th ID. Nedeljković attempted to deploy rear area units of the 17th ID into a defensive line along the Una at Bosanska Dubica, Bosanska Kostajnica, Bosanski Novi, Bosanska Krupa and Bihać, and called Yugoslav Supreme Command in Sarajevo to request reinforcements. With his remaining troops, Raketić attempted to establish a defensive line along the Sava between Jasenovac and the mouth of the Vrbas. These efforts were significantly hampered by Ustaše propaganda. The German orders for the following day were to pursue the remnants of the Yugoslav Army through Bosnia towards Sarajevo, where they would be met by the First Panzer Group attacking from the south and east. The 8th Panzer Division and 16th Motorised Infantry Division faced almost no resistance as they drove east towards Belgrade, capturing Našice, Osijek, Vinkovci and Vukovar during the day. On the night of 11/12 April, they captured Sremska Mitrovica, Ruma and secured a crossing over the Danube via an undamaged bridge near Bogojevo.

=== Fate ===
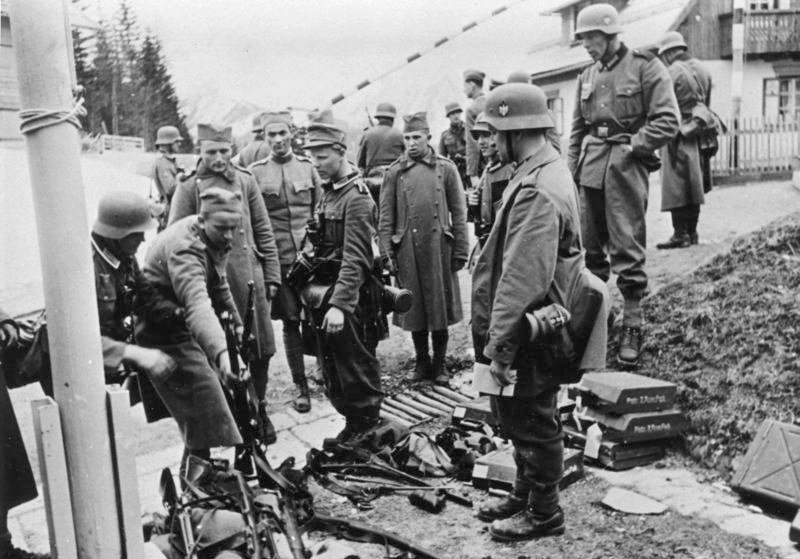
Surrendered Yugoslav troops handing in their weapons

The following day, the northern column of the 14th Panzer Division drove via Glina and crossed the Una at both Bosanska Kostajnica and Bosanski Novi before continuing its push east. Elements of the LI Corps also pushed east, establishing bridgeheads over the Kupa. A fragment of the 40th ID, numbering around 300 troops, which had been holding a position on the Sava at Bosanska Gradiška, retreated to Jajce via Banja Luka. When they arrived at Jajce, Nedeljković ordered them to take up blocking positions in the narrow Vrbas valley at Krupa on the road between Banja Luka and Mrkonjić Grad. The rear area units of the 17th ID were ordered to block the road from Kotor Varoš to Doboj.

In response to Nedeljković's request for reinforcements, Simović had sent a number of units by rail via Tuzla. These included a cadet battalion and a company of the 27th Infantry Regiment, detached from the 1st Infantry Division Cerska. By the time the reinforcements arrived, Banja Luka had been evacuated in the face of German tanks and an Ustaše-led revolt. The cadet battalion was redirected to Ključ to block the road Ključ – Mrkonjić Grad – Jajce. Nedeljković did not have the option of withdrawing via Bugojno or Prozor as those towns had been taken over by the Ustaše.

On 14 April, under pressure from the 14th Panzer Division, remnants of the 4th Army continued to withdraw towards Sarajevo via Jajce and Travnik. The cadet battalion at Ključ managed to briefly delay the German advance through Mrkonjić Grad, but were overcome by tanks and air attacks. The bridge at Jajce was demolished at 23:15, and Nedeljković withdrew his headquarters to Travnik. The remaining units of the 4th Army continued to disintegrate. The vanguard of the northern column of 14th Panzer Division surged forward to Teslić, with the central column only reaching Jajce.

Early on 15 April, the northern column of the 14th Panzer Division closed on Doboj, and after overcoming resistance around that town, arrived in Sarajevo at 20:45. Before noon, Nedeljković received orders that a ceasefire had been agreed, and that all 4th Army troops were to remain in place and not fire on German personnel. After a delay in locating appropriate signatories for the surrender document, the Yugoslav Supreme Command unconditionally surrendered in Belgrade effective at 12:00 on 18 April. Yugoslavia was then occupied and dismembered by the Axis powers, with Germany, Italy, Hungary, Bulgaria and Albania all annexing parts of its territory. Almost all of the Croat members of the 40th ID taken as prisoners of war were soon released by the Axis powers, as 90 per cent of those held for the duration of the war were Serbs.
