= Majurec =

Coordinates: 46°02′N 16°35′E

- Village
- Interactive map of Majurec
- Country: Croatia
- County: Koprivnica-Križevci County

Area
  - Total: 1.2 sq mi (3.2 km^{2})

Population (2021)
  - Total: 385
  - Density: 310/sq mi (120/km^{2})
- Time zone: UTC+1 (CET)
  - Summer (DST): UTC+2 (CEST)

Majurec is a village in Croatia. It is connected by the D41 highway.
