= Seperacija =

Lake in Croatia

Seperacija is an artificial lake near Đurđevac, Croatia. It is a gravel pit, created in the mid-1960s.

== Sources ==
- https://web.archive.org/web/20130312001757/http://www.zsrk-djurdjevac.com/separacija.php (in Croatian)
