= Molve Grede =

Coordinates: 46°03′41″N 17°02′35″E

Molve Grede Molvanske Grede
- Village
- Interactive map of Molve Grede
- Country: Croatia
- Region: Podravina
- County: Koprivnica-Križevci
- Municipality: Molve

Area
  - Total: 7.6 km^{2} (2.9 sq mi)

Population (2021)
  - Total: 199
  - Density: 26/km^{2} (68/sq mi)
- Time zone: UTC+1 (CET)
  - Summer (DST): UTC+2 (CEST)
- Postal code: 48327
- Area code: +385 (0)48

Molve Grede is a village in Croatia.
