= August Marić =

Yugoslav and Croatian soldier

- Born: 25 March 1885
- Died: 17 November 1957 (aged 72)
- Military career
- Allegiance: Austria-Hungary; Kingdom of Yugoslavia; Independent State of Croatia
- Rank: Austro-Hungarian Army - Staff Captain; Royal Yugoslav Army - Major General; Croatian Home Guard - Lieutenant General
- Commands: Chief of staff, Croatian Home Guard May–September 1941

August Marić (25 March 1885 – 17 November 1957) was a Yugoslav soldier who later served as senior member of the armed forces of the Independent State of Croatia during World War II. In the 1941 April War he commanded a division of the Royal Yugoslav Army. He was the first chief-of-staff of the Croatian Home Guard when it was created in May 1941, but was removed from his post and retired that September, probably because the Ustaše leadership did not trust him. He was succeeded as chief-of-staff by Vladimir Laxa. Together with minister Mladen Lorković, Marić signed the treaty establishing the border between the Independent State of Croatia and the German Reich.

He is buried in Mirogoj cemetery.
