= Domaji =

Coordinates: 46°08′N 16°45′E

- Village
- Interactive map of Domaji
- Country: Croatia
- County: Koprivnica-Križevci County

Area
  - Total: 8.1 km^{2} (3.1 sq mi)

Population (2021)
  - Total: 154
  - Density: 19/km^{2} (49/sq mi)
- Time zone: UTC+1 (CET)
  - Summer (DST): UTC+2 (CEST)

Domaji is a village in Croatia.
