= Peščenik, Slovenia =

Peščenik
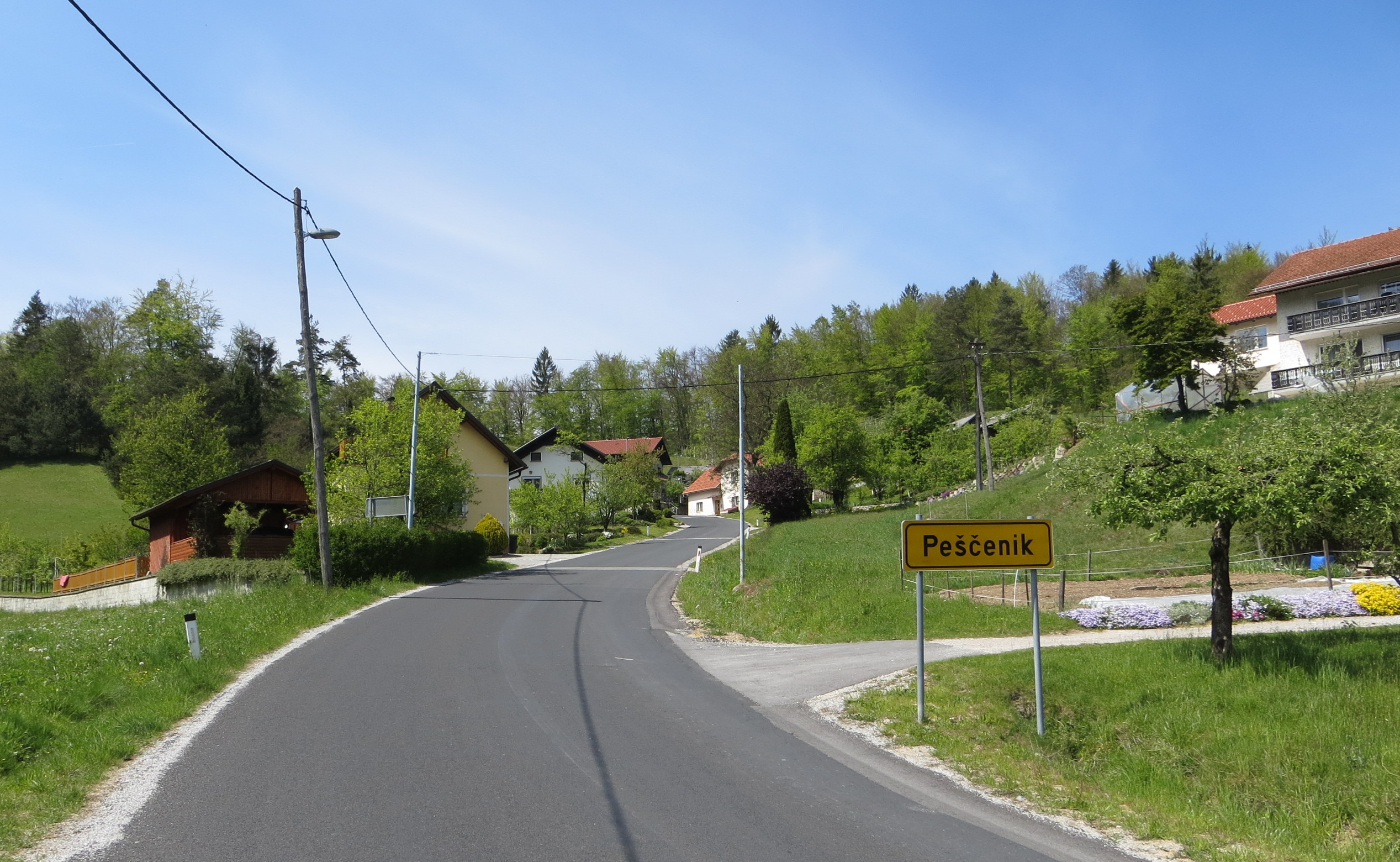

- Location in Slovenia
- Coordinates: 45°57′4.85″N 14°43′23.88″E
- Country: Slovenia
- Traditional region: Lower Carniola
- Statistical region: Central Slovenia
- Municipality: Ivančna Gorica

Area
  - Total: 0.69 km^{2} (0.27 sq mi)
- Elevation: 440.5 m (1,445 ft)

Population (2002)
  - Total: 67

Peščenik (pronounced [pɛˈʃtʃeːnik]; German: Sandberg) is a settlement southwest of Višnja Gora in the Municipality of Ivančna Gorica in central Slovenia. The area is part of the historical region of Lower Carniola. The municipality is now included in the Central Slovenia Statistical Region.
