= Reka, Koprivnica =

Reka
- Village
- Location within Croatia
- Coordinates: 46°08′N 16°46′E
- Country: Croatia
- County: Koprivnica-Križevci
- Municipality: Koprivnica

Area
  - Total: 16.7 km^{2} (6.4 sq mi)

Population (2021)
  - Total: 1,317
  - Density: 78.9/km^{2} (204/sq mi)
- Time zone: UTC+1 (CET)
  - Summer (DST): UTC+2 (CEST)

Reka is a village in Croatia. It is connected by the D41 highway.
