= Velika Mučna =

Coordinates: 46°07′N 16°45′E

- Village
- Interactive map of Velika Mučna
- Country: Croatia
- County: Koprivnica-Križevci County

Area
  - Total: 18.1 km^{2} (7.0 sq mi)

Population (2021)
  - Total: 293
  - Density: 16.2/km^{2} (41.9/sq mi)
- Time zone: UTC+1 (CET)
  - Summer (DST): UTC+2 (CEST)

Velika Mučna is a village in Croatia. It is connected by the D41 highway.
