= Old town Đurđevac =

Medieval fortress in Đurđevac, Croatia

Coordinates: 46.045°N 17.068°E

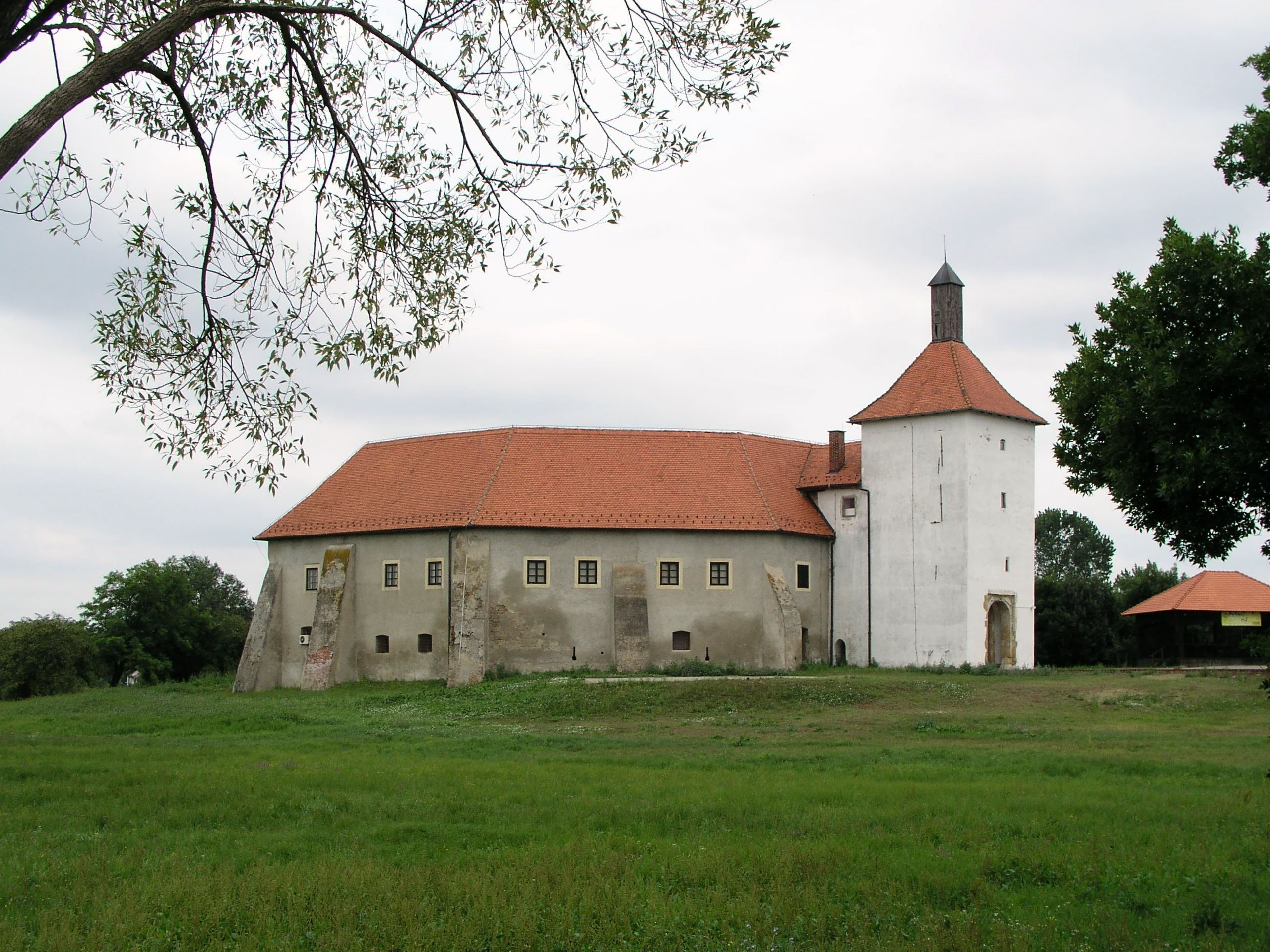
Old town Đurđevac in summer

Old town Đurđevac (Croatian: Stari grad Đurđevac [stâːriː ɡrâːd dʑûːrdʑeʋats]; Hungarian: Szentgyörgyvár) was built by the Bishop of Pécs, most probably around 1488. The town, or fort, was built on high ground in the middle of a swamp to the north of the town of Đurđevac in Croatia, because of the threat of the Turkish, and constant conflicts between the nobility. The height of the tower is around 30 feet (9 m).
