= Otočka =

Coordinates: 46°11′50″N 17°00′30″E

- Village
- Interactive map of Otočka
- Country: Croatia
- County: Koprivnica-Križevci County
- Municipality: Gola

Area
  - Total: 8.4 km^{2} (3.2 sq mi)

Population (2021)
  - Total: 214
  - Density: 25/km^{2} (66/sq mi)
- Time zone: UTC+1 (CET)
  - Summer (DST): UTC+2 (CEST)

Otočka is a village in Gola, Koprivnica-Križevci County in northeastern Croatia. Its population in 2011 was 238.
