= Ponjan =

Table game

Ponjan (ポンジャン), also known as Donjara, is a kids version of the table game mahjong played in Japan. Ponjan (also spelled Pom Jong in English) has three types of tiles: cars, boats and airplanes.Ponjan is a portmanteau of 'pon,' or 'pong,' the word for calling a triplet, and 'jan,' or 'jong,' the second syllable of the word mahjong. Donjara is the Bandai registered trademark version of this game, Donjara typically licenses franchises for specific licensed editions. Takara Tomy also produces licensed versions of Ponjan, notably of Pokemon and Mickey Mouse. The game is played with 2 to 4 players.

As of March 2021, Bandai Namco has sold 3.92 million units since 1984.

== Gameplay ==
=== Ponjan ===
Similar to Riichi Mahjong, players look to achieve a 'yaku,' or winning hand. In Ponjan, the basic yaku is 3 sets of 3 tiles, each set containing 3 of the same tile. Ponjan's starting hand is only 8 tiles as opposed to Riichi Mahjong's 13 tiles.

As the name implies, Ponjan differs from Mahjong in that a player cannot chii, or call a run from the adjacent player's discard pile, they can pon however. Ponjan also contains joker tiles, which can substitute for one of the tiles in a set.

The basic gameplay loop consists of drawing and discard a tile on one's own turn, or calling pon on another's turn and placing the set face up on the player's side of the table.

=== Donjara ===
Donjara's basic gameplay loop is identical to ponjan, however, it has much more focus on unique yaku. Donjara editions don't have a standardized number of tiles, suits, jokers or yaku, the average set containing 84 tiles with 3 honor tiles and 1 joker. Some licensed editions may not have numbered tiles either.

Yaku usually involve references to the franchise of the licensed edition, for example:

In Donjara Neo One Piece, suits are split into the factions: Straw Hat Pirates, Worst Generation Pirates, The Yonko, The Marines and The Revolutionary Army. The "Daishuuketsu Set" is any 9 tiles from a single suit. Some suits do not have enough pieces to achieve this yaku, so a special suitless Luffy tile acts as a joker, thematically representing his given titles as a member of the Worst Generation and "The Fifth Yonko."

In Donjara Neo Demon Slayer, there are 15 suits of 5, each suit being a character from the series. The "Friends of Rengoku Set" is a triplet of Kyoujurou Rengoku, and two triplets of either Kamado Tanjirou, Agatsuma Zenitsu or Hashibira Inosuke. This group represents the protagonists of the Mugen Train arc of the series.

== Digital editions ==
Ponjan had a digital edition of the Tomy version of the game released on DSiWare and WiiWare.There also exist several video game editions of Donjara, for example, Azumanga Donjara Daioh and Marl Jong for PSX. Gegege no Kitarou also has a donjara game for Super Famicom. Donjara appears as a minigame in a few other Bandai and Namco games, such as Tales of Fandom vol. 2.

== See also ==
- List of Japanese games
