= Herešin =

Coordinates: 46°11′N 16°52′E

- Village
- Interactive map of Herešin
- Country: Croatia
- County: Koprivnica-Križevci
- Municipality: Koprivnica

Area
  - Total: 0.77 sq mi (2.0 km^{2})

Population (2021)
  - Total: 682
  - Density: 880/sq mi (340/km^{2})
- Time zone: UTC+1 (CET)
  - Summer (DST): UTC+2 (CEST)

Herešin is a village in Croatia. It is connected by the D2 highway.
