= Grkine =

Coordinates: 46°04′30″N 17°04′30″E

- Village
- Interactive map of Grkine
- Country: Croatia
- County: Koprivnica-Križevci County

Area
  - Total: 8.1 km^{2} (3.1 sq mi)

Population (2021)
  - Total: 121
  - Density: 15/km^{2} (39/sq mi)
- Time zone: UTC+1 (CET)
  - Summer (DST): UTC+2 (CEST)

Grkine is a village in Croatia in the Đurđevac municipality.
