= Srijem, Koprivnica-Križevci County =

Srijem
- Village
- Interactive map of Srijem
- Location within Croatia
- Country: Croatia

Area
  - Total: 2.2 sq mi (5.8 km^{2})

Population (2021)
  - Total: 170
  - Density: 76/sq mi (29/km^{2})
- Time zone: UTC+1 (CET)
  - Summer (DST): UTC+2 (CEST)

Srijem is a village near Sokolovac, Koprivnica-Križevci County, Croatia.
