= Gola, Koprivnica-Križevci County =

Gola
- Interactive map of Gola
- Location within Croatia
- Country: Croatia
- County: Koprivnica-Križevci County

Government
  - Municipal Mayor: Stjepan Milinković (HDZ)

Area
  - Total: 75.9 km^{2} (29.3 sq mi)

Population (2021)
  - Total: 2,078
  - Density: 27.4/km^{2} (70.9/sq mi)
- Time zone: UTC+1 (CET)
  - Summer (DST): UTC+2 (CEST)
- Postal code: 48000 Koprivnica
- Website: gola.hr

Gola is a settlement and a municipality in the Koprivnica-Križevci County in Croatia. According to the 2021 census, the municipality had 2,078 inhabitants, with Croats forming an absolute majority at 99.81%.

== History ==
In the late 19th century and early 20th century, Gola was part of the Bjelovar-Križevci County of the Kingdom of Croatia-Slavonia. Gola had a railway station on the Barcs - Nagykanizsa railway line (opened in 1868) in Hungarian territory. The use of the station for Gola district citizens was possible and were ruled under a special Hungarian - Yugoslav agreement until World War II. After the Cold War started, the access through the border was prohibited. The last train stopped at Gola station on 18 June 1951 at 3:50 p.m. After 1956, the station building was demolished.

== Demographics ==
In 2021, the municipality had 2,078 residents in the following 5 settlements:

- Gola, population 779
- Gotalovo, population 281
- Novačka, population 343
- Otočka, population 214
- Ždala, population 461
Gola: Population trends 1857–2021
v

population	2394	2902	3813	5458	5789	6415	6280	6026	5592	5281	4719	4163	3609	3165	2760	2431	2078
	1857	1869	1880	1890	1900	1910	1921	1931	1948	1953	1961	1971	1981	1991	2001	2011	2021

Sources: Croatian Bureau of Statistics publications

=== Religion ===
Religion	Population	%
Catholics	2,009	96.68%
Other Christians	45	2.17%
Others	24	1.15%
Total	2,078	100%

== Administration ==
The current mayor of Gola is Stjepan Milinković (HDZ) and the Gola Municipal Council consists of 9 seats.

Groups	Councilors per group
Grouping of electors	5 / 9
HDZ	4 / 9
