= Molve =

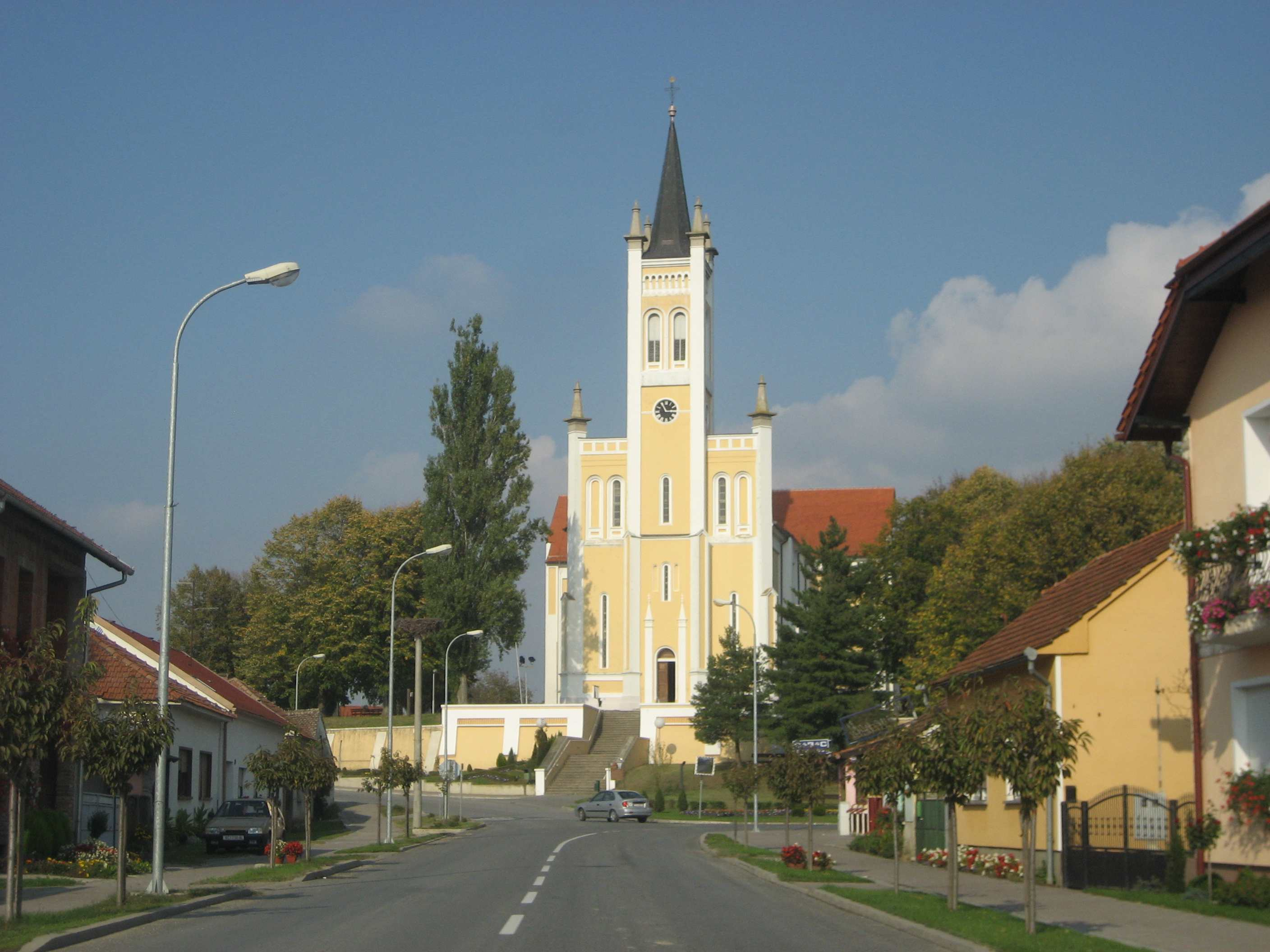
- Interactive map of Molve
- Location within Croatia
- Coordinates: 46°07′N 17°02′E
- Country: Croatia
- County: Koprivnica-Križevci County

Government
  - Mayor: Zdravko Ivančan (Independent)

Area
  - Total: 46.4 km^{2} (17.9 sq mi)

Population (2021)
  - Total: 1,767
  - Density: 38.1/km^{2} (98.6/sq mi)
- Time zone: UTC+1 (CET)
  - Summer (DST): UTC+2 (CEST)
- Postal code: 48350 Đurđevac
- Website: molve.hr

Molve is a village and a municipality in the Koprivnica–Križevci County in Croatia.

In the 2021 census, there were a total of 1,767 inhabitants.

== History ==
In the late 19th century and early 20th century, Molve was part of the Bjelovar-Križevci County of the Kingdom of Croatia-Slavonia.

== Demographics ==
In 2021, the municipality had 1,767 residents in the following settlements:

- Čingi-Lingi, population 19
- Molve, population 1,195
- Molve Grede, population 199
- Repaš, population 354
Molve: Population trends 1857–2021
v

population	2119	2490	2744	3220	3778	4097	3834	3739	3692	3569	3460	3243	2836	2487	2379	2189	1767
	1857	1869	1880	1890	1900	1910	1921	1931	1948	1953	1961	1971	1981	1991	2001	2011	2021

Sources: Croatian Bureau of Statistics publications

== Administration ==
The current mayor of Molve is Zdravko Ivančan (Free Voters Group) and the Molve Municipal Council consists of 9 seats.

Groups	Councilors per group
Free Voters Group	5 / 9
HDZ	4 / 9
