= Đurđevac =

- Town
- Selo Đurđevac; Village of Đurđevac
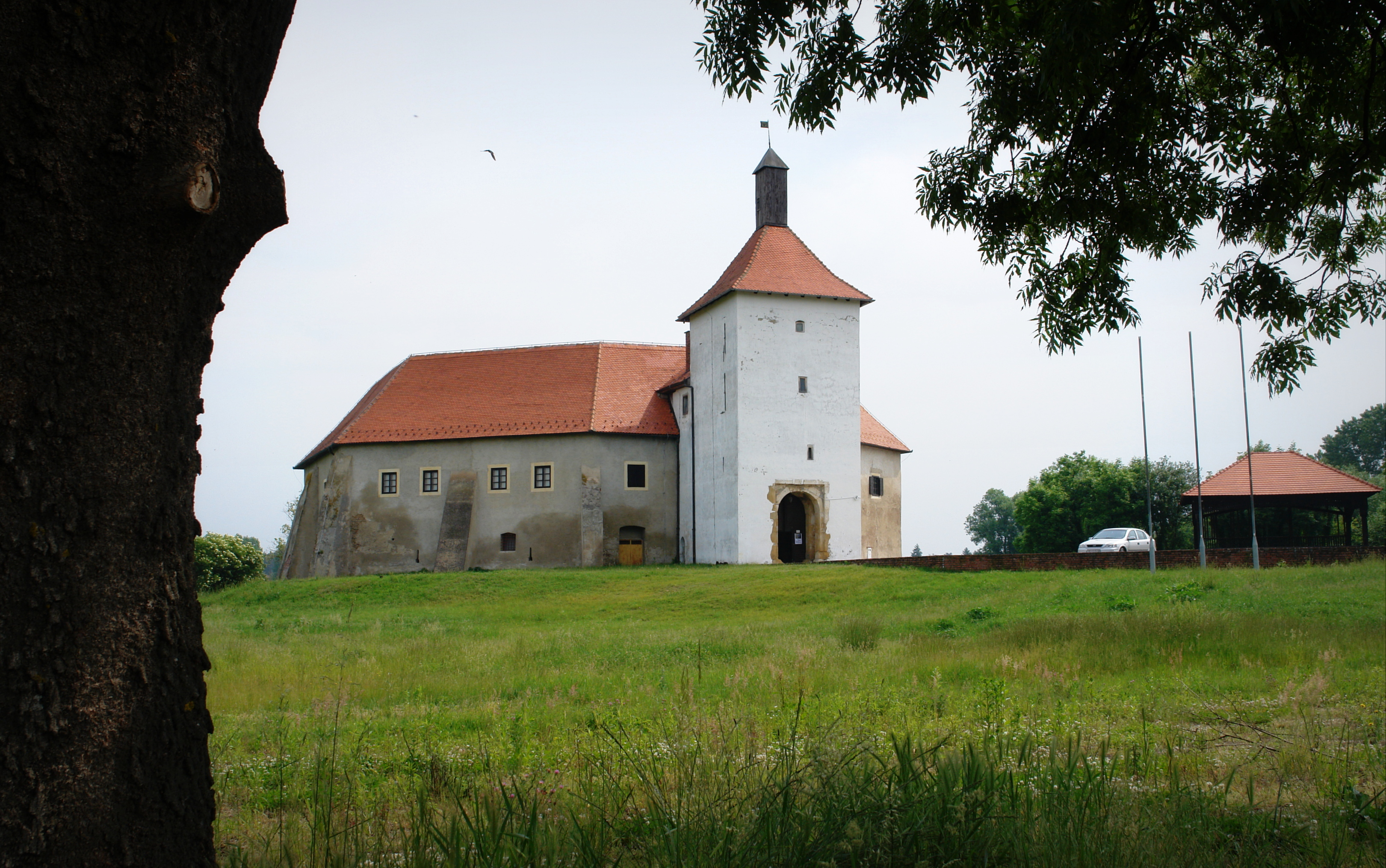
- Đurđevac Castle
- Interactive map of Đurđevac
- Location Đurđevac in Croatia
- Coordinates: 46.04°N 17.07°E
- Country: Croatia
- Region: Northern Croatia (Podravina)
- County: Koprivnica-Križevci County

Government
  - Mayor: Hrvoje Janči (Independent)

Area
  - Town: 157.8 km^{2} (60.9 sq mi)
  - Urban: 42.0 km^{2} (16.2 sq mi)

Population (2021)
  - Town: 7,378
  - Density: 46.76/km^{2} (121.1/sq mi)
  - Urban: 5,834
  - Urban density: 139/km^{2} (360/sq mi)
- Demonym(s): Đurđevčanin (male); Đurđevčanka (female)
- Time zone: UTC+1 (CET)
  - Summer (DST): UTC+2 (CEST)
- Postal code: 48350
- Area code: +385 (0)48
- Website: djurdjevac.hr

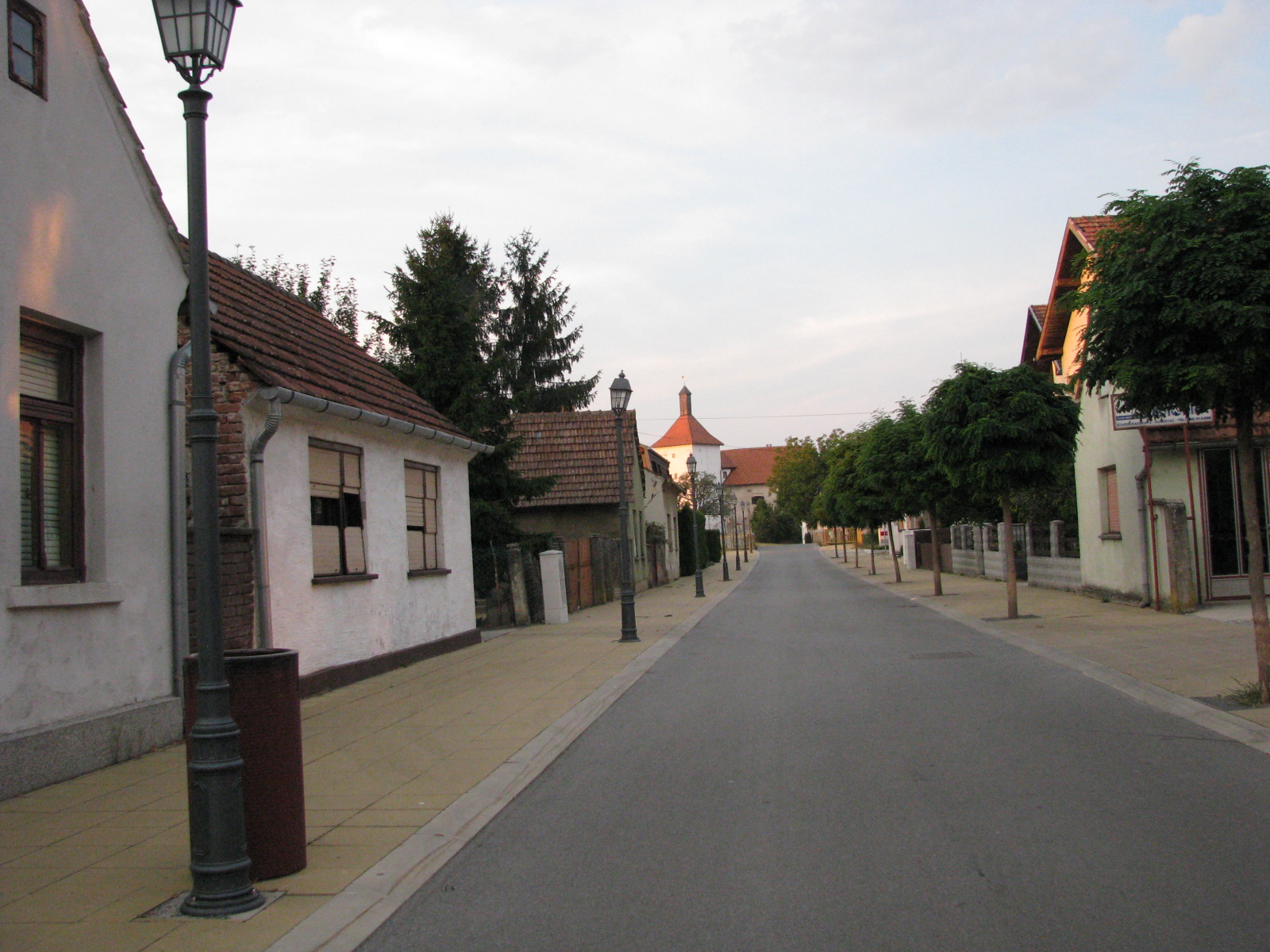
A street in Đurđevac

Đurđevac is a town in the Koprivnica-Križevci County in Croatia.

== History ==
Until 1918, Đurđevac (named Militär Sanct Georgen before 1850) was part of the Austrian monarchy (Kingdom of Croatia-Slavonia after the compromise of 1867), in the Croatian Military Frontier, under the WARASDIN-ST. GEORGENER Regiment N°VI. In the late 19th century and early 20th century, Đurđevac was a district capital in the Bjelovar-Križevci County of the Kingdom.

== Climate ==
Since records began in 1960, the highest temperature recorded at the local weather station was 38.6 °C (101.5 °F), on 10 August 2017. The coldest temperature was −28.3 °C (−18.9 °F), on 16 January 1963.

== Demographics ==
According to the 2021 census, there are a total of 7,378 inhabitants in the municipality, in the following settlements:

- Budrovac, population 277
- Čepelovac, population 302
- Đurđevac, population 5,834
- Grkine, population 121
- Mičetinac, population 146
- Severovci, population 92
- Sirova Katalena, population 226
- Suha Katalena, population 285
- Sveta Ana, population 95

In the census of 2021, Croats formed an absolute majority at 92.55%.

Town of Đurđevac: Population trends 1857–2021
v

population	7393	8709	9399	10268	11147	12106	11517	11356	10634	10372	10132	9679	9468	9430	8862	8264	7378
	1857	1869	1880	1890	1900	1910	1921	1931	1948	1953	1961	1971	1981	1991	2001	2011	2021

Sources: Croatian Bureau of Statistics publications

The citizens of the town colloquially call themselves "Picoki".

== Administration ==
The current mayor of Đurđevac is Hrvoje Janči and the Đurđevac Town Council consists of 13 seats.

Groups	Councilors per group
Independents	11 / 13
SDP	2 / 13

== Sights and events ==
- Old town Đurđevac
- Picokijada - Legenda o picokima
- Church of st. George in Đurđevac
- Sands of Đurđevac
- Park-Forest Đurđevac
- Seperacija, an artificial lake
- Čivićevac, the perennial river through the town

== Notable people ==
- Boris Braun - member of the notable Braun family, University professor and honorary Citizen of Đurđevac
- Mladen Markač - Commander of Croatian Special Police during Operation Storm during the Croatian War of Independence (1991–1995), and afterwards held the rank of Colonel General

== Twin city ==
- Gödöllő, Hungary
