= Novačka =

Coordinates: 46°10′N 17°03′E

- Village
- Interactive map of Novačka
- Country: Croatia
- County: Koprivnica-Križevci County
- Municipality: Gola

Area
  - Total: 17.7 km^{2} (6.8 sq mi)

Population (2021)
  - Total: 343
  - Density: 19.4/km^{2} (50.2/sq mi)
- Time zone: UTC+1 (CET)
  - Summer (DST): UTC+2 (CEST)

Novačka is a village in Gola, Koprivnica-Križevci County in northeastern Croatia. Its population in 2011 was 381.
