= Ždala =

- Village
- Location within Croatia
- Coordinates: 46°10′N 17°08′E
- Country: Croatia
- County: Koprivnica-Križevci County
- Municipality: Gola

Area
  - Total: 32.5 km^{2} (12.5 sq mi)

Population (2021)
  - Total: 461
  - Density: 14.2/km^{2} (36.7/sq mi)
- Time zone: UTC+1 (CET)
  - Summer (DST): UTC+2 (CEST)
- Postal code: 48332

Ždala is a village in Croatia. It is connected by the D210 highway to Gola. Its population in 2011 was 583.

Located on the Hungarian border almost all residents speak a dialect of the Hungarian language, although they declare themselves Croats.

Ždala has a kindergarten and an elementary school. The Roman Catholic parish church is dedicated to Holy Trinity.
