= Mali Grabičani =

Coordinates: 46°06′10″N 16°41′00″E

- Village
- Interactive map of Mali Grabičani
- Country: Croatia
- County: Koprivnica-Križevci County
- Municipality: Sokolovac

Area
  - Total: 2.3 km^{2} (0.89 sq mi)

Population (2021)
  - Total: 125
  - Density: 54/km^{2} (140/sq mi)
- Time zone: UTC+1 (CET)
  - Summer (DST): UTC+2 (CEST)

Mali Grabičani is a village in Croatia.
