= Sokolovac, Koprivnica-Križevci County =

Sokolovac
- Interactive map of Sokolovac
- Location within Croatia
- Coordinates: 46°06′39″N 16°42′23″E
- Country: Croatia
- County: Koprivnica-Križevci County

Government
  - Mayor: Vlado Bakšaj (HDZ)

Area
  - Total: 135.9 km^{2} (52.5 sq mi)

Population (2021)
  - Total: 2,789
  - Density: 20.52/km^{2} (53.15/sq mi)
- Time zone: UTC+1 (CET)
  - Summer (DST): UTC+2 (CEST)
- Postal code: 48000 Koprivnica
- Website: sokolovac.hr

Sokolovac is a village and municipality in the Koprivnica–Križevci County in Croatia.

In the 2021 census, there were 2,789 inhabitants. Croats were a majority, at 85.84%, followed by Serbs at 11.19%.

== History ==
In the late 19th century and early 20th century, Sokolovac was part of the Bjelovar-Križevci County of the Kingdom of Croatia-Slavonia. The Serbian Orthodox Lepavina Monastery, established in 1550, is located within the boundaries of the municipality.

== Demographics ==
In 2021, the municipality had 2,789 residents in the following 32 settlements:

- Brđani Sokolovački, population 49
- Domaji, population 154
- Donja Velika, population 83
- Donjara, population 16
- Donji Maslarac, population 63
- Gornja Velika, population 75
- Gornji Maslarac, population 29
- Grdak, population 70
- Hudovljani, population 114
- Jankovac, population 38
- Kamenica, population 9
- Ladislav Sokolovački, population 100
- Lepavina, population 133
- Mala Branjska, population 51
- Mala Mučna, population 62
- Mali Botinovac, population 9
- Mali Grabičani, population 125
- Mali Poganac, population 131
- Miličani, population 112
- Paunovac, population 21
- Peščenik, population 72
- Prnjavor Lepavinski, population 49
- Rijeka Koprivnička, population 51
- Rovištanci, population 48
- Sokolovac, population 381
- Srijem, population 170
- Široko Selo, population 33
- Trnovac Sokolovački, population 89
- Velika Branjska, population 25
- Velika Mučna, population 293
- Veliki Botinovac, population 70
- Vrhovac Sokolovački, population 64
Sokolovac: Population trends 1857–2021
v

population	3266	3437	4215	4661	5004	5485	5445	6360	6214	6416	6715	5751	5013	4366	3964	3417	2789
	1857	1869	1880	1890	1900	1910	1921	1931	1948	1953	1961	1971	1981	1991	2001	2011	2021

Sources: Croatian Bureau of Statistics publications

== Administration ==
The current mayor of Sokolovac is Vlado Bakšaj (HDZ) and the Sokolovac Municipal Council consists of 13 seats.

Groups	Councilors per group
HDZ	7 / 13
Free Voters Group	5 / 13
SDP	1 / 13
