= Gotalovo =

Coordinates: 46°13′N 16°59′E

- Village
- Interactive map of Gotalovo
- Country: Croatia
- County: Koprivnica-Križevci County
- Municipality: Gola

Area
  - Total: 3.4 sq mi (8.9 km^{2})

Population (2021)
  - Total: 281
  - Density: 82/sq mi (32/km^{2})
- Time zone: UTC+1 (CET)
  - Summer (DST): UTC+2 (CEST)

Gotalovo is a village in Gola municipality, Koprivnica-Križevci County, in northeastern Croatia. Its population in 2011 was 344.
