= Repaš =

Coordinates: 46°09′N 17°04′E

- Village
- Interactive map of Repaš
- Country: Croatia
- County: Koprivnica-Križevci County

Area
  - Total: 12.5 km^{2} (4.8 sq mi)

Population (2021)
  - Total: 354
  - Density: 28.3/km^{2} (73.3/sq mi)
- Time zone: UTC+1 (CET)
  - Summer (DST): UTC+2 (CEST)

Repaš (Hungarian: Répás) is a village in Croatia.
