= 7th Army (Kingdom of Yugoslavia) =

WWII Royal Yugoslav Army formation

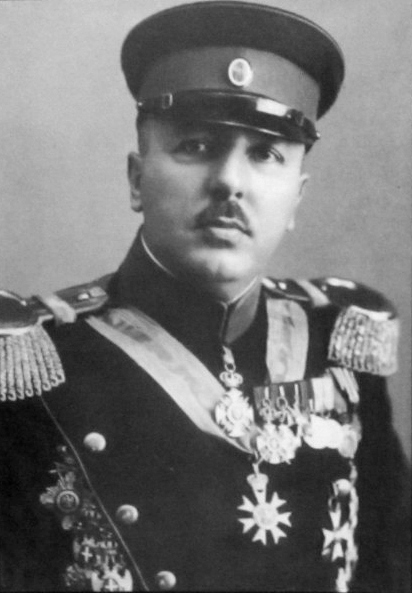
- Divizijski đeneral Dušan Trifunović commanded the Yugoslav 7th Army during the Axis invasion of Yugoslavia
- Active: 1941
- Disbanded: 1941
- Country: Kingdom of Yugoslavia
- Branch: Royal Yugoslav Army
- Type: Infantry
- Size: Corps (Note: The Royal Yugoslav Army did not field corps, but their armies consisted of several divisions, and were therefore corps-sized.)
- Part of: 1st Army Group
- Engagements: Invasion of Yugoslavia

Commanders
- Notable commanders: Dušan Trifunović

The 7th Army was a Royal Yugoslav Army formation raised prior to the German-led Axis invasion of Yugoslavia in April 1941, during World War II. It consisted of two divisions, two brigade-strength mountain detachments, and a brigade-strength infantry detachment. It formed part of the 1st Army Group, and was responsible for the defence of Yugoslavia's north-western frontier with Italy and Germany. Like all Yugoslav formations at the time, the 7th Army had serious deficiencies in both mobility and firepower.

Despite concerns over a possible Axis invasion, orders for the general mobilisation of the Royal Yugoslav Army were not issued by the government until 3 April 1941, not to provoke Germany any further following the military coup d'état and precipitate war. When the invasion commenced on 6 April, the 7th Army was only partially mobilised, and on the first day the Germans seized several mountain passes and bridges over the Drava river. Slovene politicians formed a National Council of Slovenia with the intent of separating from Yugoslavia, and on the right flank of the 7th Army, the 4th Army was seriously weakened by Croat fifth column activities within its major units and higher headquarters from the outset. This alarmed the 7th Army commander, Divizijski đeneral Dušan Trifunović, but he was not permitted to withdraw from the border areas until the night of 7/8 April, and this was followed by the German capture of Maribor on 8 April as they continued to expand their bridgeheads, supported by the Luftwaffe.

On 10 April, the German 14th Panzer Division captured Zagreb. Italian offensive operations began the following day, with thrusts towards Ljubljana and down the Adriatic coast that resulted in the capture of more than 30,000 Yugoslav troops near Delnice. When fifth column supporters of the Croatian nationalist Ustaše movement arrested the headquarters staff of the 7th Army later that day, the formation effectively ceased to exist. On 12 April, the 14th Panzer Division linked up with the Italians near the Adriatic coast, encircling the remnants of the 7th Army, which offered no further resistance. Ceasefires were implemented from 15 April, and the Yugoslav Supreme Command surrendered unconditionally effective on 18 April.

== Background ==
A map showing the location of Yugoslavia in Europe

The Kingdom of Serbs, Croats and Slovenes was created with the merger of Serbia, Montenegro and the South Slav-inhabited areas of Austria-Hungary on 1 December 1918, in the immediate aftermath of World War I. The Army of the Kingdom of Serbs, Croats and Slovenes was established to defend the new state. It was formed around the nucleus of the victorious Royal Serbian Army, as well as armed formations raised in regions formerly controlled by Austria-Hungary. Many former Austro-Hungarian officers and soldiers became members of the new army. From the beginning, much like other aspects of public life in the new kingdom, the army was dominated by ethnic Serbs, who saw it as a means by which to secure Serb political hegemony.

The army's development was hampered by the kingdom's poor economy, and this continued during the 1920s. In 1929, King Alexander changed the name of the country to the Kingdom of Yugoslavia, at which time the army was renamed the Royal Yugoslav Army (Serbo-Croatian Latin: Vojska Kraljevine Jugoslavije, VKJ). The army budget remained tight, and as tensions rose across Europe during the 1930s, it became difficult to secure weapons and munitions from other countries. Consequently, at the time World War II broke out in September 1939, the VKJ had several serious weaknesses, which included reliance on draught animals for transport, and the large size of its formations. Infantry divisions had a wartime strength of 26,000–27,000 men, as compared to contemporary British infantry divisions of half that strength. These characteristics resulted in slow, unwieldy formations, and the inadequate supply of arms and munitions meant that even the very large Yugoslav formations had low firepower. Generals better suited to the trench warfare of World War I were combined with an army that was neither equipped nor trained to resist the fast-moving combined arms approach used by the Germans in their invasions of Poland and France.

The weaknesses of the VKJ in strategy, structure, equipment, mobility and supply were exacerbated by serious ethnic disunity within Yugoslavia, resulting from two decades of Serb hegemony and the attendant lack of political legitimacy achieved by the central government. Attempts to address the disunity came too late to ensure that the VKJ was a cohesive force. Fifth column activity was also a serious concern, not only from the Croatian fascist Ustaše and the ethnic German minorities but also potentially from the pro-Bulgarian Macedonians and the Albanian population of Kosovo.

== Formation ==
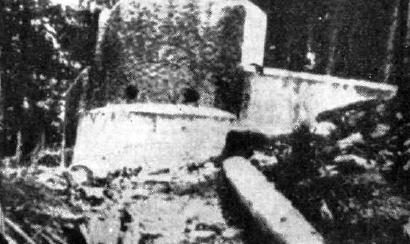
An example of a bunker built on Mount Blegoš by the Yugoslav Army prior to the invasion of Yugoslavia

Yugoslav war plans foresaw the headquarters of the 7th Army and its army-level supporting units being created at the time of mobilisation. Unlike the other six Yugoslav armies, the 7th Army did not have a corresponding army district during peacetime, and would be allocated divisions when it was formed. Zagreb, Karlovac, Trebnje and Velike Lašče were key centres for the mobilisation and concentration of the 7th Army due to their good rail infrastructure.

Prior to the invasion, significant fortifications known as the Rupnik Line were constructed along the Italian and German borders, within what became the 7th Army's area of operations. Along the frontier with Italy, mutually supporting bunkers were established on forward slopes of the mountain ranges behind a belt of obstacles. The main positions followed a line from Mount Blegoš south-south-east through Hlavče Njive, Žirovski Vrh, Vrh Svetih Treh Kraljev, Zaplana, Mount Slivnica, Grahovo, and Lož to Petičak. To the north of Mount Blegoš, positions ran behind the lines of the Selška Sora and Sava Bohinjka rivers. Fortifications were also established in the mountainous Gorski kotar region between Karlovac and Fiume on the upper Adriatic coast. Along the German border, the Yugoslavs concentrated on preparing to block the passes through the Karawank and Kamnik Alps, and built bunkers behind obstacles along the routes leading south from the border towards Dravograd, Maribor and Ptuj. Preparations were also made to block routes north of the Drava and along the southern banks of the Mura and Drava. These fortifications were to be manned by border guard units, and were not the responsibility of the 7th Army.

== Composition ==
The 7th Army was commanded by Divizijski đeneral (Note: Equivalent to a U.S. Army major general.) Dušan Trifunović, and his chief of staff was Pukovnik (Note: Equivalent to a U.S. Army colonel.) Vladimir Petrović. The 7th Army consisted of:

- 32nd Infantry Division Triglavski
- 38th Infantry Division Dravska
- Mountain Detachment Triglavski (brigade-strength)
- Mountain Detachment Rišnajaski (brigade-strength)
- Detachment Lika (infantry, brigade-strength)

Army-level support was provided by the 71st Army Artillery Regiment, the 7th Anti-Aircraft Battalion, and the motorised 7th Army Anti-Aircraft Company. The 6th Air Reconnaissance Group comprising sixteen Breguet 19s was attached from the Royal Yugoslav Army Air Force (Serbo-Croatian Latin: Vazduhoplovstvo vojske Kraljevine Jugoslavije, VVKJ) and was based at Cerklje and Brege near Brežice.

== Deployment plan ==
Planned deployment locations for formations of the 7th Army
- Army headquarters in blue
- subordinate formations in red

The 7th Army was part of the 1st Army Group, which was responsible for the defence of north and north-western Yugoslavia, with the 7th Army along the Italian and German borders, and the 4th Army defending the eastern sector along the Hungarian border. The 1st Cavalry Division was to be held as the 1st Army Group reserve around Zagreb. On the left of the 7th Army was the Adriatic coast at Karlobag, and the boundary with the 4th Army on the right flank ran from Gornja Radgona on the Mura through Krapina and Karlovac to Otočac. The Yugoslav defence plan saw the 7th Army deployed in a cordon along the border region from the Adriatic in the west to Gornja Radgona in the east. Of the formations of the 7th Army, the mobilisation of the three detachments was largely complete, but the two divisions had only commenced mobilisation. All 7th Army formations were to be deployed in a cordon, although each formation was to create a second line of defence from its own troops. The headquarters of the 7th Army was to initially be located in Brežice. The planned deployment of the 7th Army from west to east was:

- Detachment Lika on the upper Adriatic coast from Karlobag through Otočac to Ogulin
- Mountain Detachment Rišnajaski (MD Rišnajaski) around Delnice in the mountainous Gorski kotar region, with responsibility for the defence of the Italian border from Sušak on the upper Adriatic coast to Mount Bička
- 32nd Infantry Division Triglavski (32nd ID) southwest of Ljubljana in the Julian Alps, allocated the western border with Italy from Mount Bička north to Mount Blegoš
- Mountain Detachment Triglavski (MD Triglavski) north-west of Ljubljana around Kranj, tasked to defend the Italian border from Mount Blegoš to the triple border, then the German border east into the Savinja Alps
- 38th Infantry Division Dravska (38th ID) in the Pohorje mountains around Maribor, responsible for the frontier from the Savinja Alps in the west to Radgon in the east, including the roads running south through Ptuj, Maribor and Dravograd, with its main positions on the southern bank of the Dravinja

Army-level and rear area troops were to be deployed in the area of Brežice, Zidani Most and Novo Mesto. Border guard units were to man fortifications along the Italian and German frontiers in the 7th Army area of responsibility, and consisted of:

- the 554th and 555th Independent Battalions, in the sector of Detachment Lika
- the 1st Border Regiment and an independent border battalion, supported by one border artillery battalion fielding three batteries, in the sector of Mountain Detachment Rišnajaski
- the 2nd and 3rd Border Regiments supported by two border artillery battalions fielding eight batteries, in the sector of the 32nd Infantry Division Triglavski
- the 4th and 5th Border Regiments supported by one border artillery battalion fielding three batteries, in the sector of Mountain Detachment Triglavski
- the 6th, 7th and 8th Border Regiments supported by three border artillery battalions fielding a total of eight batteries, in the sector of the 38th Infantry Division Dravska

== Mobilisation ==
After unrelenting pressure from Adolf Hitler, Yugoslavia signed the Tripartite Pact on 25 March 1941. On 27 March, a military coup d'état overthrew the government that had signed the pact, and a new government was formed under the VVKJ commander, Armijski đeneral (Note: Equivalent to a U.S. Army lieutenant general.) Dušan Simović. A general mobilisation was not called by the new government until 3 April, out of fear of offending Hitler and thus precipitating war. On the same day as the coup, Hitler issued Führer Directive 25 which called for Yugoslavia to be treated as a hostile state, and on 3 April, Führer Directive 26 was issued, detailing the plan of attack and command structure for the invasion, which was to commence on 6 April.

According to a post-war U.S. Army study, by the time the invasion began, the three brigade-sized detachments had mobilised, but the 32nd Infantry Division Triglavski and 38th Infantry Division Dravska had only commenced mobilising. The Yugoslav historian Velimir Terzić describes the mobilisation of the 7th Army as a whole on 6 April as "only partial", and states the headquarters of the 7th Army was mobilising in the Zagreb region.

=== Detachment Lika ===
Detachment Lika was an ad hoc formation consisting of the 44th Infantry Regiment and one battery of the 17th Artillery Regiment. On 6 April, it was concentrating in the Otočac region, but the poor response of personnel of the 44th Infantry Regiment to the mobilisation orders meant that it was only at 35–40 percent of its strength.

=== Mountain Detachment Rišnajaski ===
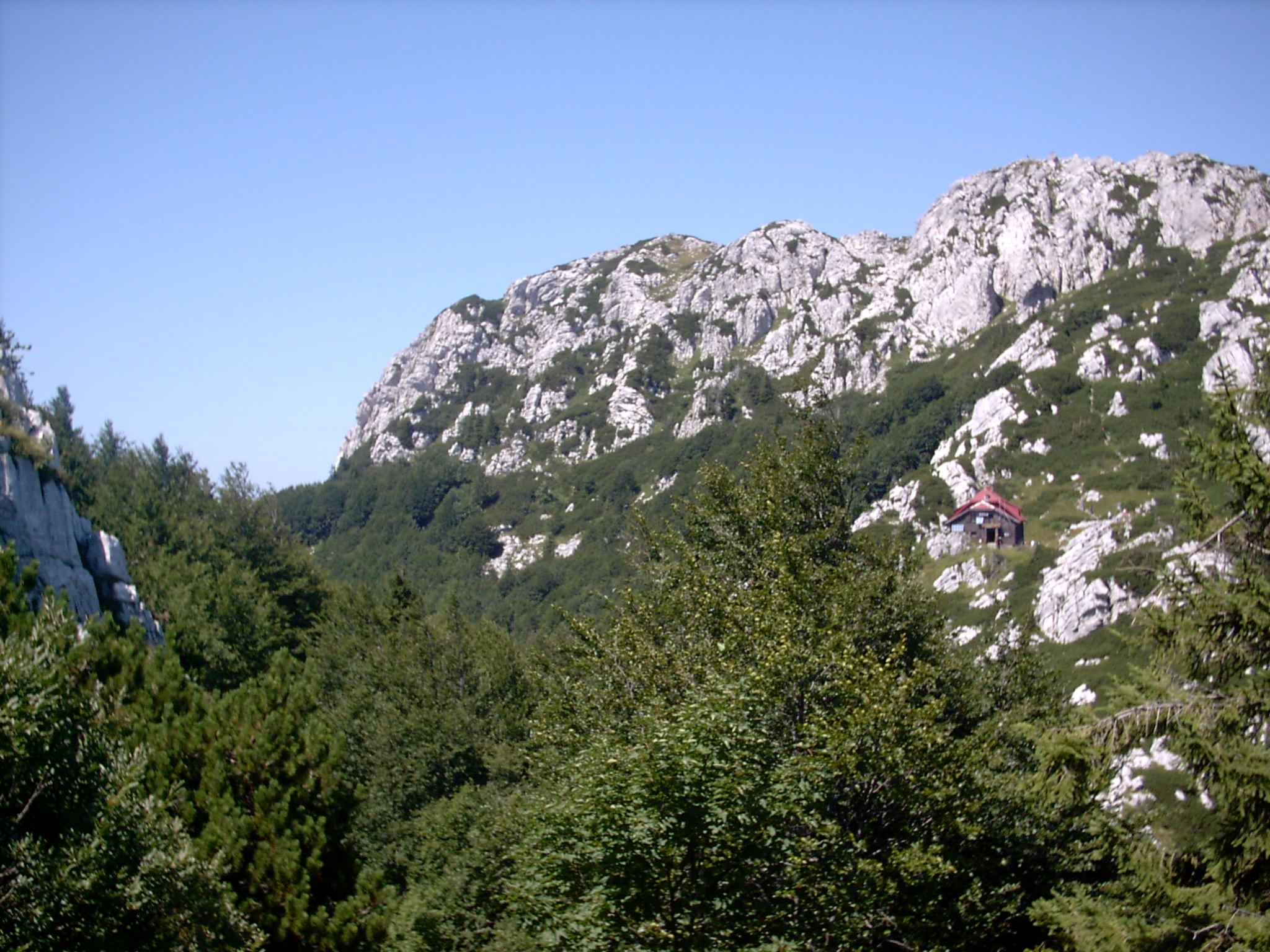
Mountain Detachment Rišnjaski was deployed in the mountainous Gorski kotar region north of Delnice.

Mountain Detachment Rišnajaski was commanded by Pukovnik Stojadin Milenković. On 6 April, the detachment, consisting of a headquarters, the 2nd Mountain Regiment of three battalions, the 5th Mountain Artillery Battery and supporting units, was deployed between various towns and villages in the areas of Čabar, Delnice, Gornje Jelenje, Kamenjak and Lokve, as follows:

- the 11th Mountain Battalion, with about 90 percent of its troops, in forward positions near the village of Klana
- the 13th Mountain Battalion, with about 90 percent of its strength, in depth, between the villages of Kamenjak and Gornje Jelenje
- the 12th Mountain Battalion, with about 96 percent of its planned strength, in reserve in Delnice
- the 5th Mountain Artillery Battery, deployed in the villages of Gerovo, Mrzle Vodica and Lokve
- an engineer company near Lokve

=== 32nd Infantry Division Triglavski ===
A significant part of the 32nd Infantry Division Triglavski was moving from its mobilisation areas to its concentration areas, while some elements were still mobilising. On 6 April, the division was located as follows:

- the divisional commander Divizijski đeneral Dragiša Pandurović and his staff were mobilising in Ljubljana, and arrived in their concentration area at Grosuplje, just south of Ljubljana around noon on 6 April
- the 32nd Divisional Infantry Regiment was moving from Celje to Ljubljana
- the 39th Infantry Regiment was marching from Celje to Lepoglava to join Detachment Ormozki of the 4th Army, and had reached Logatec
- the 40th Infantry Regiment, with about 80 percent of its troops and 50 percent of its vehicles and animals, was located at its mobilisation centre in Ljubljana
- the 110th Infantry Regiment, with about 60 percent of its troops and 50 percent of its animals, was on the move from Celje to Zagreb, where it was to join the 1st Army Group reserve, and had reached Zidani Most
- the 32nd Artillery Regiment was marching from Ljubljana to Grosuplje
- the 37th Infantry Regiment was moving from its mobilisation centres to divisional reserve positions around Ribnica, Sodražica, Bloke, Lašče and Novo Mesto
- other divisional units were mobilising in Ribnica, Ljubljana and Celje

=== Mountain Detachment Triglavski ===
Mountain Detachment Triglavski was commanded by Brigadni đeneral (Note: Equivalent to a U.S. Army brigadier general.) Mihailo Lukić. It consisted of the 1st Mountain Infantry Regiment of three battalions, supported by one battery of mountain artillery and other units. About 80 percent of the formation had answered the mobilisation order, and it was deployed in the vicinity of the towns of Jezersko, Tržič, Radovljica, Škofja Loka and Kranj.

=== 38th Infantry Division Dravska ===
The 38th Infantry Division Dravska had only commenced mobilisation, and was largely in its mobilisation centres or moving to concentration areas. On 6 April, the elements of the division were located as follows:

- the divisional commander Divizijski đeneral Čedomir Stanojlović and his headquarters staff were mobilising in Slovenska Bistrica
- the 38th Divisional Infantry and 45th Infantry Regiments were mobilising around Maribor
- the 112th Infantry Regiment (less its 1st Battalion) was marching north towards Slovenj Gradec from Slovenska Bistrica. The 1st Battalion of the 112th Infantry Regiment had already deployed near Dravograd, supporting the 6th Border Regiment
- the 128th Infantry Regiment was concentrating near Ptuj
- the 38th Artillery Regiment (less one battery) was near Ptuj, while one battery was marching from Maribor to its planned position at Slovenj Gradec
- the divisional machine-gun battalion, which had only 50 percent of its establishment of men and animals, was marching from Maribor to Ptuj
- the remainder of the divisional units were mobilising in Slovenska Bistrica, Maribor, Ptuj and Ljubljana

=== Overall condition of the 7th Army ===
At the time of the invasion, both mountain detachments had completed mobilisation and concentration, and were in position. Detachment Lika was at its mobilisation centre, but the turn-out of men for its infantry component was low. The 38th Infantry Division Dravska was completing its concentration. A large proportion of the 32nd Infantry Division Triglavski was moving from its mobilisation centres to its concentration areas. Across the 7th Army, around 80 percent of troops had answered the mobilisation order, but only 45 to 50 percent of vehicles and animals were available.

== Operations ==
=== 5–6 April ===
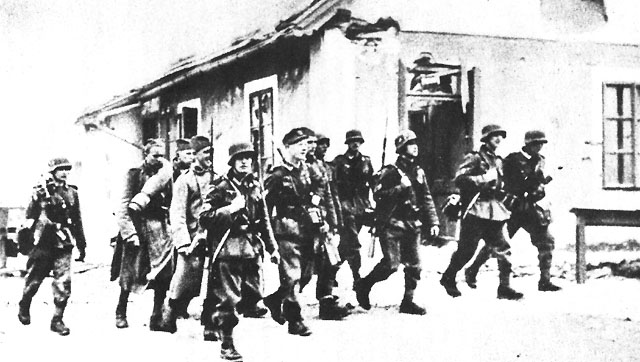
A German patrol returning from a cross-border raid, April 1941

The border between Italy, Germany and Yugoslavia was largely unsuitable for motorised operations due to the mountainous terrain. Due to the short notice of the invasion, the elements of the invading German 2nd Army that would make up LI Infantry Corps and XXXXIX Mountain Corps had to be transported from Germany, German-occupied France and the Nazi puppet Slovak Republic, and nearly all encountered difficulties in reaching their assembly areas in time. In the interim, the Germans formed a special force under the code name Feuerzauber (Magic Fire). This force was initially intended to merely reinforce the 538th Frontier Guard Division, who were manning the border. On the evening of 5 April, a particularly aggressive Feuerzauber detachment commander, Hauptmann Palten, led his Kampfgruppe Palten across the Mura from Spielfeld and, having secured the bridge, began attacking bunkers and other Yugoslav positions on the high ground, and sent patrols deep into the Yugoslav border fortification system. Due to a lack of Yugoslav counter-attacks, many of these positions remained in German hands into 6 April.

On the morning of 6 April, German aircraft conducted surprise attacks on Yugoslav airfields in the 7th Army area, including Ljubljana and Cerklje, where the 6th Air Reconnaissance Group was based. At 07:00, Messerschmitt Bf 109E fighters of Jagdgeschwader 27 strafed Ljubljana airfield, attacking hangars and some Potez 25 biplanes.

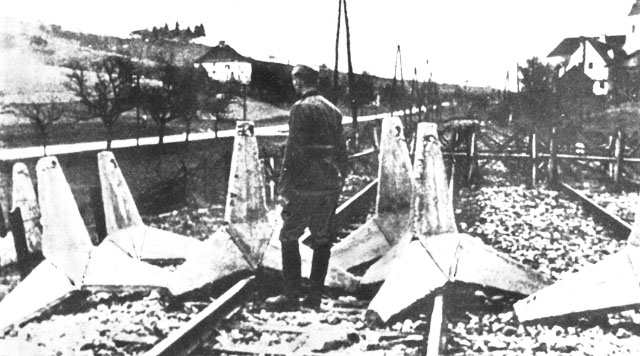
Yugoslav obstacles placed across railway tracks near Spielfeld on the Yugoslav–German border

LI Infantry Corps, commanded by General der Infanterie (Note: Equivalent to a U.S. Army lieutenant general.) Hans-Wolfgang Reinhard, were tasked with attacking towards Maribor then driving towards Zagreb, while the XXXXIX Mountain Corps, under General der Infanterie Ludwig Kübler, was to capture Dravograd then force a crossing on the Sava. At 05:00 on 6 April, LI Infantry Corps captured the Mura bridges at Mureck and Radkersburg (opposite Gornja Radgona) undamaged. In the sector of the 38th Infantry Division Dravska, one German column pushed towards Maribor from Mureck, and the other pushed on from Gornja Radgona through Lenart towards Ptuj. Some time later, other elements of LI Infantry Corps attacked the area between Sveti Duh and Dravograd. The 7th and 8th Border Regiments met these attacks with fierce resistance, but were forced to withdraw due to German pressure. The 183rd Infantry Division, under Generalmajor (Note: Equivalent to a U.S. Army brigadier general.) Benignus Dippold, captured 300 prisoners, and a bicycle-mounted detachment of the division reached Murska Sobota without striking any resistance. The 132nd Infantry Division, commanded by Generalmajor Rudolf Sintzenich, also pushed south along the Sejanski valley towards Savci. By the end of the first day, LI Infantry Corps had occupied Gornja Radgona, Murska Sobota and Radenci, and had crossed the Drava near Sveti Duh. XXXXIX Mountain Corps captured border crossings on the approaches to Dravograd, but were held up by the 6th Border Regiment in mountain passes located further west at Ljubelj, Jezerski vrh and Korensko sedlo. Late that day, mountain pioneers destroyed some isolated Yugoslav bunkers in the area penetrated by Kampfgruppe Palten.

German gains on 6 April (shown in red). Dravograd is to the west, Maribor to the east.

Later that day, German Junkers Ju 87 Stuka dive bombers of Sturzkampfgeschwader 77, escorted by Messerschmitt Bf 109E fighters, caught the Breguet 19s of the 6th Air Reconnaissance Group on the ground at Cerklje and Brege, destroying most of them. This was followed by attacks by the Italian Air Force on Yugoslav troop concentrations of the 7th Army. The Yugoslav Air Force was unable to interdict the Axis air attacks because the Hawker Hurricanes and Ikarus IK-2 aircraft of its 4th Fighter Regiment were based 240 kilometres (150 mi) away at Bosanski Aleksandrovac. After having been grounded for most of the day by poor weather, in the afternoon Bristol Blenheim Mk I light bombers of the Yugoslav 68th Bomber Group flew missions against airfields and railway stations across the German frontier at Graz, Fürstenfeld, Steyr and Wiener Neustadt.

By the close of the first day, the 7th Army was still largely mobilising and concentrating, and fifth column actions meant that nearly all the fighting was conducted by border troops. The 38th Infantry Division Dravska was deployed along the southern bank of the Drava, with the 128th Infantry Regiment and an artillery battalion around Ptuj, the 45th Infantry Regiment and an artillery battalion around Maribor and the 112th Infantry Regiment and an artillery battalion were at Slovenj Gradec and marching east towards Dravograd. German and Italian air attacks interfered with the deployment of troops and command was hampered by reliance on civilian telegraph and telephone services.

On that day, Marko Natlačen—the governor of the Drava Banovina—met with representatives of the major Slovene political parties, and created the National Council of Slovenia (Slovene: Narodni svet za Slovenijo, NszS), whose aim was to establish a Slovenia independent of Yugoslavia. When he heard the news of fifth-column-led revolts within the 4th Army, Trifunović was alarmed, and proposed withdrawal from the border areas, but this was rejected by the commander of the 1st Army Group, Armijski đeneral Milorad Petrović. The front along the border with Italy was relatively quiet, with some patrol clashes occurring, some sporadic artillery bombardments of border fortifications, and an unsuccessful raid by the Italians directed at Mount Blegoš.

=== 7 April ===
In the early hours of 7 April, three Blenheims of the Yugoslav 8th Bomber Regiment took off from Rovine to bomb the railway junction at Feldbach, but became disoriented in bad weather. Only one aircraft found a target in Austria, bombing a bridge and road near Steyr before continuing on to Wiener Neustadt where it was hit by anti-aircraft fire and made an emergency landing.

Over the period 7–9 April, LI Infantry Corps held the lead elements of its two divisions back to some extent while the rest of each division de-trained in Graz and made their way to the border. German forces along the front of the 7th Army continued to push towards Ptuj, Maribor and Dravograd on 7 April, against significant resistance from the 6th, 7th and 8th Border Regiments. The German thrusts towards Ptuj and Maribor broke through the Yugoslav defensive line Pesnica–Lenart–Sveta Trojica v Slovenskih Goricah–Kapelski Vrh, but those advancing towards Dravograd were held up by the 6th Border Regiment and a battalion of the 38th Infantry Division Dravska. Along the Italian border there were only skirmishes caused by Italian reconnaissance-in-force to a depth of 3 km (1.9 mi).

The Yugoslav Supreme Command ordered Petrović to use Mountain Detachment Rišnajaski to capture Fiume, across the Rječina river from Sušak, but the order was soon rescinded due to the deteriorating situation in the flanking 4th Army. In the afternoon of 7 April, Trifunović again pressed Petrović to order a withdrawal from the border. Petrović accepted that this might become necessary if the situation on the immediate right flank of the 7th Army deteriorated further, but the idea was opposed by the chief of staff of the headquarters of the 1st Army Group, Armijski đeneral Leon Rupnik, who suggested that Trifunović should personally lead night attacks to push the Germans back. At 19:30, the Yugoslav Supreme Command advised Petrović that he had approval to withdraw endangered units on the right wing of the 7th Army. Morale in the 7th Army had started to decline due to fifth column elements encouraging soldiers to stop resisting the enemy.

=== 8 April ===
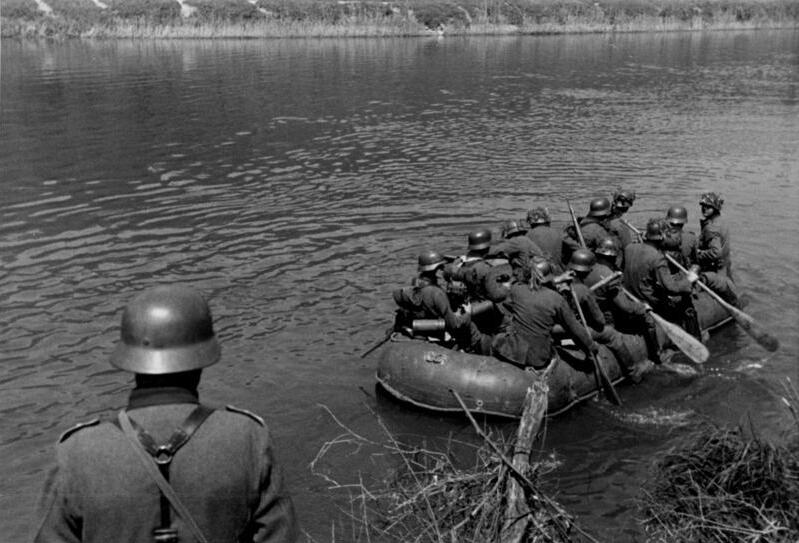
German soldiers crossing a river using an inflatable boat, similar to those used by Kampfgruppe Palten to cross the Pesnica river

On the night of 7/8 April, Petrović ordered Trifunović to begin to withdraw, first to a line through the Dravinja river, Zidani Most bridge and the right bank of the Krka river. Later in the day this was moved back to the line of the Kupa river. This ended the successful defence of the 38th Infantry Division Dravska along the line of the Drava, and meant their withdrawal from Maribor. Disregarding orders from above, Palten exploited their withdrawal by leading his kampfgruppe south towards the town, and crossing the Pesnica river in inflatable boats, leaving his unit vehicles behind. In the evening, Palten and his force entered Maribor unopposed, taking 100 prisoners. For disregarding orders, Palten and his kampfgruppe were ordered to return to Spielfeld, and spent the rest of the invasion guarding the border. In the meantime, the forward elements of the two divisions consolidated their bridgeheads, with the 132nd Infantry Division securing Maribor, and the 183rd Infantry Division pushing past Murska Sobota, reaching Kapelski Vrh.

Some bridges over the Sava were blown before all elements of the 7th and 8th Border Regiments had withdrawn, but some soldiers were able to swim across, the rest being captured by the advancing Germans. German patrols reached the Drava at Ptuj, and further east at Ormož they found the bridge had been blown. Elements of the XXXXIX Mountain Corps had pushed forward to Poljana and Dravograd. The German troops received close air support from dive bombers and fighters during their advance, while medium bombers hit targets throughout the 7th Army area. The 4th Fighter Regiment clashed several times with German aircraft on 8 April without result. Three Blenheims of the Yugoslav 8th Bomber Regiment again flew a mission to attack a target in southern Austria, escorted by 4th Fighter Regiment Hurricanes, but the rest of the 8th Bomber Regiment was awaiting orders to bomb a rebelling Yugoslav regiment of the neighbouring 4th Army in Bjelovar; the orders were subsequently cancelled. During the day, the Italian 3rd Alpine Group captured Kranjska Gora at the headwaters of the Sava in the sector of Mountain Detachment Triglavski. The German orders for the following day were for LI Infantry Corps to force a crossing of the Drava near Varazdin and advance on Zagreb, while XXXXIX Mountain Corps were to drive towards Celje.

=== 9 April ===
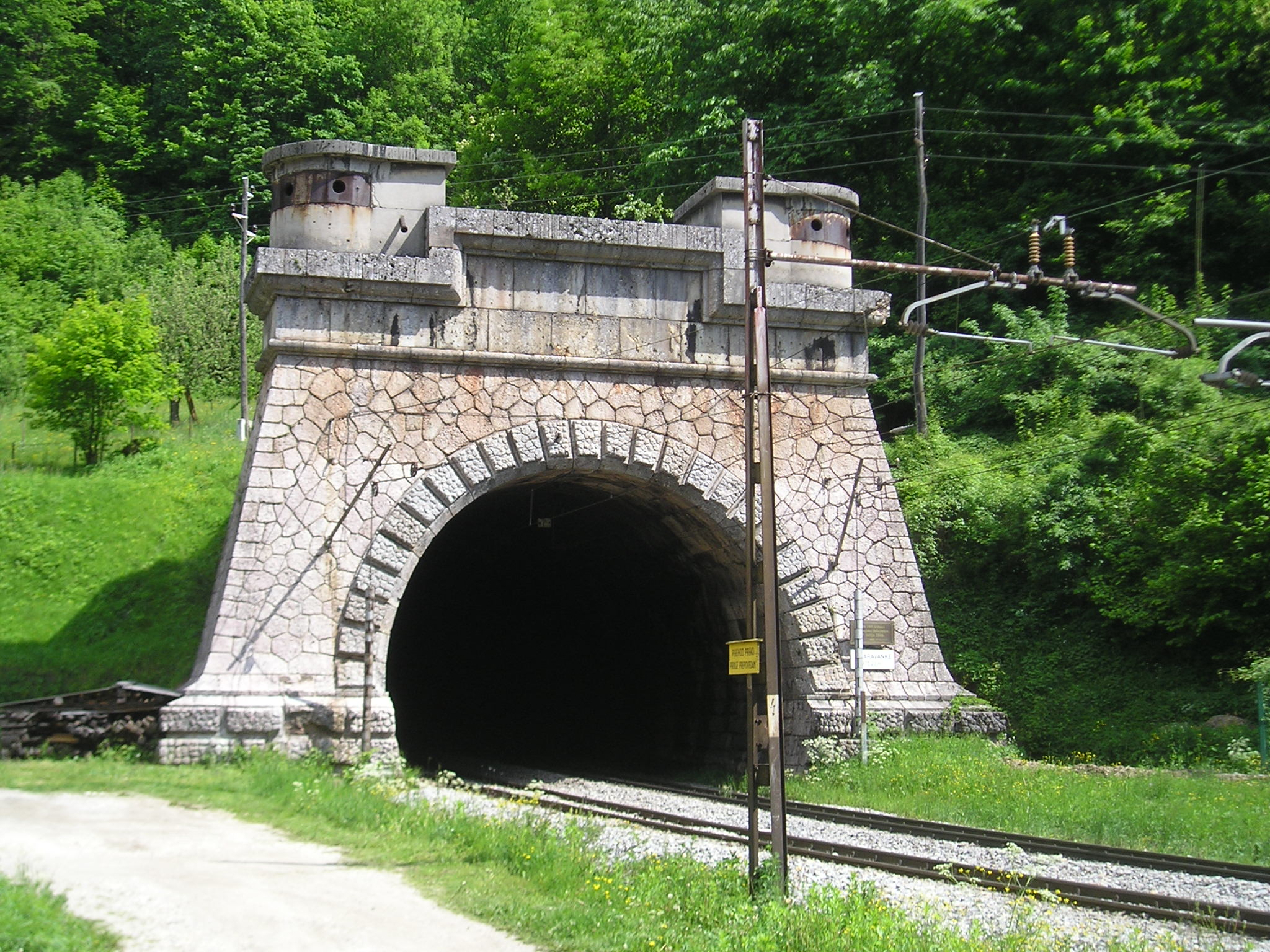
The southern exit of the Karawanks railway tunnel, secured by elements of XXXXIX Mountain Corps on 9 April 1941

On 9 April, the Germans continued their advance, and all elements of both divisions of LI Infantry Corps had finally unloaded in Graz. In view of German success, the Italian 2nd Army in north-eastern Italy accelerated its preparations and issued orders for its V and XI Corps to conduct preliminary operations aimed at improving their starting positions for the planned attack on Yugoslavia. In the meantime, the 7th Army continued rapidly withdrawing its right wing, while withdrawing its centre and keeping the Mountain Detachment Rišnajaski in place on its left flank. The 38th Infantry Division Dravska continued to withdraw south from Ptuj through Krapina towards Zagreb, while the 32nd Infantry Division Triglavski and Mountain Detachment Triglavski fell back to the southern bank of the Krka river. Units of LI Infantry Corps crossed the Drava along the line Maribor—Ptuj and further east, and continued to expand their bridgehead south of Maribor. Elements of XXXXIX Mountain Corps secured the southern exit of the Karawanks railway tunnel near Jesenice and expanded their bridgehead at Dravograd. Italian units made several attacks on the weakened sector of the 32nd Infantry Division Triglavski and against Mountain Detachment Rišnajaski, and Detachment Lika took up positions on the coast. On the same day, the 6th Air Reconnaissance Group airfield at Cerklje was again attacked by German aircraft.

As the activities of Natlačen and his NszS were continuing, the Yugoslav Supreme Command ordered their arrest. Rupnik and the head of the operations staff of the headquarters of the 1st Army Group, Pukovnik Franjo Nikolić, hid the orders from Petrović and did not carry them out.

=== 10 April ===
German gains in the 7th Army sector by nightfall on 10 April (shown in red)

On the evening of 9 April, the commander of the German 2nd Army, Generaloberst (Note: Equivalent to a U.S. Army general.) Maximilian von Weichs, ordered the XXXXVI Motorised Corps to break out of its bridgeheads in the 4th Army's sector the following day. The thrust from the Zákány bridgehead was to drive straight west to Zagreb then continue west to cut off the withdrawing 7th Army. This attack was led by the 14th Panzer Division, supported by dive bombers, and was a resounding success. By 19:30 on 10 April, lead elements of the 14th Panzer Division had reached the outskirts of Zagreb, having covered nearly 160 kilometres (99 miles) in a single day. Before it arrived, the Ustaše, supported by German agents, had proclaimed the creation of the Independent State of Croatia (Croatian: Nezavisna Država Hrvatska, NDH). By the time it entered Zagreb, the 14th Panzer Division was met by cheering crowds, and had captured 15,000 Yugoslav troops, including 22 generals.

In the 7th Army sector, about 09:45, the LI Infantry Corps began crossing the Drava, but construction of a bridge near Maribor was suspended because the river was in flood. Despite this, the 183rd Infantry Division managed to secure an alternative crossing point, and established a bridgehead. This crossing point was a partially destroyed bridge, guarded by a single platoon of the 1st Bicycle Battalion of Detachment Ormozki, the far left formation of the 4th Army. This crossing, combined with the withdrawal of the 38th Infantry Division Dravska from the line from Slovenska Bistrica to Ptuj, exposed the left flank of Detachment Ormozki. The Detachment attempted to withdraw south, but began to disintegrate during the night of 10/11 April.

That same night, the 1st Mountain Division, the most capable formation of XXXXIX Mountain Corps, had de-trained, crossed the border near Bleiburg, and advanced southeast towards Celje, reaching a point about 19 km (12 mi) from the town by evening. The rest of the XXXXIX Mountain Corps encountered little resistance, and by nightfall had reached the line Šoštanj–Mislinja. Luftwaffe reconnaissance sorties revealed that the main body of the 7th Army was withdrawing towards Zagreb, leaving behind light forces to maintain contact with the German bridgeheads. When it received this information, 2nd Army headquarters ordered LI Infantry Corps to form motorised columns to pursue the 7th Army south, but extreme weather conditions and flooding of the Drava at Maribor on 10 April slowed the German pursuit.

On 10 April, as the situation was becoming increasingly desperate throughout the country, Simović, who was both the Prime Minister and Chief of the General Staff, broadcast the following message:

All troops must engage the enemy wherever encountered and with every means at their disposal. Don't wait for direct orders from above, but act on your own and be guided by your judgement, initiative, and conscience.

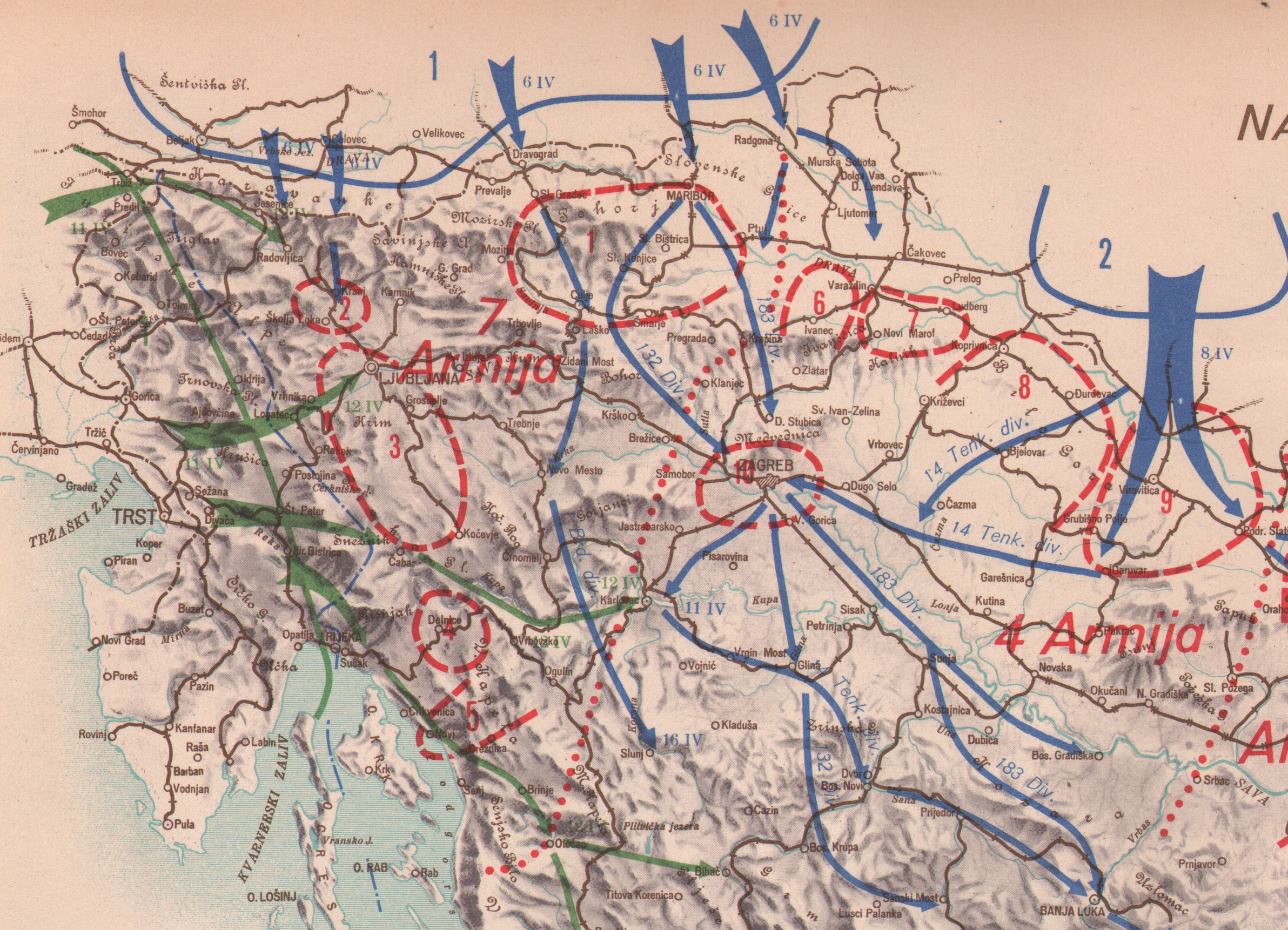
Crop of an official Yugoslav Government map illustrating Axis operations in the 7th Army area: German attacks in blue; Italian attacks in green

During the night of 10/11 April, XXXXIX Mountain Corps was ordered to bridge the Savinja river at Celje, then advance towards Brežice on the Sava, and LI Infantry Corps was directed to link up with the 14th Panzer Division which would then drive west to Karlovac. The Italians were expected to commence offensive action by attacking southwards to link up with the 14th Panzer Division in the vicinity of Karlovac.

=== 11 April ===
On 11 April, Ustaše elements captured the staff of the 7th Army at Topusko and handed them over to the Germans shortly thereafter, and the 7th Army effectively ceased to exist as a formation. Petrović and the staff of 1st Army Group headquarters were also captured by Ustaše at Petrinja. Chaos ensued throughout the 7th Army, whose Croat and Slovene soldiers could hear fifth column radio broadcasts telling them of their pending encirclement by the Germans and encouraging them to return to their homes and not fight against the invaders. This was reinforced by Natlačen and his NszS, who had distributed leaflets on the night of 10/11 April urging soldiers not to resist the Italians or Germans. To maintain public order, the NszS also formed a "Slovenian Legion" on 11 April, and encouraged Slovene nationalists among the 7th Army to join it. This force, split into a dozen units and totalling 2,000–3,000 men, then began to assist the Germans in disarming units of the Yugoslav Army on Slovene territory. The NszS authorised Natlačen to negotiate with the Germans for the creation of a Slovene client state along the lines of the NDH and the Slovak Republic, and Natlačen appointed the Ljubljana police chief Lovro Hacin to make contact with the Germans.

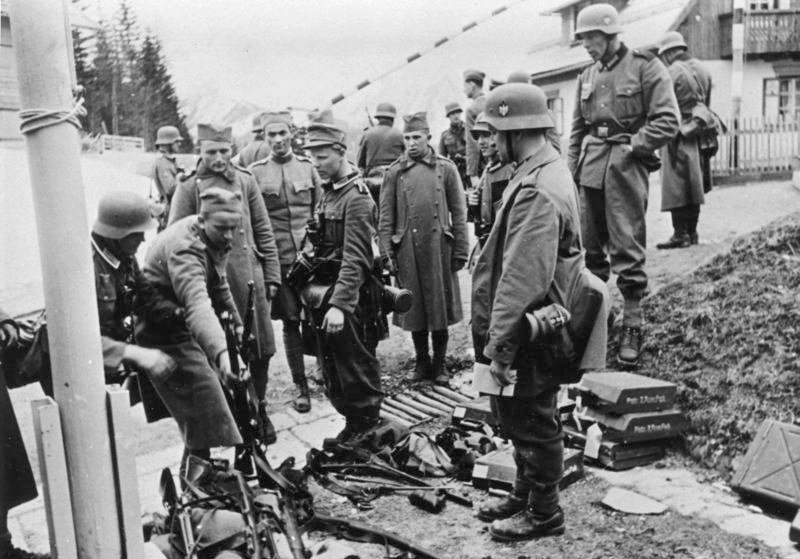
Surrendered Yugoslav troops handing in their weapons on 6 April 1941.

Proxies for the NszS approached Generalmajor (Note: Equivalent to a U.S. Army brigadier general.) Hubert Lanz, the commander of the 1st Mountain Division, when his formation approached Celje, but Lanz was not empowered to negotiate with civilians, and sought direction from higher headquarters. All German commanders were authorised to negotiate with the commanders of Yugoslav military formations so long as they agreed to surrender all weapons. Later that day, Lanz was authorised to meet with Natlačen the following day, and XXXXIX Mountain Corps took Celje. Held up by freezing weather and snow storms, LI Infantry Corps was approaching Zagreb from the north, and broke through a hastily established defensive line between Pregrada and Krapina. Bicycle-mounted troops of the 183rd Infantry Division turned east to secure Ustaše-controlled Varaždin. In the evening, LI Infantry Corps entered Zagreb and relieved the 14th Panzer Division but lead elements of that division had already thrust west from Zagreb into the rear of the withdrawing 7th Army and captured Karlovac.

Around 12:00, the Italians went over to the offensive, with the 3rd Alpine Group tasked to advance to the line Selca–Radovljica, XI Corps to push via Logatec to Ljubljana, VI Corps to drive on Prezid, and V Corps to advance from Fiume towards Kraljevica then Lokve. While one Italian attack south of the Snežnik plateau was stopped by elements of the Mountain Detachment Rišnajaski and the Italian advance was held up by border troops in some areas, there was little significant resistance, and by the end of the day they had captured Sušak, Bakar, Delnice, Jesenice, Vrhnika, Logatec and Ljubljana. To assist the Italian advance, the Luftwaffe attacked Yugoslav troops in the Ljubljana region, and the 14th Panzer Division, which had captured Zagreb on 10 April, drove west to encircle the withdrawing 7th Army. The Italians faced little resistance, and captured about 30,000 troops of the 7th Army waiting to surrender near Delnice. When the Italian 14th Infantry Division Isonzo entered Ljubljana, a delegate of the NszS greeted its commander, Generale di Divisione (Note: Equivalent to a U.S. Army major general.) Federico Romero, and symbolically handed him the keys to the city. An official reception was held for Romero that evening, attended by Natlačen and most of the members of the NszS, but because Natlačen and the council preferred that the Germans occupy Ljubljana, he asked Romero for permission to travel to Celje the following day to meet with Lanz.

== Fate ==
On 12 April, the 14th Panzer Division linked up with the Italians at Vrbovsko, closing the ring around the remnants of the 7th Army, which surrendered, and the 1st Mountain Division pushed through Novo Mesto and Črnomelj without facing resistance, reaching Vinice by the end of the day. At Celje, Lanz received a delegation led by Natlačen which included Andrej Gosar. The meeting was very formal and cold, as Lanz had already received orders regarding the break-up of Slovenia into Italian and German-controlled territories, and the council and its goal of an independent Slovenia were superfluous from a German perspective.

Remnants of the 4th Army conducted a fighting withdrawal through Bosnia towards Sarajevo over the following days, pursued by the 14th Panzer Division and elements of LI Infantry Corps but a ceasefire was declared at noon on 15 April. After a delay in locating appropriate signatories for the surrender document, the Yugoslav Supreme Command unconditionally surrendered in Belgrade effective at 12:00 on 18 April. Yugoslavia was then occupied and dismembered by the Axis powers, with Germany, Italy, Hungary, Bulgaria and Albania all annexing parts of its territory. Most of the Slovene members of the 7th Army taken as prisoners of war were soon released by the Axis powers, as 90 per cent of those held for the duration of the war were Serbs.
