= 32nd Infantry Division Triglavski =

Royal Yugoslav Army formation

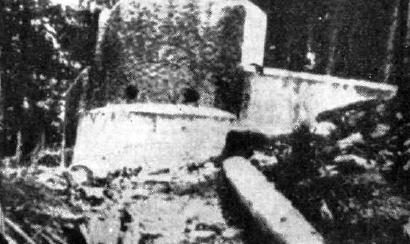
- An example of a bunker built on Mount Blegoš by the Yugoslav Army prior to the invasion of Yugoslavia
- Active: 1935 – 12 April 1941
- Country: Kingdom of Yugoslavia
- Branch: Royal Yugoslav Army
- Type: Infantry
- Size: Division
- Part of: 7th Army
- Patron: Triglav
- Engagements: World War II: Invasion of Yugoslavia

Commanders
- Notable commanders: Dragiša Pandurović

The 32nd Infantry Division Triglavski was a short-lived Royal Yugoslav Army infantry formation raised prior to the German-led Axis invasion of the Kingdom of Yugoslavia in April 1941. It was largely mobilised from the Dravska military district, and, like all Yugoslav infantry divisions of the time, was a very large and unwieldy formation which was almost entirely reliant on animal transport for mobility. Commanded by Divizijski đeneral Dragiša Pandurović and largely manned by Slovene troops, the division also lacked modern arms and sufficient ammunition.

Part of the Yugoslav 7th Army, it was deployed west and southwest of Ljubljana in the Julian Alps, along the western border with Italy from Mount Bička north to Mount Blegoš. It was not heavily engaged during the first few days of the invasion, but from 9 April it withdrew steadily due to retirements on the right flank of the 7th Army and in the face of the advancing German XXXXIX Mountain Corps of General der Infanterie Ludwig Kübler. The Italian Second Army, commanded by Generale designato d’Armata Vittorio Ambrosio, joined the invasion on 9 April, and the 14th Panzer Division linked up with Italian thrusts further south to encircle the remnants of the 7th Army. The division surrendered on 12 April, along with the rest of the 7th Army.

== Background ==
A map showing the location of Yugoslavia in Europe

The Kingdom of Serbs, Croats and Slovenes was created with the merger of Serbia, Montenegro and the South Slav-inhabited areas of Austria-Hungary on 1 December 1918, in the immediate aftermath of World War I. The Army of the Kingdom of Serbs, Croats and Slovenes was established to defend the new state. It was formed around the nucleus of the victorious Royal Serbian Army, as well as armed formations raised in regions formerly controlled by Austria-Hungary. Many former Austro-Hungarian officers and soldiers became members of the new army. From the beginning, much like other aspects of public life in the new kingdom, the army was dominated by ethnic Serbs, who saw it as a means by which to secure Serb political hegemony.

The army's development was hampered by the kingdom's poor economy, and this continued during the 1920s. In 1929, King Alexander changed the name of the country to the Kingdom of Yugoslavia, at which time the army was renamed the Royal Yugoslav Army (Serbo-Croatian Latin: Vojska Kraljevine Jugoslavije, VKJ). The army budget remained tight, and as tensions rose across Europe during the 1930s, it became difficult to secure weapons and munitions from other countries. Consequently, at the time World War II broke out in September 1939, the VKJ had several serious weaknesses, which included reliance on draught animals for transport, and the large size of its formations. Infantry divisions had a wartime strength of 26,000–27,000 men, as compared to contemporary British infantry divisions of half that strength. These characteristics resulted in slow, unwieldy formations. The inadequate supply of arms and munitions also meant that even the very large Yugoslav formations had low firepower. Generals better suited to the trench warfare of World War I were combined with an army that was neither equipped nor trained to resist the fast-moving combined arms approach used by the Germans in their invasions of Poland and France.

The weaknesses of the VKJ in strategy, structure, equipment, mobility and supply were exacerbated by serious ethnic disunity within Yugoslavia, resulting from two decades of Serb hegemony and the attendant lack of political legitimacy achieved by the central government. Attempts to address the disunity came too late to ensure that the VKJ was a cohesive force. Fifth column activity was also a serious concern, not only from the Croatian nationalist Ustaše but also from the country's Slovene and ethnic German minorities.

== Structure ==
=== Peacetime organisation ===
According to regulations issued by the VKJ in 1935, the headquarters of the 32nd Infantry Division Triglavski (32nd ID) would be created at the time of mobilisation. Unlike most other Yugoslav divisions, the 32nd ID did not have a corresponding divisional district in peacetime, and would be allocated units from other divisional districts and the VKJ reserve when it was formed. The division was named for Triglav, the highest mountain in Yugoslavia.

=== Wartime organisation ===
The wartime organisation of the VKJ was laid down by regulations issued in 1936–37, which set the strength of an infantry division at 26,000–27,000 men. A total of 11,200 horses and other pack and draught animals were required to provide mobility for each infantry division. The theoretical wartime organisation of a fully mobilised Yugoslav infantry division was:

- headquarters
- divisional infantry headquarters, with three or four infantry regiments
- divisional artillery headquarters, with one or two artillery regiments
- a cavalry battalion with two squadrons, a bicycle squadron and a machine gun platoon
- a pioneer battalion of three companies
- an anti-tank company, equipped with twelve 37 mm (1.5 in) or 47 mm (1.9 in) anti-tank guns
- a machine gun company
- an anti-aircraft machine gun company
- a signals company
- logistics units

Each infantry regiment was to consist of three or four infantry battalions and a machine gun company, and the divisional artillery regiments were animal-drawn and largely equipped with World War I-vintage pieces. An artillery regiment consisted of four battalions, one of 100 mm (3.9 in) light howitzers, one of 65 mm (2.6 in) or 75 mm (3.0 in) mountain guns, and two of 75 mm (3.0 in) or 80 mm (3.1 in) field guns. The 32nd ID was included on the wartime order of battle in "Defence Plan S", which was developed by the Yugoslav General Staff in 1938–1939. It was to be formed using mainly Slovene-manned units administered by the Dravska divisional district: the 39th and 40th Infantry Regiments and 32nd Artillery Regiment; and an additional infantry regiment, the 110th, attached from the VJK reserve.

== Planned deployment ==
Planned deployment locations for 32nd Infantry Division Triglavski and flanking formations

The 32nd ID was a component of the 7th Army, which was itself part of the 1st Army Group, responsible for the Yugoslav borders with Italy and Germany. According to the final war plan developed by the Yugoslav General Staff, "Defence Plan R-41", the planned deployment area for the division was southwest of Ljubljana in the Julian Alps, along the western border with Italy from Mount Bička north to Mount Blegoš. On the left flank of the division was Mountain Detachment Risnjački (MD Risnjački), and on its right flank was Mountain Detachment Triglavski (MD Triglavski). Both of these flanking formations were ad hoc groupings of brigade strength. Within the divisional area of responsibility, the 2nd and 3rd Border Regiments were manning fortifications, supported by two border artillery battalions fielding eight batteries.

Prior to the invasion, significant fortifications known as the Rupnik Line were constructed along the Italian and German borders, within what became the 7th Army's area of operations. Along the frontier with Italy in the sector of the 32nd ID, mutually supporting bunkers were established on forward slopes of the mountain ranges behind a belt of obstacles. The main positions followed a line from Mount Blegoš south-south-east through Hlavče Njive, Žirovski Vrh, Vrh Svetih Treh Kraljev, Zaplana, Mount Slivnica, Grahovo, and Lož to Petičak. These fortifications were to be manned by border guard units, and were not the responsibility of the 7th Army.

== Operations ==
=== Mobilisation ===
After unrelenting pressure from Adolf Hitler, Yugoslavia signed the Tripartite Pact on 25 March 1941. On 27 March, a military coup d'état overthrew the government that had signed the pact, and a new government was formed under the Royal Yugoslav Army Air Force commander, Armijski đeneral (Note: Equivalent to a U.S. Army lieutenant general.) Dušan Simović. A general mobilisation was not called by the new government until 3 April 1941, out of fear of offending Hitler and thus precipitating war. However, on the same day as the coup Hitler issued Führer Directive 25 which called for Yugoslavia to be treated as a hostile state, and on 3 April, Führer Directive 26 was issued, detailing the plan of attack and command structure for the invasion, which was to commence on 6 April.

According to a post-war U.S. Army study, by the time the invasion commenced, the 32nd ID had only commenced mobilisation. A significant part of the division was moving from its mobilisation areas to its concentration areas, while some elements were still mobilising. Overall, around 80 per cent of the divisional personnel and 45–50 per cent of the necessary draught animals had been mobilised. On 6 April, the division was located as follows:

- the divisional commander Divizijski đeneral (Note: Equivalent to a U.S. Army major general.) Dragiša Pandurović and his staff were mobilising in Ljubljana, and arrived in their concentration area at Grosuplje, just south of Ljubljana around noon on 6 April
- the divisional infantry headquarters was moving from Celje to Ljubljana
- the 39th Infantry Regiment was marching from Celje to Lepoglava to join Detachment Ormozki of the 4th Army, and had reached Logatec
- the 40th Infantry Regiment, with about 80 percent of its troops and 50 percent of its vehicles and animals, was located at its mobilisation centre in Ljubljana
- the 110th Infantry Regiment, with about 60 percent of its troops and 50 percent of its animals, was on the move from Celje to Zagreb, where it was to join the 1st Army Group reserve, and had reached Zidani Most
- the 32nd Artillery Regiment was marching from Ljubljana to Grosuplje
- the 37th Infantry Regiment, which had been allocated to the 32nd ID from the Dravska divisional district at mobilisation, was moving from its mobilisation centres to divisional reserve positions around Ribnica, Sodražica, Bloke, Lašče and Novo Mesto
- other divisional units were mobilising in Ribnica, Ljubljana and Celje

=== Operations ===
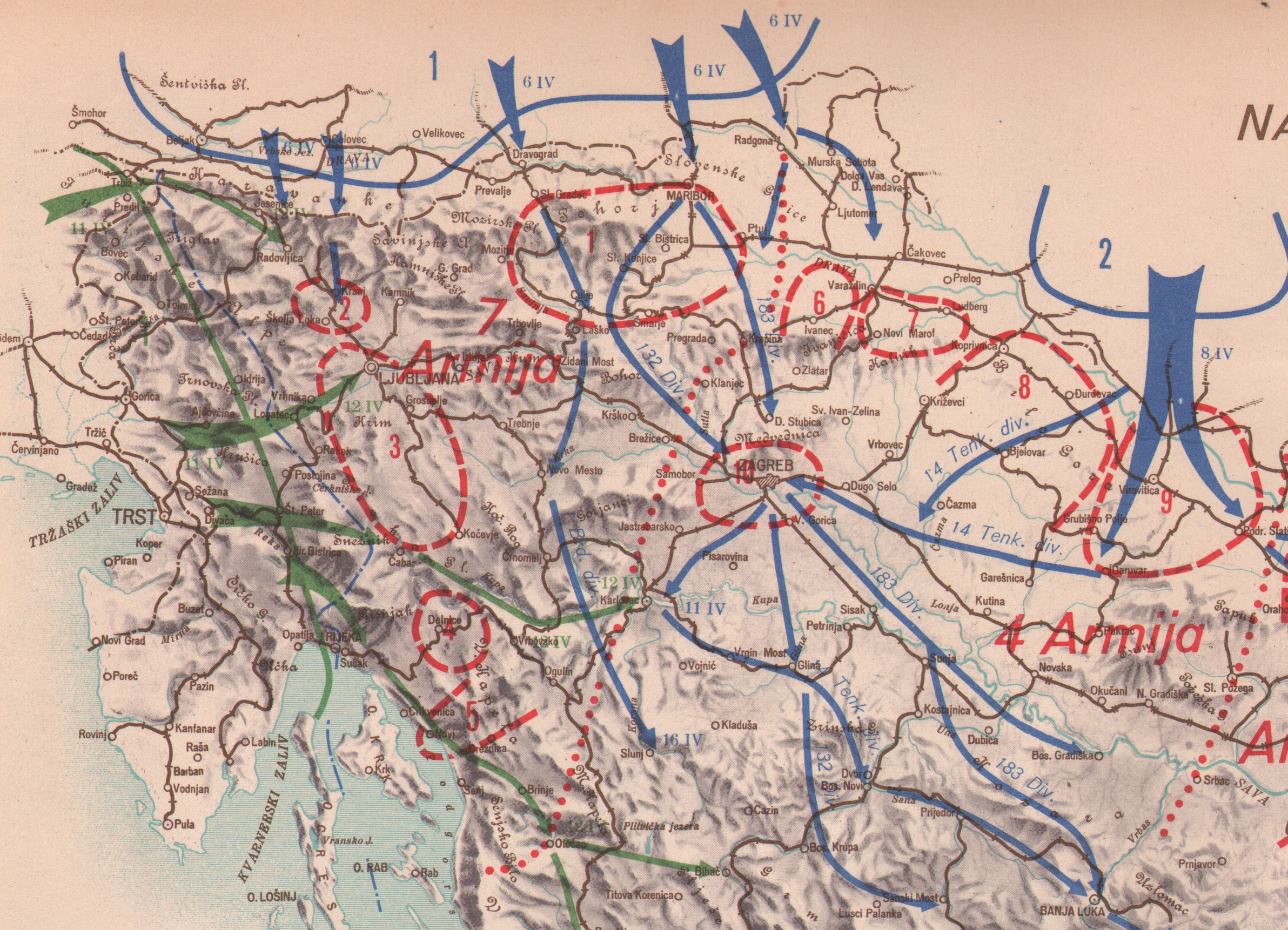
Crop of an official Yugoslav Government map illustrating Axis operations in the 7th Army area: 32nd ID is marked by a red dashed shape with a 3; German attacks in blue; Italian attacks in green

The border between Italy, Germany and Yugoslavia was largely unsuitable for motorised operations due to its mountainous terrain. Due to the short notice of the invasion, the elements of Generaloberst (Note: Equivalent to a U.S. Army general.) Maximilian von Weichs's invading German 2nd Army that would make up LI Infantry Corps and XXXXIX Mountain Corps had to be transported from Germany, German-occupied France and the Nazi puppet Slovak Republic, and nearly all encountered difficulties in reaching their assembly areas in time for 6 April. The commander of the Italian Second Army, Generale designato d’Armata (Note: Equivalent to an acting U.S. Army general of the army.) Vittorio Ambrosio, had been provided with intelligence that estimated the elements of the Yugoslav 7th Army opposite him as totalling 230,000 men, whereas in fact they only numbered 50,000.

On the morning of 6 April, Luftwaffe (German Air Force) aircraft conducted surprise attacks on Yugoslav airfields in the 7th Army area, including Ljubljana. At 07:00, Messerschmitt Bf 109E fighters of Jagdgeschwader 27 strafed Ljubljana airfield, attacking hangars and some Potez 25 biplanes. This was followed by attacks by the Regia Aeronautica (Italian Air Force) on Yugoslav troop concentrations of the 7th Army. German and Italian air attacks interfered with the deployment of troops and command was hampered by reliance on civilian telegraph and telephone services. The front along the border with Italy was relatively quiet, with some patrol clashes occurring, some sporadic artillery bombardments of border fortifications, and an unsuccessful raid by the Italians directed at Mount Blegoš. On 7 April, along the Italian border there were only skirmishes caused by Italian reconnaissance-in-force to a depth of 3 km (1.9 mi). By the end of the day, morale in the 7th Army had started to decline due to fifth column elements encouraging soldiers to stop resisting the enemy.

In the area of responsibility of the 32nd ID, the XXXXIX Mountain Corps of General der Infanterie (Note: Equivalent to a U.S. Army lieutenant general.) Ludwig Kübler was significantly delayed, and did not start pushing forward until 8 April. German medium bombers hit targets throughout the 7th Army area on that day. Orders were issued for XXXXIX Mountain Corps to drive towards Celje the following day. On 9 April, the Germans advanced on Celje. In response to withdrawals on the right flank of the 7th Army, 32nd ID and MD Triglavski fell back towards the southern bank of the Krka river southeast of Ljubljana, but MD Risnjački held its position on the left flank of the 32nd ID. Elements of XXXXIX Mountain Corps secured the southern exit of the Karawanks railway tunnel near Jesenice. In view of German success, the Italian Second Army in north-eastern Italy accelerated its preparations and issued orders for its V and XI Corps to conduct preliminary operations aimed at improving their starting positions for the planned attack on Yugoslavia, and the Italians made several weak attacks on the sector held by 32nd ID.

On 10 April, as the situation was becoming increasingly desperate throughout the country, Simović, who was both the Prime Minister and Chief of the General Staff, broadcast the following message:

All troops must engage the enemy wherever encountered and with every means at their disposal. Don't wait for direct orders from above, but act on your own and be guided by your judgement, initiative, and conscience.

The same day, Luftwaffe reconnaissance sorties revealed that the main body of the 7th Army was withdrawing towards Zagreb, leaving behind light forces to maintain contact with the German bridgeheads. That night, the 1st Mountain Division of Generalmajor (Note: Equivalent to a U.S. Army brigadier general.) Hubert Lanz, the most capable formation of XXXXIX Mountain Corps, detrained, crossed the border near Bleiburg, and advanced southeast towards Celje, reaching a point about 19 km (12 mi) from the town by evening. The rest of the XXXXIX Mountain Corps encountered little resistance, and by nightfall had reached the line Šoštanj–Mislinja. During the night of 10/11 April, XXXXIX Mountain Corps was ordered to bridge the Savinja river at Celje, then advance towards Brežice on the Sava.

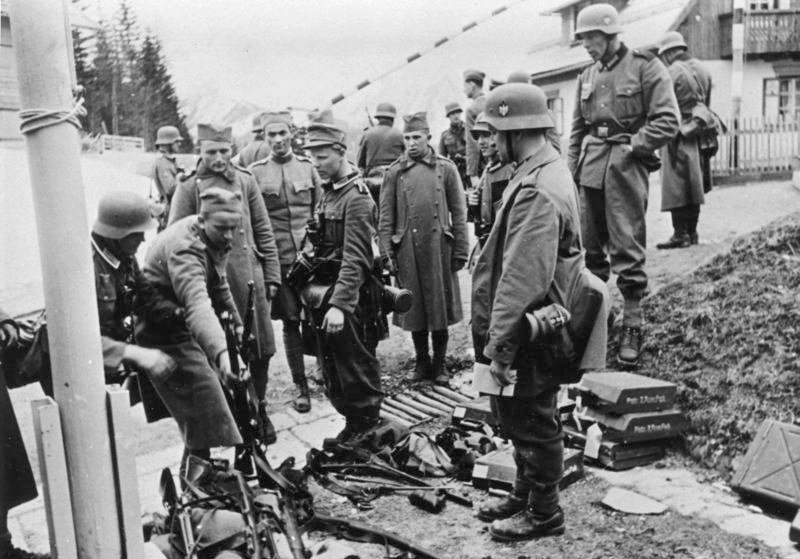
Surrendered Yugoslav troops handing in their weapons

The Germans captured Celje on 11 April, by which time the whole 7th Army was withdrawing in disarray, and the 14th Panzer Division of Generalmajor Friedrich Kühn was creating havoc in the rear areas. Having captured Zagreb the previous day, it had pushed west to Karlovac, encircling the 7th Army. The Italians went over to the offensive on the 11th, with the 3rd Alpine Group tasked to advance to the line Selca–Radovljica, XI Corps to push via Logatec to Ljubljana, VI Corps to drive on Prezid, and V Corps to advance from Fiume towards Kraljevica then Lokve. While one Italian attack south of the Snežnik plateau was stopped by elements of MD Risnjački and the Italian advance was held up by border troops in some areas, there was little significant resistance, and by the end of the day they had captured Sušak, Bakar, Delnice, Jesenice, Vrhnika, Logatec and Ljubljana. To assist the Italian advance, the Luftwaffe attacked Yugoslav troops in the Ljubljana region, but the Italians faced little resistance, and captured about 30,000 troops of the 7th Army waiting to surrender near Delnice. On 12 April, the 14th Panzer Division linked up with the Italians at Vrbovsko, closing the ring around the remnants of the 7th Army, including the 32nd ID, which promptly surrendered.

On 15 April, orders were received that a ceasefire had been agreed, and that all 7th Army troops were to remain in place and not fire on German personnel. After a delay in locating appropriate signatories for the surrender document, the Yugoslav Supreme Command unconditionally surrendered in Belgrade effective at 12:00 on 18 April. Yugoslavia was then occupied and dismembered by the Axis powers, with Germany, Italy, Hungary, Bulgaria and Albania all annexing parts of its territory. Most of the Slovene members of the division taken as prisoners of war were soon released by the Axis powers, as 90 per cent of those held for the duration of the war were Serbs.
