= 38th Infantry Division Dravska =

1941 Royal Yugoslav Army formation

- Active: 1941
- Disbanded: 1941
- Country: Kingdom of Yugoslavia
- Branch: Royal Yugoslav Army
- Type: Infantry
- Size: Division
- Part of: 7th Army
- Engagements: Invasion of Yugoslavia

Commanders
- Notable commanders: Čedomir Stanojlović

The 38th Infantry Division Dravska was a short-lived Royal Yugoslav Army infantry formation raised prior to the German-led Axis invasion of the Kingdom of Yugoslavia in April 1941. It was largely mobilised from the Dravska divisional district, and, like all Yugoslav infantry divisions of the time, was a very large and unwieldy formation which was almost entirely reliant on animal transport for mobility. Commanded by Divizijski đeneral (Note: Equivalent to a U.S. Army major general.) Čedomir Stanojlović and largely manned by Slovene and ethnic German troops, the division also lacked modern arms and sufficient ammunition to meet the German onslaught.

Part of the Yugoslav 7th Army, it was to be deployed in the Pohorje mountains around Maribor, responsible for the German frontier from the Savinja Alps in the west to Radgona in the east, including the roads running south through Dravograd and Maribor, with its main positions on the southern bank of the Dravinja river. When the invasion commenced on 6 April, much of the division was deployed forward at Dravograd and Maribor, where, along with the border guard units along the frontier, it briefly held a defensive line. German penetration on its right flank soon resulted in withdrawal to the Dravinja and subsequent attempts to form a defensive line failed. Undermined by fifth column activities and faced with German thrusts by two German corps through Dravograd and Maribor, the division fell back in disarray and surrendered with the rest of the 7th Army on 12 April.

== Background ==
A map showing the location of Yugoslavia in Europe

The Kingdom of Serbs, Croats and Slovenes was created with the merger of Serbia, Montenegro and the South Slav-inhabited areas of Austria-Hungary on 1 December 1918, in the immediate aftermath of World War I. The Army of the Kingdom of Serbs, Croats and Slovenes was established to defend the new state. It was formed around the nucleus of the victorious Royal Serbian Army, as well as armed formations raised in regions formerly controlled by Austria-Hungary. Many former Austro-Hungarian officers and soldiers became members of the new army. From the beginning, much like other aspects of public life in the new kingdom, the army was dominated by ethnic Serbs, who saw it as a means by which to secure Serb political hegemony.

The army's development was hampered by the kingdom's poor economy, and this continued during the 1920s. In 1929, King Alexander changed the name of the country to the Kingdom of Yugoslavia, at which time the army was renamed the Royal Yugoslav Army (Serbo-Croatian Latin: Vojska Kraljevine Jugoslavije, VKJ). The army budget remained tight, and as tensions rose across Europe during the 1930s, it became difficult to secure weapons and munitions from other countries. Consequently, at the time World War II broke out in September 1939, the VKJ had several serious weaknesses, which included reliance on draught animals for transport, and the large size of its formations. Infantry divisions had a wartime strength of 26,000–27,000 men, as compared to contemporary British infantry divisions of half that strength. These characteristics resulted in slow, unwieldy formations, and the inadequate supply of arms and munitions meant that even the very large Yugoslav formations had low firepower. Generals better suited to the trench warfare of World War I were combined with an army that was neither equipped nor trained to resist the fast-moving combined arms approach used by the Germans in their invasions of Poland and France.

The weaknesses of the VKJ in strategy, structure, equipment, mobility and supply were exacerbated by serious ethnic disunity within Yugoslavia, resulting from two decades of Serb hegemony and the attendant lack of political legitimacy achieved by the central government. Attempts to address the disunity came too late to ensure that the VKJ was a cohesive force. Fifth column activity was also a serious concern, not only from the Croatian nationalist Ustaše but also from the country's Slovene and ethnic German minorities.

== Structure ==
=== Peacetime organisation ===
According to regulations issued by the VKJ in 1935, the 38th Infantry Division Dravska (38th ID) was to be raised from the Dravska divisional district, which was headquartered in Ljubljana. The Dravska divisional district was under the control of the 4th Army district, headquartered in Zagreb. The division was named for the Drava river, which runs through the Styria region, and was largely manned by Slovene and ethnic German troops. In peacetime, the Dravska divisional district included:

- 37th Infantry Regiment, based in Ribnica
- 39th Infantry Regiment, based in Celje
- 40th Infantry Regiment, based in Ljubljana
- 45th Infantry Regiment, based in Maribor
- 16th Artillery Regiment, based in Ljubljana
- 32nd Artillery Regiment, based in Maribor

=== Wartime organisation ===
The wartime organisation of the VKJ was laid down by regulations issued in 1936–37, which set the strength of an infantry division at 26,000–27,000 men. A total of 11,200 horses and other pack and draught animals were required to provide mobility for each infantry division. The theoretical wartime organisation of a fully mobilised Yugoslav infantry division was:

- headquarters
- divisional infantry headquarters, with three or four infantry regiments
- divisional artillery headquarters, with one or two artillery regiments
- a cavalry battalion with two squadrons, a bicycle squadron and a machine gun platoon
- a pioneer battalion of three companies
- an anti-tank company, equipped with twelve 37 mm (1.5 in) or 47 mm (1.9 in) anti-tank guns
- a machine gun company
- an anti-aircraft machine gun company
- a signals company
- logistics units

Each infantry regiment was to consist of three to four infantry battalions and a machine gun company. The divisional artillery regiments were animal-drawn and largely equipped with World War I-vintage pieces. An artillery regiment consisted of four battalions, one of 100 mm (3.9 in) light howitzers, one of 65 mm (2.6 in) or 75 mm (3.0 in) mountain guns, and two of 75 mm (3.0 in) or 80 mm (3.1 in) field guns. The 37th, 39th and 40th Infantry Regiments and the 16th and 32nd Artillery Regiments, which were administered by the Dravska divisional district in peacetime, were earmarked to join other formations when they were mobilised, and the division was to be brought up to its wartime strength by the 38th and 112th Infantry Regiments and 38th Artillery Regiment from the VJK reserve.

== Planned deployment ==
Planned deployment locations for 38th ID and flanking formations

The 38th ID was a component of the 7th Army, a part of the 1st Army Group, which was responsible for the defence of north and north-western Yugoslavia. According to the final war plan developed by the Yugoslav General Staff, "Defence Plan R-41", the 7th Army was to deploy in a cordon along the Italian and German borders. The 38th ID was to deploy in the Pohorje mountains around Maribor, responsible for the German frontier from the Savinja Alps in the west to Gornja Radgona in the east, including the roads running south from the German border through Dravograd to Celje and Maribor to Ptuj. Both Dravograd and Maribor are on the Drava river, a major obstacle. The 38th ID was to establish its main positions on the southern bank of the Dravinja river, some 30–55 kilometres (19–34 mi) south of the Drava. On the left flank of the division was Mountain Detachment Triglavski (MD Triglavski), and on its right flank was Detachment Ormozki of the 4th Army. Both of these flanking formations were ad hoc groupings of brigade-strength. Border guard units in the divisional sector consisted of the 6th, 7th and 8th Border Regiments supported by three border artillery battalions fielding a total of eight batteries.

Prior to the invasion, significant fortifications known as the Rupnik Line were constructed along the German border. In what became the 38th ID sector, the Yugoslavs concentrated on preparing to block the passes through the Karawank and Savinja Alps, and built bunkers behind obstacles along the routes leading south from the border towards Dravograd and Maribor. Preparations were also made to block routes north of the Drava and along the southern banks of the Drava. These fortifications were to be manned by border guard units, and were not the responsibility of the 7th Army.

== Operations ==
=== Mobilisation ===
Following unrelenting political pressure from Adolf Hitler, Yugoslavia signed the Tripartite Pact on 25 March 1941. Two days later, a military coup d'état overthrew the government that had signed the pact, and a new government was formed under the Royal Yugoslav Army Air Force commander, Armijski đeneral (Note: Equivalent to a U.S. Army lieutenant general.) Dušan Simović. A general mobilisation was not called by the new government until 3 April 1941, out of fear of offending Hitler and thus precipitating war. This hesitation was in vain, for on the same day as the coup Hitler had issued Führer Directive 25 which called for Yugoslavia to be treated as a hostile state, and on 3 April, Führer Directive 26 was issued, detailing the plan of attack and command structure for the invasion, which was to commence on 6 April.

According to a post-war U.S. Army study, by the time the invasion began, the 38th ID had only commenced mobilising, and was largely in its mobilisation centres or moving to concentration areas. On 6 April, the elements of the division were located as follows:

- the divisional commander Divizijski đeneral (Note: Equivalent to a U.S. Army major general.) Čedomir Stanojlović, his chief of staff Major Ivan Babić, and their headquarters staff were mobilising in Slovenska Bistrica
- the divisional infantry headquarters and 45th Infantry Regiment were mobilising around Maribor
- the 38th Infantry Regiment was mobilising in Maribor, Slovenska Bistrica and Ptuj
- the 112th Infantry Regiment (less its 1st Battalion) was marching west towards Slovenj Gradec from Slovenska Bistrica. The 1st Battalion of the 112th Infantry Regiment had already deployed near Dravograd, supporting the 6th Border Regiment
- the 128th Infantry Regiment, which had been allocated to the 38th ID from the VKJ reserve at mobilisation, was concentrating near Ptuj
- the 38th Artillery Regiment (less its 2nd Battalion) was near Ptuj, while its 2nd Battalion was marching west from Maribor to its planned position at Slovenj Gradec
- the divisional machine-gun battalion, which had only 50 percent of its establishment of men and animals, was marching south from Maribor to Ptuj
- the remainder of the divisional units were mobilising in Slovenska Bistrica, Maribor, Ptuj and Ljubljana

=== 5–6 April ===
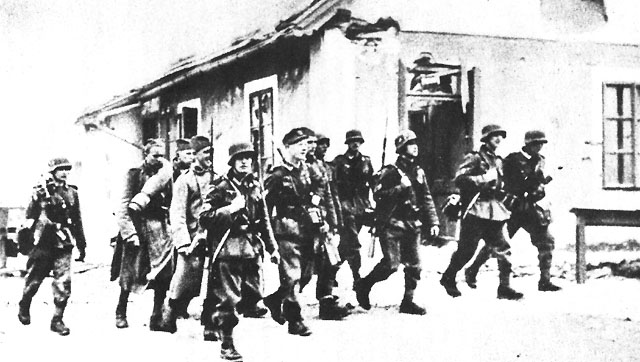
A German patrol returning from a cross-border raid, April 1941

The border between Germany and Yugoslavia was largely unsuitable for motorised operations due to the mountainous terrain. Due to the short notice of the invasion, the elements of Generaloberst (Note: Equivalent to a U.S. Army general.) Maximilian von Weichs's invading German 2nd Army that would make up LI Infantry Corps and XXXXIX Mountain Corps had to be transported from Germany, German-occupied France and the Nazi puppet Slovak Republic, and nearly all encountered difficulties in reaching their assembly areas on schedule. In the interim, the Germans formed a special force under the code name Feuerzauber (Magic Fire). This force was initially intended to merely reinforce the 538th Frontier Guard Division, which was guarding the German border. On the evening of 5 April, a particularly aggressive Feuerzauber detachment commander, Hauptmann Palten, led his Kampfgruppe Palten across the Mura river from Spielfeld and, having secured the bridge, began attacking bunkers and other Yugoslav positions on the high ground, and sent patrols deep into the Yugoslav border fortification system. Due to a lack of Yugoslav counter-attacks, many of these positions remained in German hands into 6 April.

On the morning of 6 April, German aircraft conducted surprise attacks on Yugoslav airfields in the 7th Army area, including Ljubljana. For example, at 07:00, Messerschmitt Bf 109E fighters of Jagdgeschwader 27 strafed Ljubljana airfield, attacking hangars and some Potez 25 biplanes. The LI Infantry Corps, commanded by General der Infanterie (Note: Equivalent to a U.S. Army lieutenant general.) Hans-Wolfgang Reinhard, was tasked with attacking towards Maribor then driving towards Zagreb. The XXXXIX Mountain Corps, under General der Infanterie Ludwig Kübler, was to capture Dravograd then force a crossing on the Sava river at Zidani Most. At 05:00 on 6 April, LI Infantry Corps captured the Mura bridges at Mureck and Radkersburg (opposite Gornja Radgona) undamaged. One column of LI Infantry Corps pushed towards Maribor from Mureck, and the other pushed on from Gornja Radgona through Lenart towards Ptuj. Some time later, other elements of LI Infantry Corps attacked the area between Sveti Duh and Dravograd. The 7th and 8th Border Regiments met these attacks with fierce resistance, but were forced to withdraw due to German pressure.

Generalmajor (Note: Equivalent to a U.S. Army brigadier general.) Benignus Dippold's 183rd Infantry Division of LI Infantry Corps captured 300 prisoners, and a bicycle-mounted detachment of the division reached Murska Sobota in the sector of the right flanking Detachment Ormozki without meeting any resistance. Generalmajor Rudolf Sintzenich's 132nd Infantry Division, also from LI Infantry Corps, pushed south along the Sejanski Creek valley towards Savci. By the end of the first day, LI Infantry Corps had occupied Gornja Radgona, Murska Sobota and Radenci, and had crossed the Drava near Sveti Duh. XXXXIX Mountain Corps captured border crossings on the approaches to Dravograd, but was held up by the 6th Border Regiment in mountain passes located further west at Ljubelj, Jezerski Vrh and Korensko sedlo. Late that day, German mountain pioneers destroyed some isolated Yugoslav bunkers in the area penetrated by Kampfgruppe Palten.

German gains on 6 April (shown in red) and major German objectives (shown in blue). Dravograd is to the west, and Maribor to the east.

German Junkers Ju 87 Stuka dive bombers of Sturzkampfgeschwader 77, escorted by Messerschmitt Bf 109E fighters, attacked airfields in the rear area of the 7th Army later that day. This was followed by attacks by the Italian Air Force on Yugoslav troop concentrations in the 7th Army area. The Yugoslav Air Force was unable to interdict the Axis air attacks because the Hawker Hurricanes and Ikarus IK-2 aircraft of its 4th Fighter Regiment were based 240 kilometres (150 mi) away at Bosanski Aleksandrovac. After having been grounded for most of the day by poor weather, in the afternoon Bristol Blenheim Mk I light bombers of the Yugoslav 68th Bomber Group flew missions against airfields and railway stations across the German frontier at Graz, Fürstenfeld, Steyr and Wiener Neustadt in an attempt to interdict the assembling Germans.

By the close of the first day, the 7th Army was still largely mobilising and concentrating, and this, combined with delays caused by fifth column actions meant that nearly all the fighting was conducted by border troops. Fifth columnists delayed but did not engage in combat with Yugoslav troops. The 38th ID was deployed along the southern bank of the Drava, with the 128th Infantry Regiment and an artillery battalion in depth around Ptuj, the 45th Infantry Regiment and an artillery battalion on the right around Maribor and the 112th Infantry Regiment and an artillery battalion on the left were at Slovenj Gradec and marching north towards Dravograd. German and Italian air attacks interfered with the deployment of troops and command was hampered by reliance on civilian telegraph and telephone services.

On that day, Marko Natlačen—the governor of the Drava Banovina (province)—met with representatives of the major Slovene political parties, and created the National Council of Slovenia (Slovene: Narodni svet za Slovenijo, NszS), whose aim was to establish a Slovenia independent of Yugoslavia. When he heard the news of fifth-column-led revolts within the flanking 4th Army, the commander of the 7th Army, Divizijski đeneral Dušan Trifunović was alarmed, and proposed withdrawal from the border areas, but this was rejected by the commander of the 1st Army Group, Armijski đeneral Milorad Petrović.

=== 7 April ===
In the early hours of 7 April, three Blenheims of the Yugoslav 8th Bomber Regiment took off from Rovine to bomb the railway junction at Feldbach, but became disoriented in bad weather. Only one aircraft found a target, bombing a bridge and road near Steyr before continuing on to Wiener Neustadt where it was hit by anti-aircraft fire and made an emergency landing.

Over the period 7–9 April, LI Infantry Corps held the lead elements of the 183rd and 132nd Infantry Divisions back to some extent while the rest of each division de-trained in Graz and made their way to the border. German forces along the front of the 7th Army continued to push towards Maribor and Dravograd on 7 April, against significant resistance from the 6th, 7th and 8th Border Regiments. The German thrusts towards Maribor broke through the Yugoslav defensive line Pesnica–Lenart–Sveta Trojica v Slovenskih Goricah–Kapelski Vrh, but those advancing towards Dravograd were held up by the 6th Border Regiment and a battalion of the 38th ID.

On the afternoon of 7 April, Trifunović again pressed Petrović to order a withdrawal from the border. Petrović accepted that this might become necessary if the situation on the immediate right flank of the 7th Army deteriorated further, but the idea was opposed by the chief of staff of the headquarters of the 1st Army Group, Armijski đeneral Leon Rupnik, who wryly suggested that Trifunović should personally lead night attacks to push the Germans back. At 19:30, the Yugoslav Supreme Command advised Petrović that he had approval to withdraw endangered units on the right wing of the 7th Army. Morale in the 7th Army started to decline due to fifth column elements encouraging soldiers to stop resisting the enemy.

=== 8 April ===
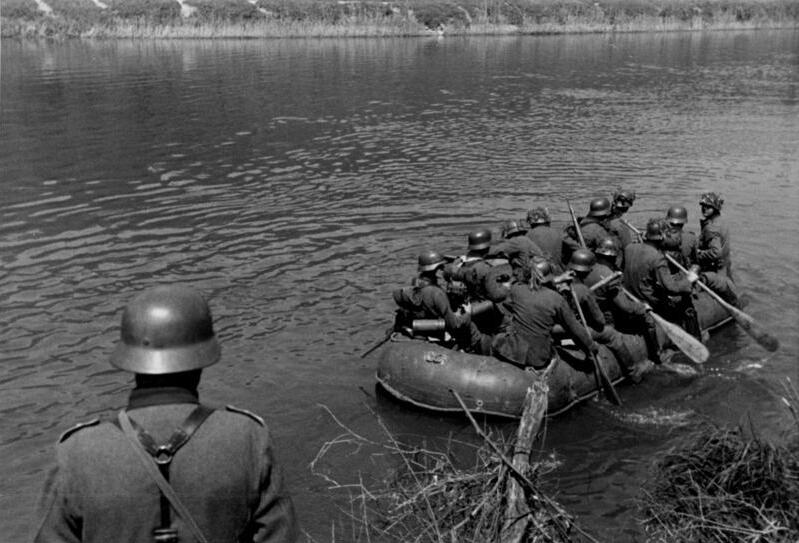
German soldiers crossing a river using an inflatable boat, similar to those used by Kampfgruppe Palten to cross the Pesnica river

On the night of 7/8 April, Petrović ordered Trifunović to begin to withdraw, first to a line through the Dravinja river, Zidani Most bridge and the right bank of the Krka river. Later in the day this was moved back to the line of the Kupa river. This ended the successful defence of the 38th ID and border guard units along the line of the Drava, and meant their withdrawal from Maribor. Disregarding orders from above, Palten exploited their withdrawal by leading his kampfgruppe south towards the town, and crossing the Pesnica river in inflatable boats, leaving his unit vehicles behind. In the evening, Palten and his force entered Maribor unopposed, taking 100 prisoners. For disregarding orders, Palten and his kampfgruppe were ordered to return to Spielfeld, and spent the rest of the invasion guarding the border. In the meantime, the forward elements of the two divisions consolidated their bridgeheads, with the 132nd Infantry Division securing Maribor, and the 183rd Infantry Division pushing past Murska Sobota, reaching Kapelski Vrh.

Some bridges over the Drava were blown before all elements of the 7th and 8th Border Regiments had withdrawn, but some soldiers were able to swim across, the rest being captured by the advancing Germans. German patrols reached the Drava at Ptuj, and further east at Ormož they found the bridge had been blown. Elements of the XXXXIX Mountain Corps had pushed forward to Poljana and Dravograd. The German troops received close air support from dive bombers and fighters during their advance, while medium bombers hit targets throughout the 7th Army area. The 4th Fighter Regiment clashed several times with German aircraft on 8 April without result. Three Blenheims of the Yugoslav 8th Bomber Regiment again flew a mission to attack a target in southern Austria, escorted by 4th Fighter Regiment Hurricanes, but the rest of the 8th Bomber Regiment was awaiting orders to bomb a rebelling Yugoslav regiment of the neighbouring 4th Army in Bjelovar – these orders were subsequently cancelled. The German orders for the following day were for LI Infantry Corps to force a crossing of the Drava near Varaždin on the right flank of the 38th ID and advance on Zagreb, while XXXXIX Mountain Corps were to drive towards Celje.

=== 9 April ===
On 9 April, the Germans continued their advance, and all elements of both divisions of LI Infantry Corps had finally unloaded in Graz. In the meantime, the 7th Army continued rapidly withdrawing its right wing, while withdrawing its centre more slowly. The 38th ID continued to withdraw south from Ptuj through Krapina towards Zagreb, while the Mountain Detachment Triglavski on its left flank fell back to the southern bank of the Krka river. Units of LI Infantry Corps crossed the Drava along the line Maribor–Ptuj and further east, and continued to expand their bridgehead south of Maribor. Elements of XXXXIX Mountain Corps expanded their bridgehead at Dravograd. German aircraft again attacked airfields in the rear area of the 7th Army.

As the activities of Natlačen and his NszS were continuing, the Yugoslav Supreme Command ordered their arrest. Rupnik and the head of the operations staff of the headquarters of the 1st Army Group, Pukovnik (Note: Equivalent to a U.S. Army colonel.) Franjo Nikolić, who were both Slovenes, hid the orders from Petrović and did not carry them out.

=== 10 April ===
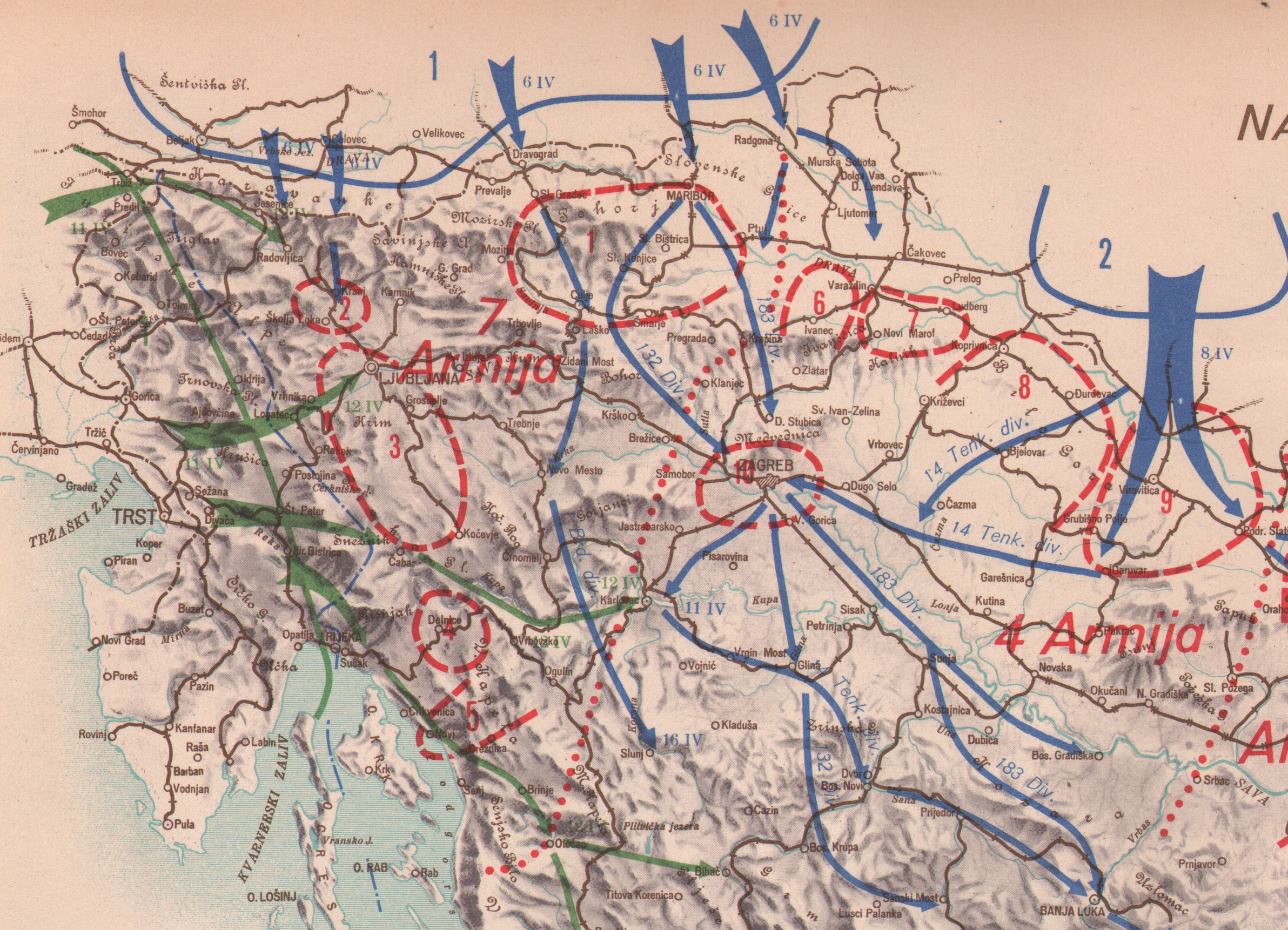
Crop of an official Yugoslav Government map illustrating Axis operations in the 7th Army area: 38th ID is marked by a red dashed shape with a 1; German attacks in blue; Italian attacks in green

On the evening of 9 April, Weichs ordered the XXXXVI Motorised Corps of General der Panzertruppe (Note: Equivalent to a U.S. Army lieutenant general.) Heinrich von Vietinghoff to break out of its bridgeheads in the 4th Army's sector the following day. The thrust from the Zákány bridgehead was to drive straight west to Zagreb then continue west to cut off the withdrawing 7th Army. This attack was led by Generalmajor Friedrich Kühn's 14th Panzer Division, supported by dive bombers, and was a resounding success. By 19:30 on 10 April, lead elements of the 14th Panzer Division had reached the outskirts of Zagreb, having covered nearly 160 kilometres (99 miles) in a single day. Before it arrived, the Ustaše, supported by German agents, had proclaimed the creation of the puppet Independent State of Croatia (Croatian: Nezavisna Država Hrvatska, NDH). When it entered Zagreb, the 14th Panzer Division was met by cheering crowds, and had captured 15,000 Yugoslav troops, including 22 generals.

In the 7th Army sector, about 09:45, the LI Infantry Corps began crossing the Drava, but construction of a bridge near Maribor was suspended because the river was in flood. Despite this, the 183rd Infantry Division managed to secure an alternative crossing point, and established a bridgehead. This crossing point was a partially destroyed bridge, guarded by a single platoon of the 1st Bicycle Battalion of Detachment Ormozki, the formation on the immediate right flank of the 38th ID. This crossing, combined with the withdrawal of the 38th ID from the line from Slovenska Bistrica–Ptuj, exposed the left flank of Detachment Ormozki. It attempted to withdraw south, but began to disintegrate during the night of 10/11 April.

That same night, the 1st Mountain Division, the most capable formation of XXXXIX Mountain Corps, had de-trained, crossed the border near Bleiburg, and advanced southeast towards Celje, reaching a point about 19 km (12 mi) from the town by evening. The rest of the XXXXIX Mountain Corps encountered little resistance, and by nightfall had reached the line Šoštanj–Mislinja. Luftwaffe reconnaissance sorties revealed that the main body of the 7th Army was withdrawing towards Zagreb, leaving behind light forces to maintain contact with the German bridgeheads. When it received this information, 2nd Army headquarters ordered LI Infantry Corps to form motorised columns to pursue the 7th Army south, but extreme weather conditions and flooding of the Drava at Maribor on 10 April slowed the German pursuit.

On 10 April, as the situation was becoming increasingly desperate throughout the country, Simović, who was both the Prime Minister and Chief of the General Staff, broadcast the following message:

All troops must engage the enemy wherever encountered and with every means at their disposal. Don't wait for direct orders from above, but act on your own and be guided by your judgement, initiative, and conscience.

During the night of 10/11 April, XXXXIX Mountain Corps was ordered to bridge the Savinja river at Celje, then advance towards Brežice on the Sava, and LI Infantry Corps was directed to link up with the 14th Panzer Division which would then drive west to Karlovac.

=== 11 April ===
On 11 April, Ustaše elements captured the staff of the 7th Army at Topusko and handed them over to the Germans shortly thereafter, and the 7th Army effectively ceased to exist as a formation. Chaos ensued throughout the 7th Army, whose Croat and Slovene soldiers could hear fifth column radio broadcasts telling them of their pending encirclement by the Germans and encouraging them to return to their homes and not fight against the invaders. This was reinforced by Natlačen and his NszS, who had distributed leaflets on the night of 10/11 April urging soldiers not to resist the Axis troops. To maintain public order, the NszS also formed a "Slovenian Legion" on 11 April, and encouraged Slovene nationalists among the 7th Army to join it. This force, split into a dozen units and totalling 2,000–3,000 men, then began to assist the Germans in disarming units of the 7th Army, but did not engage in combat with Yugoslav troops. The NszS authorised Natlačen to negotiate with the Germans for the creation of a Slovene client state along the lines of the NDH and the Slovak Republic, and Natlačen appointed the Ljubljana police chief Lovro Hacin to make contact with the Germans.

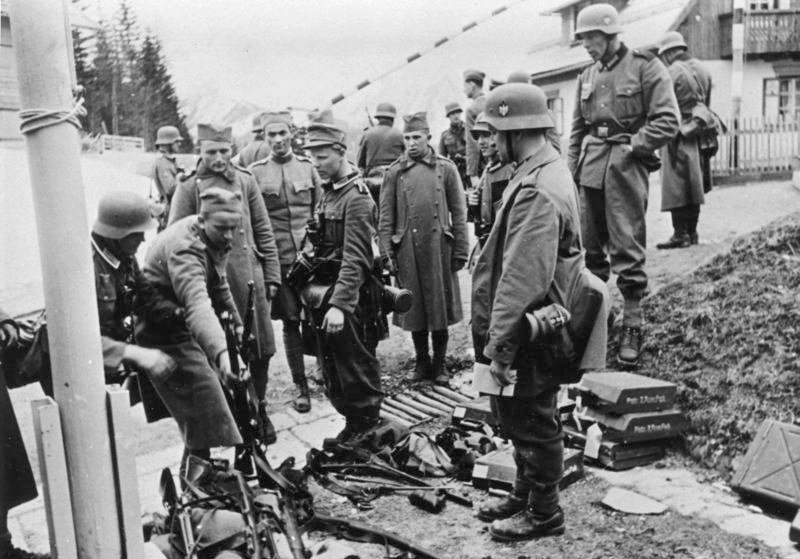
Surrendered Yugoslav troops handing in their weapons

Proxies for the NszS approached Generalmajor Hubert Lanz, the commander of the 1st Mountain Division, when his formation closed on Celje, but Lanz was not empowered to negotiate with civilians, and sought direction from higher headquarters. All German commanders were authorised to negotiate with the commanders of Yugoslav military formations so long as they agreed to surrender all weapons. Later that day, Lanz was authorised to meet with Natlačen the following day, and XXXXIX Mountain Corps took Celje. Held up by freezing weather and snow storms, LI Infantry Corps was approaching Zagreb from the north, and broke through a hastily established defensive line south of Ptuj between Pregrada and Krapina. Bicycle-mounted troops of the 183rd Infantry Division turned east to secure Ustaše-controlled Varaždin in the 4th Army sector. In the evening, LI Infantry Corps entered Zagreb and relieved the 14th Panzer Division but lead elements of that division had already thrust west from Zagreb into the rear of the withdrawing 7th Army and captured Karlovac.

Around 12:00, the Italians went over to the offensive against the formations of the 7th Army on the left flank of the 38th ID, with the 3rd Alpine Group tasked to advance to the line Selca–Radovljica, XI Corps to push via Logatec to Ljubljana, VI Corps to drive on Prezid, and V Corps to advance south from Fiume towards Kraljevica then Lokve. There was little significant resistance to the Italians, and by the end of the day they had captured Sušak, Bakar, Delnice, Jesenice, Vrhnika, Logatec and Ljubljana. To assist the Italian advance, the Luftwaffe attacked Yugoslav troops in the Ljubljana region. The Italians captured about 30,000 troops of the 7th Army waiting to surrender near Delnice. When the Italian 14th Infantry Division Isonzo entered Ljubljana, a delegate of the NszS greeted its commander, Generale di Divisione (Note: Equivalent to a U.S. Army major general.) Federico Romero, and symbolically handed him the keys to the city. An official reception was held for Romero that evening, attended by Natlačen and most of the members of the NszS, but because Natlačen and the council preferred that the Germans occupy Ljubljana, he asked Romero for permission to travel to Celje the following day to meet with Lanz.

== Fate ==
On 12 April, the 14th Panzer Division linked up with the Italians at Vrbovsko, closing the ring around the remnants of the 7th Army, which surrendered, and the 1st Mountain Division pushed through Novo Mesto and Črnomelj without facing resistance, reaching Vinice by the end of the day. At Celje, Lanz received a delegation led by Natlačen which included Andrej Gosar. The meeting was very formal and cold, as Lanz had already received orders regarding the break-up of the Drava Banovina into Italian and German-controlled territories, and the council and its goal of an independent Slovenia were superfluous from a German perspective.

Remnants of the 4th Army conducted a fighting withdrawal through Bosnia towards Sarajevo over the following days, pursued by the 14th Panzer Division and elements of LI Infantry Corps but a ceasefire was declared at noon on 15 April. After a delay in locating appropriate signatories for the surrender document, the Yugoslav Supreme Command unconditionally surrendered in Belgrade effective at 12:00 on 18 April. Yugoslavia was then occupied and dismembered by the Axis powers, with Germany, Italy, Hungary, Bulgaria and Albania all annexing parts of its territory. Most of the Slovene members of the division and all ethnic Germans taken as prisoners of war were soon released by the Axis powers, as 90 per cent of those held for the duration of the war were Serbs.

== Footnotes ==
=== Books ===
- Brayley, Martin; Chappell, Mike (2001). British Army 1939–45 (1): North-West Europe. Oxford, United Kingdom: Osprey Publishing. ISBN 978-1-84176-052-0.
- Figa, Jozef (2004). "Framing the Conflict: Slovenia in Search of Her Army". Civil-Military Relations, Nation Building, and National Identity: Comparative Perspectives. Westport, Connecticut: Praeger. ISBN 978-0-313-04645-2.
- Hoptner, J.B. (1963). Yugoslavia in Crisis, 1934–1941. New York: Columbia University Press. OCLC 404664.
- Ramet, Sabrina P. (2006). The Three Yugoslavias: State-Building and Legitimation, 1918–2005. Bloomington, Indiana: Indiana University Press. ISBN 978-0-253-34656-8.
- Shores, Christopher F.; Cull, Brian; Malizia, Nicola (1987). Air War for Yugoslavia, Greece, and Crete, 1940–41. London: Grub Street. ISBN 978-0-948817-07-6.
- Terzić, Velimir (1982). Slom Kraljevine Jugoslavije 1941: Uzroci i posledice poraza [The Collapse of the Kingdom of Yugoslavia in 1941: Causes and Consequences of Defeat] (in Serbo-Croatian). Vol. 2. Belgrade: Narodna knjiga. OCLC 10276738.
- Tomasevich, Jozo (1975). War and Revolution in Yugoslavia, 1941–1945: The Chetniks. Stanford, California: Stanford University Press. ISBN 978-0-8047-0857-9.
- Tomasevich, Jozo (2001). War and Revolution in Yugoslavia, 1941–1945: Occupation and Collaboration. Stanford, California: Stanford University Press. ISBN 978-0-8047-3615-2.
- Trevor-Roper, Hugh (1964). Hitler's War Directives: 1939–1945. London: Sidgwick and Jackson. OCLC 852024357.
- U.S. Army (1986) [1953]. The German Campaigns in the Balkans (Spring 1941). Washington, D.C.: United States Army Center of Military History. OCLC 16940402. CMH Pub 104-4. Archived from the original on 19 June 2009.

=== Journals and papers ===
- Barefield, Michael R. (May 1993). "Overwhelming Force, Indecisive Victory: The German Invasion of Yugoslavia, 1941" (PDF). Fort Leavenworth, Kansas: School of Advanced Military Studies, United States Army Command and General Staff College. OCLC 32251055. Archived (PDF) from the original on 29 April 2017.
- Stanojlović, Čedomir (1981). "Excerpt from Čedomir Stanojlović's memoirs". The South Slav Journal. 4. ISSN 0141-6146.
- Krzak, Andrzej (2006). "Operation 'Marita': The Attack Against Yugoslavia in 1941". The Journal of Slavic Military Studies. 19 (3): 543–600. doi:10.1080/13518040600868123. ISSN 1351-8046. S2CID 219625930.
- Zajac, Daniel L. (May 1993). "The German Invasion of Yugoslavia: Insights For Crisis Action Planning And Operational Art in A Combined Environment" (PDF). Fort Leavenworth, Kansas: School of Advanced Military Studies, United States Army Command and General Staff College. OCLC 32251097. Archived (PDF) from the original on 13 December 2016.

=== Websites ===
- Niehorster, Leo (2018a). "Royal Yugoslavian Army Infantry Division 6th April 1941". Leo Niehorster.
- Niehorster, Leo (2018b). "Royal Yugoslav Armed Forces Ranks". Leo Niehorster.
- Niehorster, Leo (2018c). "Royal Italian Land Forces Ranks". Leo Niehorster.
- Niehorster, Leo (2018d). "German Army and Waffen-SS Ranks". Leo Niehorster.
