= Dušan Trifunović =

General Dušan Trifunović
- Душан Трифуновић
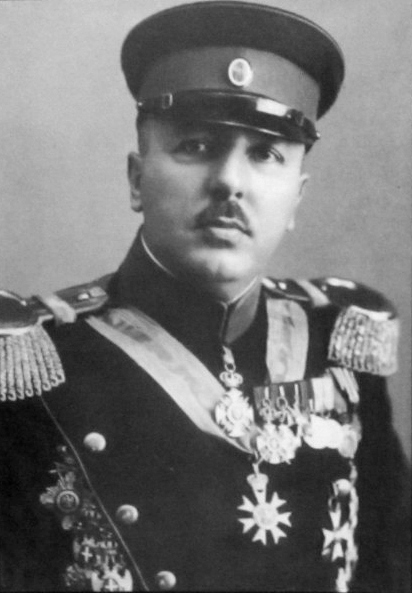
- Born: 1 March 1880; Svilajnac, Principality of Serbia
- Died: 28 February 1942 (aged 61); Nuremberg, Nazi Germany
- Military career
- Allegiance: Yugoslavia
- Branch: Royal Yugoslav Army
- Rank: Divisional General
- Commands: 7th Army
- Conflicts: Invasion of Yugoslavia (1941) (POW)

Dušan Trifunović (1 March 1880 – 28 February 1942) was a divisional general (Note: Serbian: Diviziski General was equivalent to a United States major general.) in the Royal Yugoslav Army who commanded the 7th Army (Note: The Royal Yugoslav Army did not field corps, but their armies consisted of several divisions, and were therefore corps-sized.) during the German-led Axis invasion of Yugoslavia of April 1941 during World War II. Trifunović's command consisted of one division, one divisional-strength mountain detachment, two brigade-strength mountain detachments and a brigade-strength infantry detachment. The 7th Army was responsible for the defence of the northwestern border with Italy and the Third Reich.
