= 3rd Alpine Group =

The 3rd Alpine Group was a formation of the Royal Italian Army manned by Alpini troops that participated in the Axis invasion of Yugoslavia during World War II.
