= Savci =

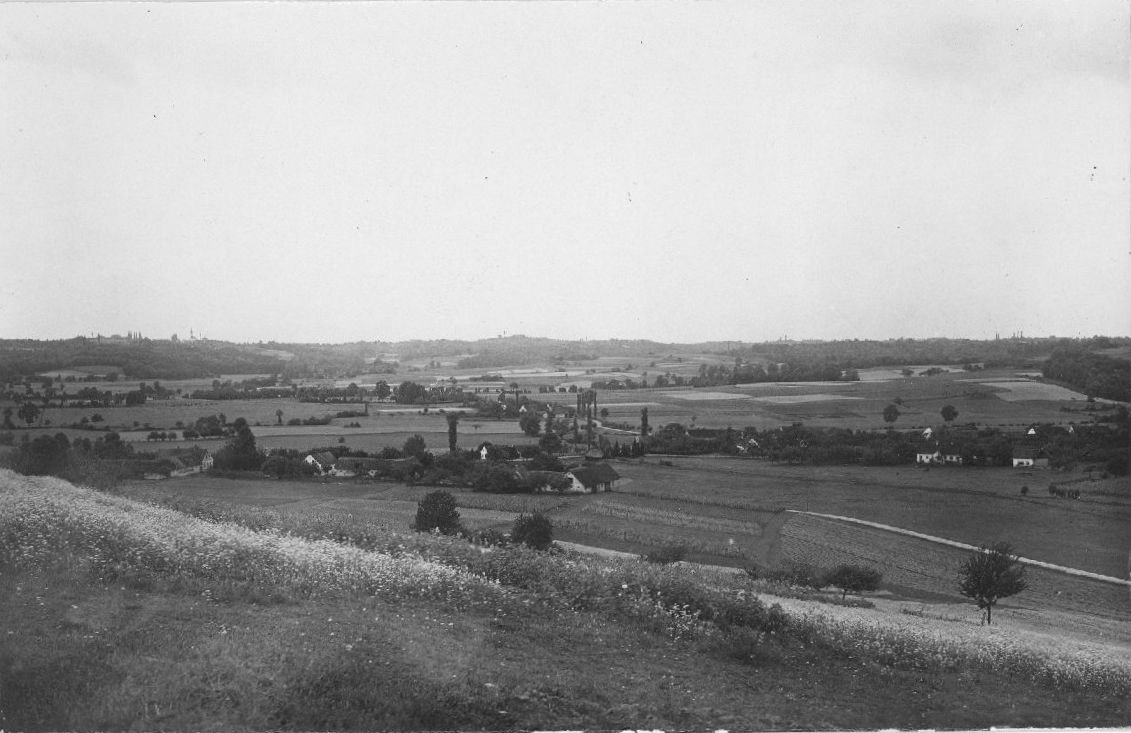
- Postcard of Savci

- Location in Slovenia
- Coordinates: 46°28′31.09″N 16°2′42.31″E
- Country: Slovenia
- Traditional region: Styria
- Statistical region: Drava
- Municipality: Sveti Tomaž

Area
  - Total: 5.87 km^{2} (2.27 sq mi)
- Elevation: 225.2 m (739 ft)

Population (2002)
  - Total: 241

Savci (pronounced [ˈsaːu̯tsi]) is a settlement in the Slovene Hills (Slovene: Slovenske gorice) in the Municipality of Sveti Tomaž in northeastern Slovenia. The area is part of the traditional region of Styria and is now included in the Drava Statistical Region.

The village chapel with a belfry was built in 1895.

== Notable people ==
Notable people that were born or lived in Savci include:

- Stanko Cajnkar (1900–1977), writer
