= Hlavče Njive =

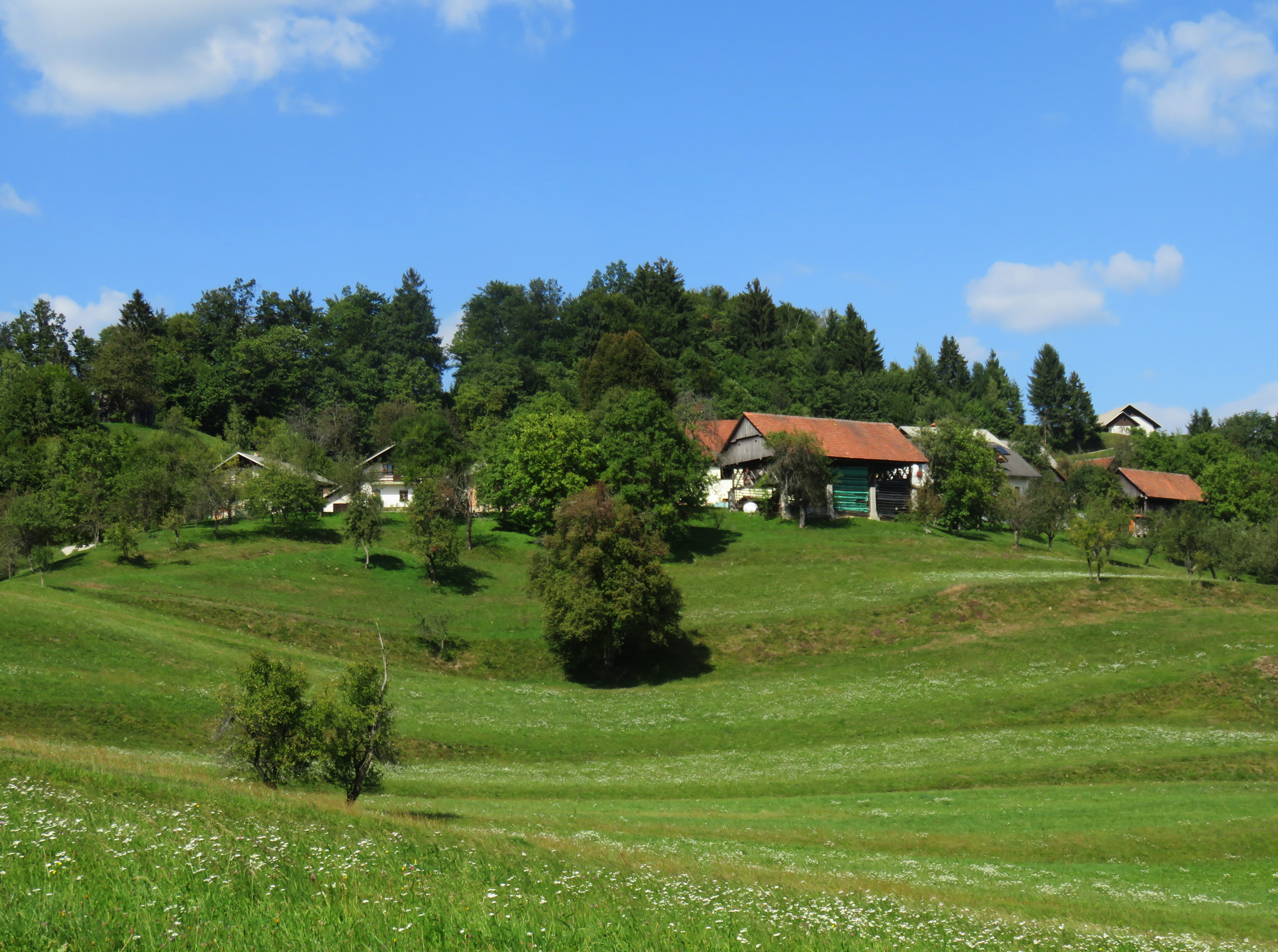

- Location in Slovenia
- Coordinates: 46°7′6.73″N 14°7′52.26″E
- Country: Slovenia
- Traditional region: Upper Carniola
- Statistical region: Upper Carniola
- Municipality: Gorenja Vas–Poljane
- Elevation: 633.6 m (2,079 ft)

Population (2020)
  - Total: 66

Hlavče Njive (pronounced [ˈxlaːu̯tʃɛ ˈnjiːʋɛ]) is a small settlement in the hills above the Poljane Sora Valley in the Municipality of Gorenja Vas–Poljane in the Upper Carniola region of Slovenia.

== Name ==
Hlavče Njive was attested in historical sources as Qualtsemb in 1291 and Chlapscheniue in 1500. Etymologically, the name means 'servants' fields', referring to a feudal arrangement, from hlapec 'demesne servant' (cf. Chlap-sche in the 1500 attestation) + njive (plural of njiva 'tilled field').
