= Vrh Svetih Treh Kraljev =

Vrh Svetih Treh Kraljev Vrh nad Rovtami (1952–1992)
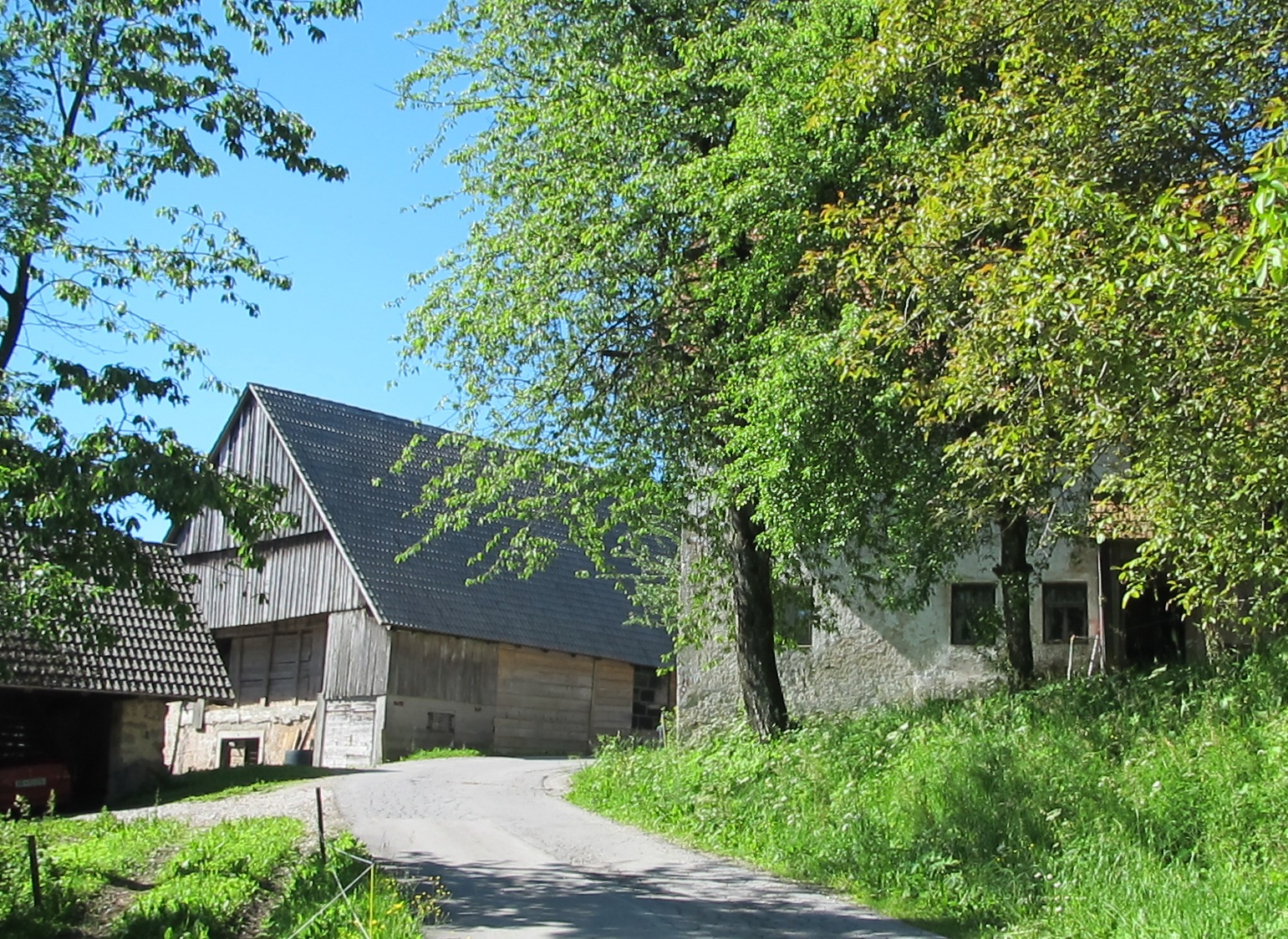

- Location in Slovenia
- Coordinates: 46°0′44″N 14°10′22.36″E
- Country: Slovenia
- Traditional region: Inner Carniola
- Statistical region: Central Slovenia
- Municipality: Logatec

Area
  - Total: 2.09 km^{2} (0.81 sq mi)
- Elevation: 825.7 m (2,709 ft)

Population (2002)
  - Total: 47

Vrh Svetih Treh Kraljev (pronounced [ˈʋəɾx ˈsʋeːtix ˈtɾeːx ˈkɾaːljɛu̯], in older sources simply Vrh, German: Werch) is a dispersed settlement in the hills north of Rovte in the Municipality of Logatec in the Inner Carniola region of Slovenia.

== Name ==
The name of the settlement was changed from Vrh Svetih Treh Kraljev (literally, 'Three Kings’ Peak') to Vrh nad Rovtami (literally, 'Peak above Rovte') in 1952. The name was changed on the basis of the 1948 Law on Names of Settlements and Designations of Squares, Streets, and Buildings as part of efforts by Slovenia's postwar communist government to remove religious elements from toponyms. The name Vrh Svetih Treh Kraljev was restored in 1992.

== Church ==
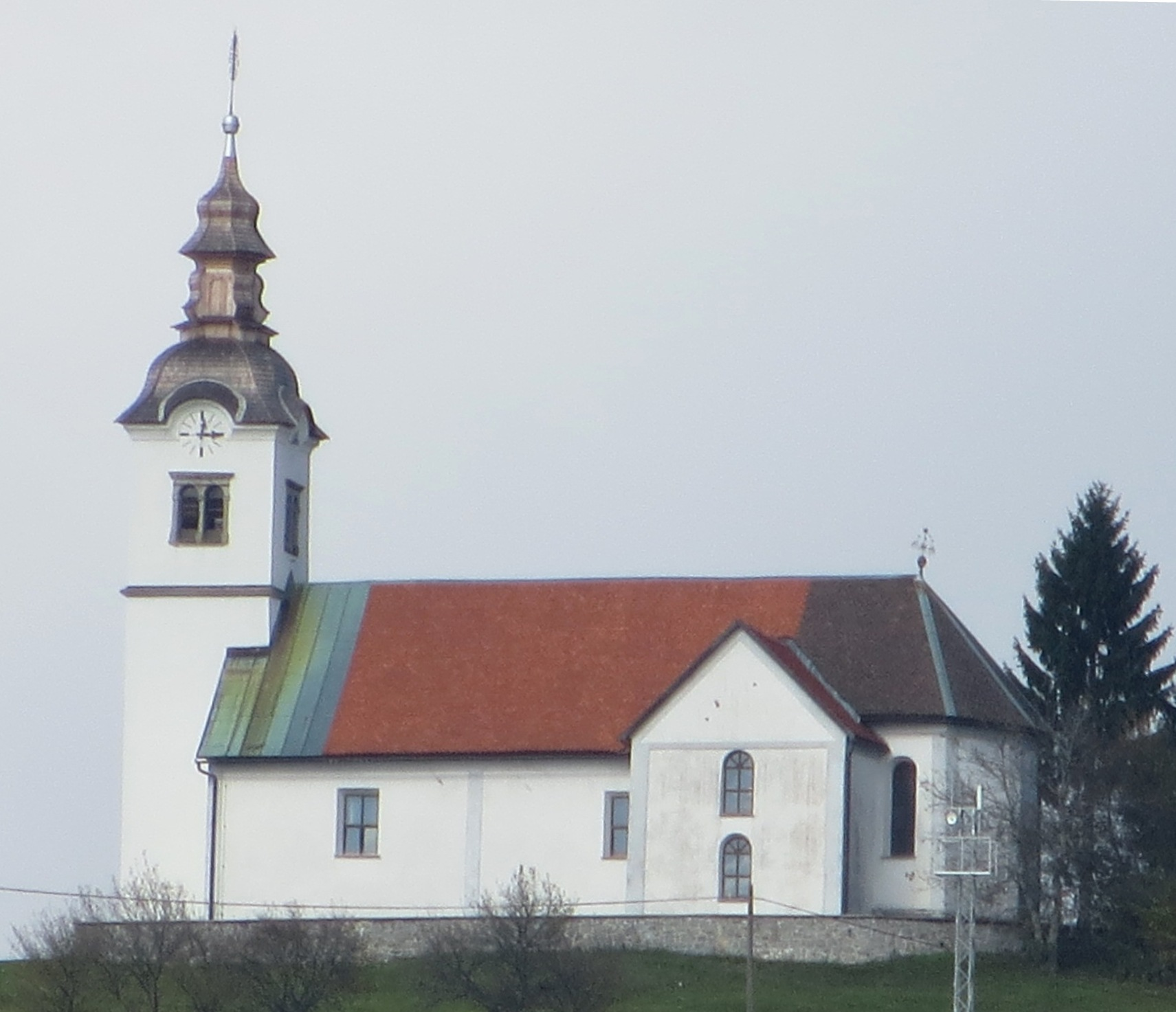
Three Kings Church

On top of a hill to the south of the settlement is the landmark parish church from which the settlement gets its name. It is dedicated to the Three Kings (Slovene: Sveti Trije Kralji) and belongs to the Ljubljana Archdiocese. The church was built in 1698. It formerly contained a 15th-century statue of the Virgin Mary, which is now kept at the National Gallery of Slovenia. Its marble altar is believed to have been brought here from the monastic complex in Bistra.

== Cultural heritage ==
In addition to Three Kings' Church, several other structures in Vrh Svetih Treh Kraljev have protected cultural monument status:

- A closed chapel-shrine stands near the Peterček farm at house no. 6 in the village. It has an arched niche, a steep triangular pediment, and a tile roof. The interior contains a partially vaulted altar area and a wooden statue of Saint Anthony the Hermit.
- The rectory is a two-story building with a symmetrical half-hipped roof. It has a stone door casing bearing the year 1897. It is an unnumbered building standing south of Three Kings' Church.
- The village cemetery lies north of Three Kings' Church on the rise known as Three Kings' Peak (Slovene: Vrh Treh kraljev). It is a walled cemetery with metal gates, a simple funeral chapel, and a large wooden crucifix. A memorial to the Home Guard soldiers killed after the Second World War was erected in 1993.
- The farm at house no. 1 consists of a stone house built into the hill with an arched stone door casing bearing the year 1841 and a votive niche above this, a barn with a loft covered with a steep gabled roof, and a double hayrack with a votive niche in its stone column. It stands along the road to Three Kings' Peak, east of Jereb Hill (Slovene: Jerebov grič).
- The farm at house no. 4 consists of a house built above a cellar with two dormers above the main entrance. It has a symmetrical gabled tiled roof and dates from the beginning of the 20th century. There is also a double hayrack with stone columns. The farm stands below the road to Three Kings' Peak, east of Three Kings' Church.
- The farm at house no. 6 is built above a cellar and has the year 1862 carved into its wooden door casing. The wooden fanlight above the door has carvings depicting the Flight into Egypt. The farm also has a partially stone barn and a single hayrack. It stands along the road east of Three Kings' Church.
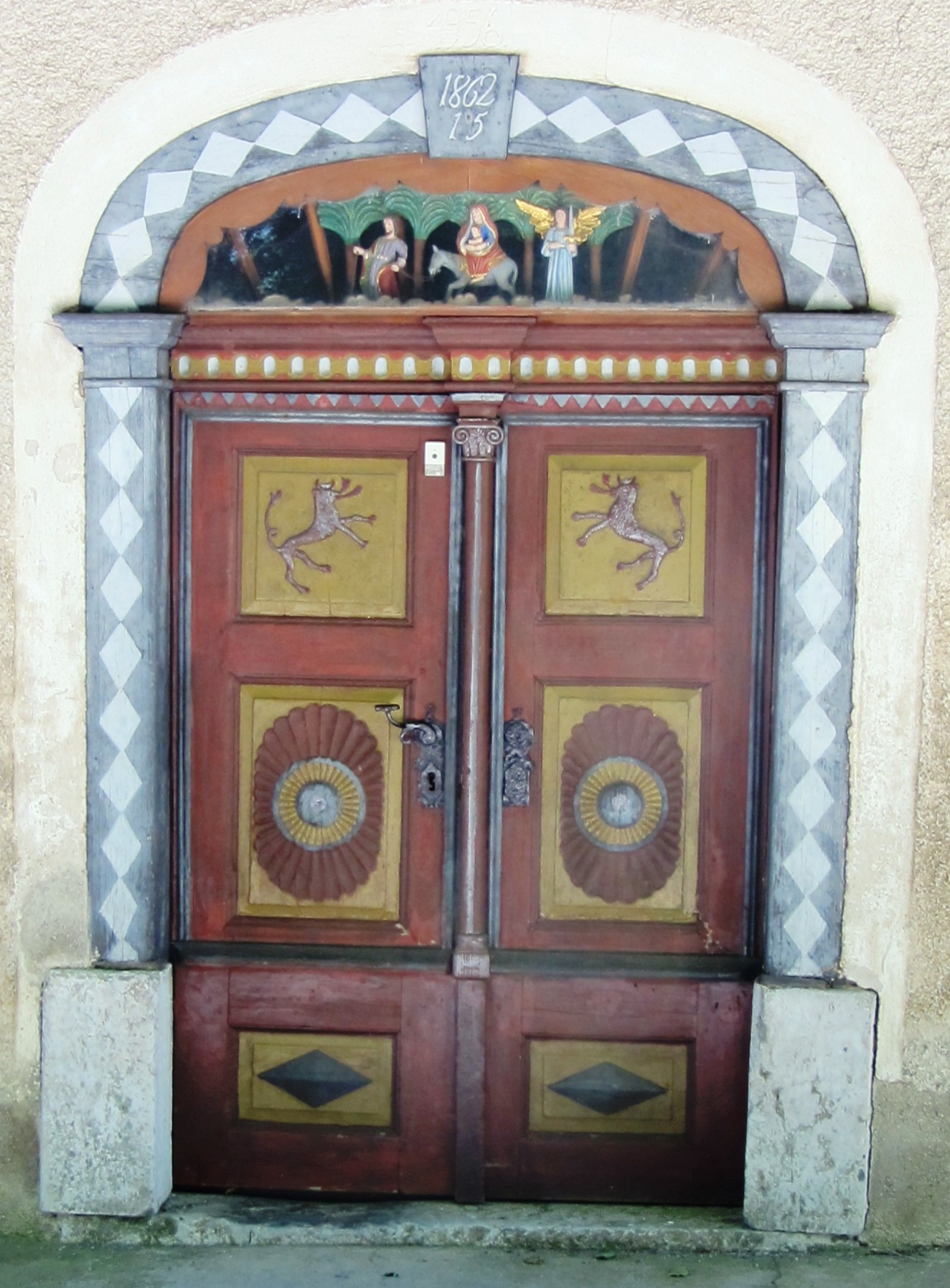
Door casing on house no. 6 with the Flight into Egypt motif

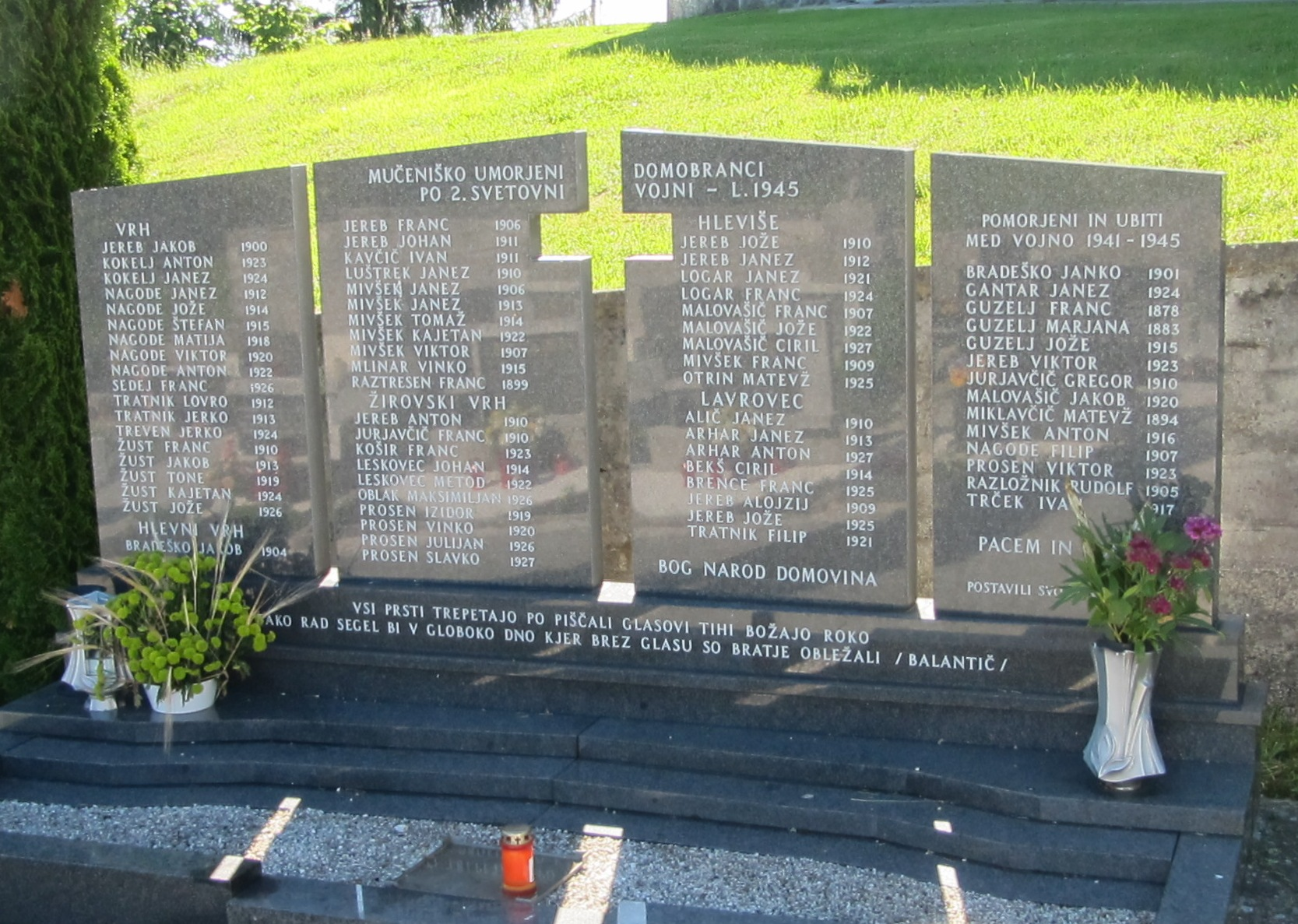
Home Guard memorial in the village cemetery

== Notable people ==
Notable people that were born or lived in Vrh Svetih Treh Kraljev include:

- Jernej Jereb (1838–1929), sculptor and painter
