= Lašče, Borovnica =

Lašče
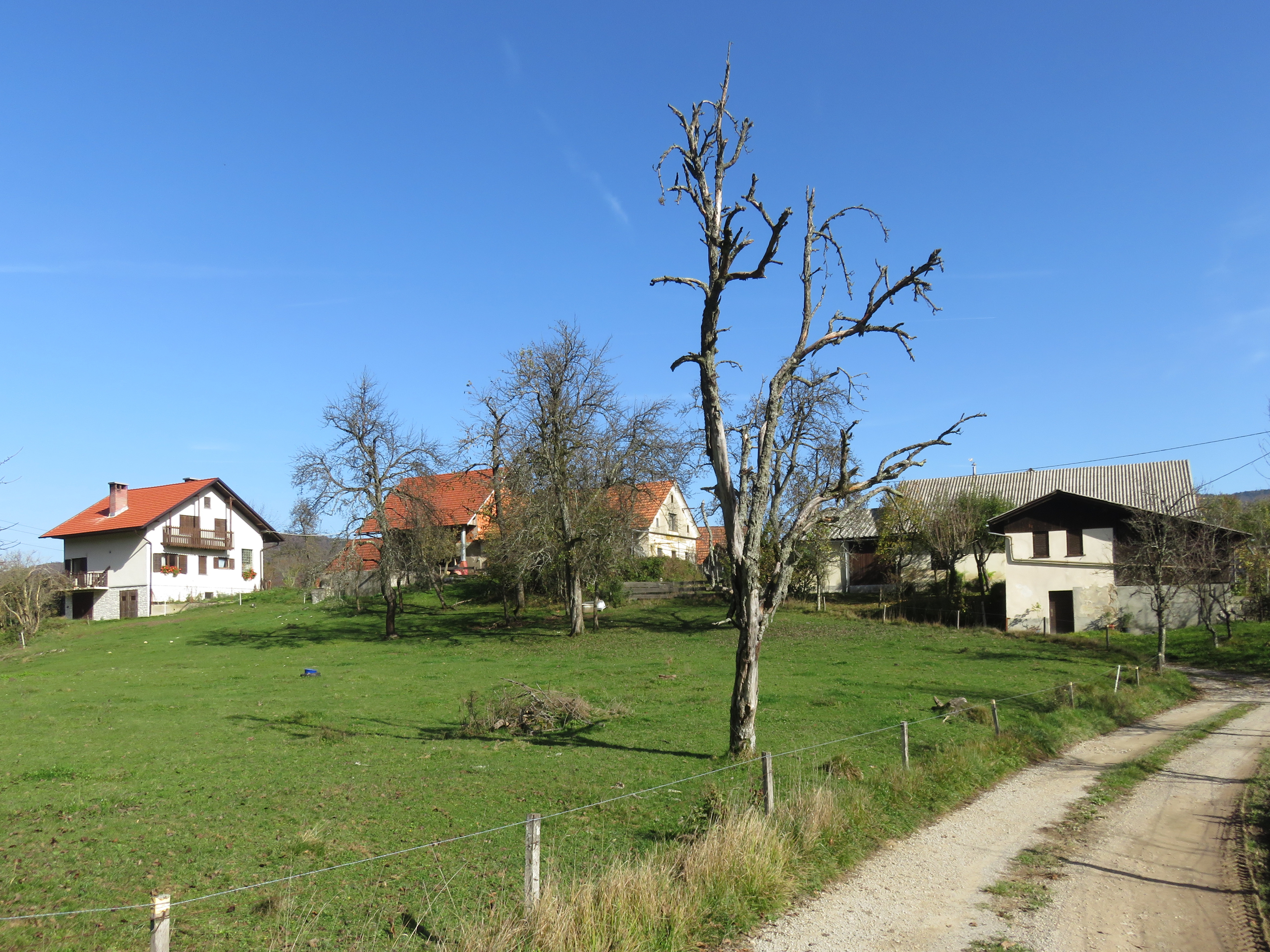

- Location in Slovenia
- Coordinates: 45°53′53.54″N 14°22′6.67″E
- Country: Slovenia
- Traditional region: Inner Carniola
- Statistical region: Central Slovenia
- Municipality: Borovnica

Area
  - Total: 0.54 km^{2} (0.21 sq mi)
- Elevation: 492.4 m (1,615 ft)

Population (2020)
  - Total: 1
  - Density: 1.9/km^{2} (4.8/sq mi)

Lašče (pronounced [ˈlaːʃtʃɛ]) is a small settlement in the hills south of Borovnica in the Inner Carniola region of Slovenia. It no longer has any permanent residents.
