= Rupnik Line =

Yugoslav defensive line built 1937–1941

- Rupnikova linija
- Carniola, Carinthia, Styria, Gorski Kotar, Croatian Littoral
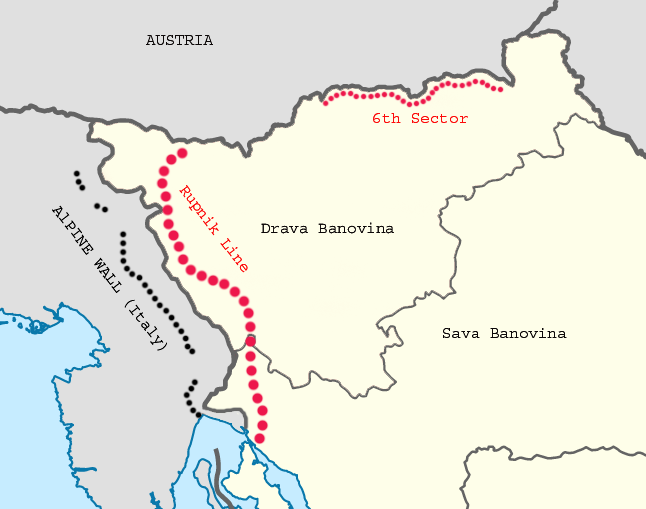

Site information
- Type: Defensive line
- Controlled by: Slovenia, Croatia
- Open to the public: Yes

Site history
- Built: 1937–1941
- Built by: Leon Rupnik
- In use: 1941
- Materials: Concrete, steel, iron
- Battles/wars: World War II: Invasion of Yugoslavia (1941)

The Rupnik Line (Slovene: Rupnikova linija), was a line of World War II–era fortifications and weapons installations that Yugoslavia constructed along its terrestrial western and northern border. The construction of the line, named after General Leon Rupnik, was a safety measure taken in order to counter the construction of the Italian Alpine Wall, a line built by the bordering country Italy, as well as against the imposing danger of a German invasion following the Anschluss of Austria.

Yugoslavia's Rupnik Line was inspired by various other fortification systems built along borders, mainly by France, Czechoslovakia and neighboring Italy. It was established to provide good positions to enforce the existing border, as well as to repel a potential invasion.

Although there were around 15,000 troops manning the fortifications at its peak, with a potential of housing a total of 40,000, the line was never used to full potential, as it was largely unprepared and abandoned by the time Yugoslavia was invaded in April 1941.

== Planning and construction ==
The idea of building fortifications along the Italian border with Yugoslavia emerged in 1935, to counter the construction of the Alpine Wall amidst gradual worsening of relations between the two states. In 1936 a decree was passed officially to begin designing the new fortification system along the border. The construction itself only began in 1937 or 1938. Such a large-scale operation significantly decreased the effects of ongoing economic crisis in the region, as well as boosted living standards, as the state employed around 15,000 workers at the beginning, with the number increasing to around 60,000 workers of whom approximately 40,000 were army reservists at the peak in 1941. Around 4,000 bunkers and bunker complexes were finished or partially built before the Axis invasion.

== Organisation ==
The Yugoslav leadership had few experiences in planning large-scale defence positions, so the defence line was largely inspired by various similar French complexes, mainly the Maginot Line.

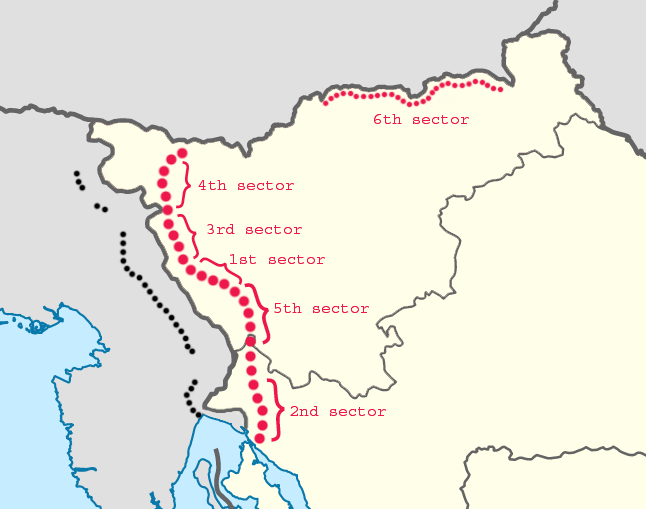
Sectors of Rupnik defense line.

The plan envisaged two parallel lines of bunkers to be built, with all of them interconnected. There was no effort to conceal the positions, in order to potentially enhance the psychological effect it might have on the opposing side.

The whole line was divided into 6 sectors, with sectors numbered lower having higher importance;

1st sector: Most vital position, Postojna Gate is a passing which allows lowest crossing of Dinaric Alps.

2nd sector: Its role was to protect Dalmatia from being invaded

3rd sector: Served as border enhancement between Škofja Loka and Vrhnika.

4th sector: Protection of Selca Valley.

5th sector: Border enhancement between Čabar and Cerknica.

6th sector: Its construction commenced after the Anschluss in Austria, was to serve against a possible invasion through Austrian territory. Located between Gornja Radgona and Dravograd

=== Parallel lines of defence ===
The positions were further divided into two primary lines of defence;

1st line of defence: This being the front part of the defence complex, it composed of machinegun bunkers various shapes and sizes, the most often built shape being a tower.

Artillery line: This line consisted of anti-tank, barrier, ridge and casemate fortifications. Ridge fortifications were among the largest, as some were planned to enable navigating through main corridors with motorised transport.

== Axis invasion in World War II ==
The line was inadequately prepared for the Axis invasion that took place in April 1941, as its construction was expected to conclude in 1947. The Yugoslav military budget was largely exhausted by the time of the invasion, and both attacking forces had a superior military force. As a consequence, the line was poorly defended and largely abandoned during the incursion of Italy and Germany. Part of the 6th sector near Dravograd managed to hold positions for three days before abandoning the outposts. Other notable cases of resistance were on April 8 on Mount Blegoš, Gozd–Martuljek and in Kastav near Rijeka on April 9. Some forces managed to push back the invaders to Cerkno, but ultimately retreated.

Many of the objects in the Italian-annexed zone were destroyed to prevent use by enemy Partisans as well as to get to the much needed metals located in the walls of these fortifications.

== After World War II ==
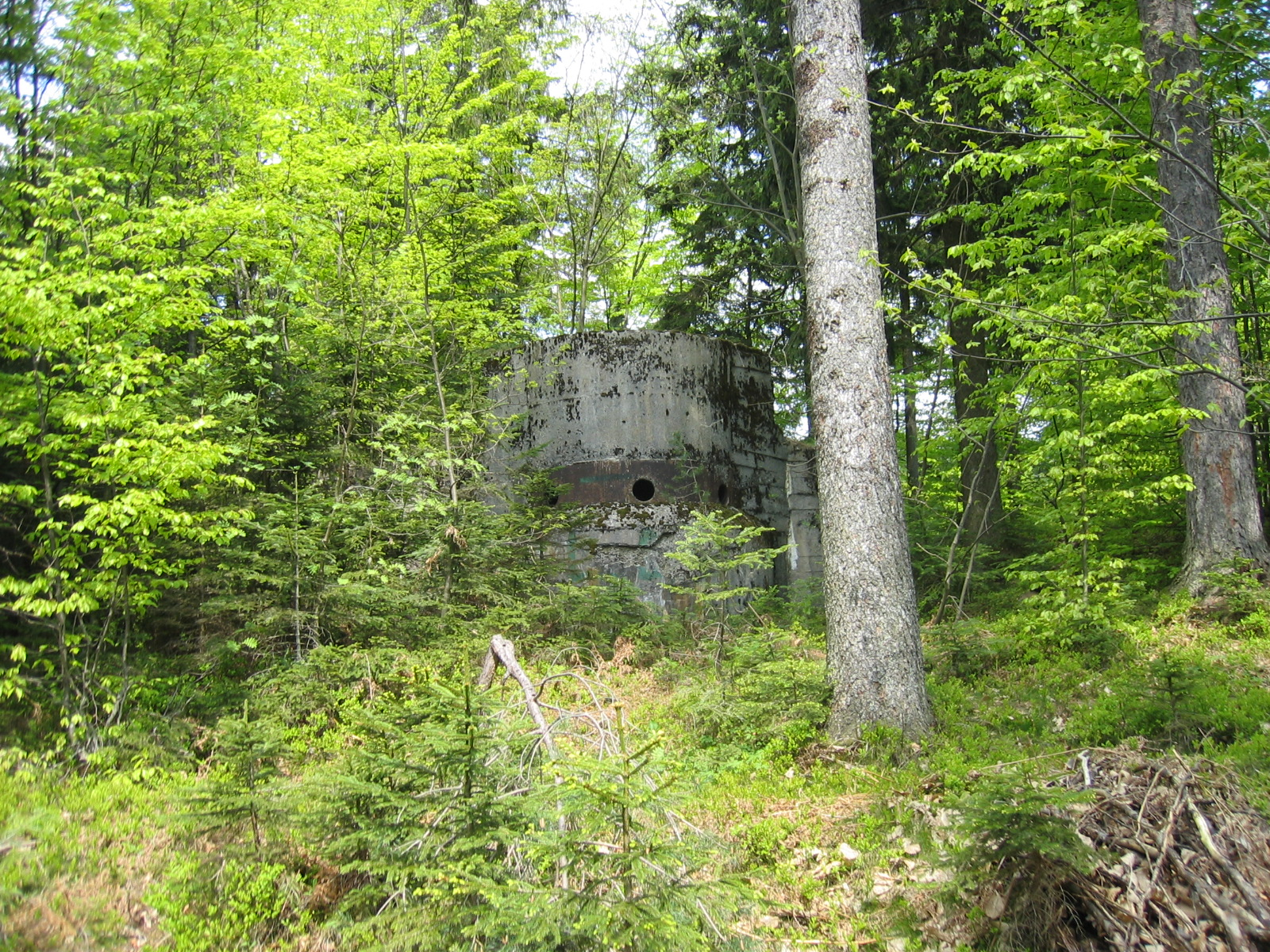
One of the remaining bunkers on the Rupnik line

All of the fortifications remained in the territory of socialist Yugoslavia after the war. The majority of the buildings were abandoned, save for a few used by the armed forces. Following the breakup of Yugoslavia the line gained recognition and a thematic trail for tourists was established, though the area is still administered by the Ministry of Defense. Fortifications at Goli Vrh and Hrast Hill are being renovated for tourist services.

== See also ==
- Alpine Wall
- Maginot Line
- Czechoslovak border fortifications
- Metaxas Line
- Siegfried Line

== Bibliography ==
- Potočnik J., Aleksander: Fortifying Europe's Soft Underbelly, Merriam Press, Bennington VT, 2010.
- Potočnik J., Aleksander: Rupnikova linija, odkrivanje utrdb ob rapalski meji, Ad Pirum, Logatec, 2009.
- Potočnik J., Aleksander: Utrdbe na Slovenskem / Slovenian fortifications, Ad Pirum, Logatec, 2008.
- Habrnál, Miloš: Rupnikova črta in druge jugoslovanske utrdbe iz obdobja 1926-1941, J. Škoda - Fortprint, Dvůr Králové nad Labem, 2005
- Potočnik J., Aleksander: Rupnikova linija in Alpski zid, utrjevanje Rapalske meje med letoma 1932 in 1941, Galerija 2, Vrhnika, 2004.
- Jankovič (Potočnik), Aleksander: La ligne Rupnik. Histoire d'une ligne fortifiée yougoslave et ce qu'il en reste, 39/45 Magazine, no 207, Editions Heimdal, Bayeux, 2003
- Jankovič (Potočnik), Aleksander: The Rupnik Line – Yugoslavia's western front, FORT Journal, no 29, FSG, 2001
