= Žabjak, Radenci =

Žabjak
- Location in Slovenia
- Coordinates: 46°38′12″N 16°00′34″E
- Country: Slovenia
- Traditional region: Styria
- Statistical region: Mura
- Municipality: Radenci
- Elevation: 240 m (790 ft)

Žabjak (pronounced [ˈʒaːbjak], German: Krottendorf) is a former village in northeastern Slovenia in the Municipality of Radenci. It is now part of the village of Boračeva. It is part of the traditional region of Styria and is now included in the Mura Statistical Region.

== Geography ==
Žabjak lies southwest of the village center of Boračeva on the edge of the Mura Basin. It is a scattered settlement below the neighboring village of Janžev Vrh.

== Name ==
The name Žabjak is derived from the Slovene common noun žaba 'frog'. This is also the basis of similar Slovene toponyms such as Žabnica, Žabče, Žablje, and Žabja vas, referring to a damp place where frogs lived.

== History ==
Žabjak ceased to exist as a separate settlement in 1949, when it was annexed by Boračeva.
