= Kocjan =

Kocjan may refer to:

== People ==
- Antoni Kocjan (1902–1944), Polish glider constructor
- Jure Kocjan (born 1984), Slovenian road cyclist
- Krysia Kocjan (born 1984), Scottish folk singer

== Places ==
- Kocjan, Radenci, Slovenia
- Zgornji Kocjan, Slovenia
- Spodnji Kocjan, Slovenia

== See also ==
- Kocian
- Kocijan
- Kocyan
- Kóczián
