= Kotzian =

Kotzian is a surname. Notable people with the surname include:

- Ditte Kotzian (born 1979), German diver
- Monika Kotzian (fl. 2019), Polish para-snowboarder
- Tom Kotzian, German politician

== See also ==
- Kocian
- Kocjan (disambiguation)
- Kocyan
