= 2025 in Europe =

This is a list of events that have taken or will take place in Europe in 2025.

== Incumbents ==
=== European Union ===
- Presidency of the Council of the EU:
  - Poland (January–June)
  - Denmark (July–December)

== Events ==
- January 1
  - Poland assumes the Presidency of the Council of the European Union from Hungary.
  - Bulgaria and Romania complete the process of joining the Schengen Area, lifting land border controls.
  - Liechtenstein becomes the 39th country in the world to legalize same-sex marriage.
  - Ukraine halts the transportation of Russian gas supplies through the country, following the expiration of a five-year transit deal.
  - Ukraine becomes a state party in the International Criminal Court.
- January 1–February 1 – 2025 Slovak–Ukraine gas dispute
- January 3
  - United Kingdom is under multiple weather warnings, such as an amber warning for snow in northern England and a yellow ice warning in Scotland, followed with a yellow snow warning on Sunday, 5 January also for Scotland.
- January 8–February 2 – The 2025 World Men's Handball Championship is held in Croatia, Denmark and Norway.
- January 12 – 2024–25 Croatian presidential election (second round): Incumbent president Zoran Milanović wins a second term in office with 74% of the vote.
- January 30 – The 2025 Southeast Europe retail boycotts occur, over inflation.
- February 9 – 2025 Liechtenstein general election is held.
- February 9 – February 2025 Kosovan parliamentary election is held.
- February 23 – 2025 German federal election is held.
- February 26 – In Bosnia and Herzegovina, a court in Sarajevo convicts Milorad Dodik, the President of Republika Srpska, for disobeying the High Representative for Bosnia and Herzegovina, and sentences him to one year's imprisonment and a ban on engaging in political activities for six years.
- March 1 – In Romania, tens of thousands gather at an AUR protest in Bucharest in support of Călin Georgescu and against the annulment of the 2024 Romanian presidential election.
- March 8–March 17 – 2025 Special Olympics World Winter Games in Turin.
- March 9 – The Romanian Central Electoral Bureau rejects Călin Georgescu's candidacy for the 2025 Romanian presidential election, citing his failure to comply with electoral regulations that contributed to the annulment of the 2024 Romanian presidential election.
- March 15 – The Romanian Central Electoral Bureau rejects Diana Iovanovici Șoșoacă's candidacy for the 2025 Romanian presidential election. She becomes the second Far Right candidate to be excluded from running.
- March 27 – 2025 Amsterdam stabbing attack
- March 31 – In France, Marine Le Pen from the National Rally (RN) is banned from running for political office for five years, meaning she cannot stand in the 2027 French presidential election.
- April 9 –
  - In Germany, The CDU announces a coalition agreement with the SPD at the federal level.
  - The Alternative for Germany AfD finishes as the leading party for the first time in opinion polling.
- April 14 – The Hungarian Parliament passes constitutional amendments outlawing public events by the LGBTQ+ community. The amendments will also protect the "right to use cash", and mandate the existence of only two genders (male or female).
- May 2 – The German Federal Office for the Protection of the Constitution designates the German Alternative for Germany AfD party as a right-wing extremist organisation.
- May 5 – The AfD sues the Federal Office for the Protection of Constitution, accusing it of violating the German constitution by trying to prosecute AfD for statements which are considered freedom of speech and legitimate criticism of German immigration policies.
- May 6 to 12 – 2025 papal conclave will be held.
- May 20 – the Hungarian National Assembly approves a bill to initiate the country's withdrawal from the International Criminal Court (ICC), making Hungary the first European Union member state to take such action.
- May 11 – 2025 Albanian parliamentary election was held.
- 4/18 May – 2025 Romanian presidential election was held.
- May 18 – 2025 Polish presidential election was held.
- July 17 – The Slovenia government designates Israeli National Security Minister Itamar Ben Gvir and Finance Minister Bezalel Smotrich "persona non grata" over their role in human rights violations against Palestinians. a first in the European Union.
- July 30 – The Slovenia government announces a complete ban on the import, export, and transit of arms and military equipment to and from Israel over its actions in the Gaza War. a first in the European Union.
- September 8 – 2025 Norwegian parliamentary election was held.
- September 26 – The National Council of Slovakia passes the government's constitutional amendment. It will give national law precedence over EU law, recognize only two genders (Male and female), ban surrogacy and adoption by same-sex couples. It will also include equal pay for men and women.
- September 28 – 2025 Moldovan parliamentary election was held.
- October 3 - Henri, Grand Duke of Luxembourg abdicates and his eldest son Guillaume accedes to the throne.
- October 3/4 – 2025 Czech parliamentary election was hold.
- October 17: Three people are killed and 14 others injured in an explosion caused by a suspected gas leak in an apartment block in Bucharest
- October 24 – 2025 Irish presidential election was held.
- October 29 – 2025 Dutch general election was held.
- 9–23 November – International Paderewski Piano Competition at the Pomeranian Philharmonic in Bydgoszcz, Poland
- November 23 – The 2025 Republika Srpska presidential election was held.
- December 4 - the US President Donald Trump released the National Security Strategy of his administration, The document devotes significant criticism to Europe, saying its economic problems are "eclipsed by the real and more stark prospect of civilizational erasure". It also says "Over the long term, it is more than plausible that within a few decades at the latest, certain NATO members will become majority non-European," The document calls for the US to prioritize "cultivating resistance to Europe’s current trajectory within European nations",

== Deaths ==
=== January ===
- January 2 - Ágnes Keleti, Hungarian artistic gymnast (b. 1921)

== See also ==
- 2025 in the European Union
- 2025 in politics and government
