= Žabja Vas, Novo Mesto =

Žabja Vas
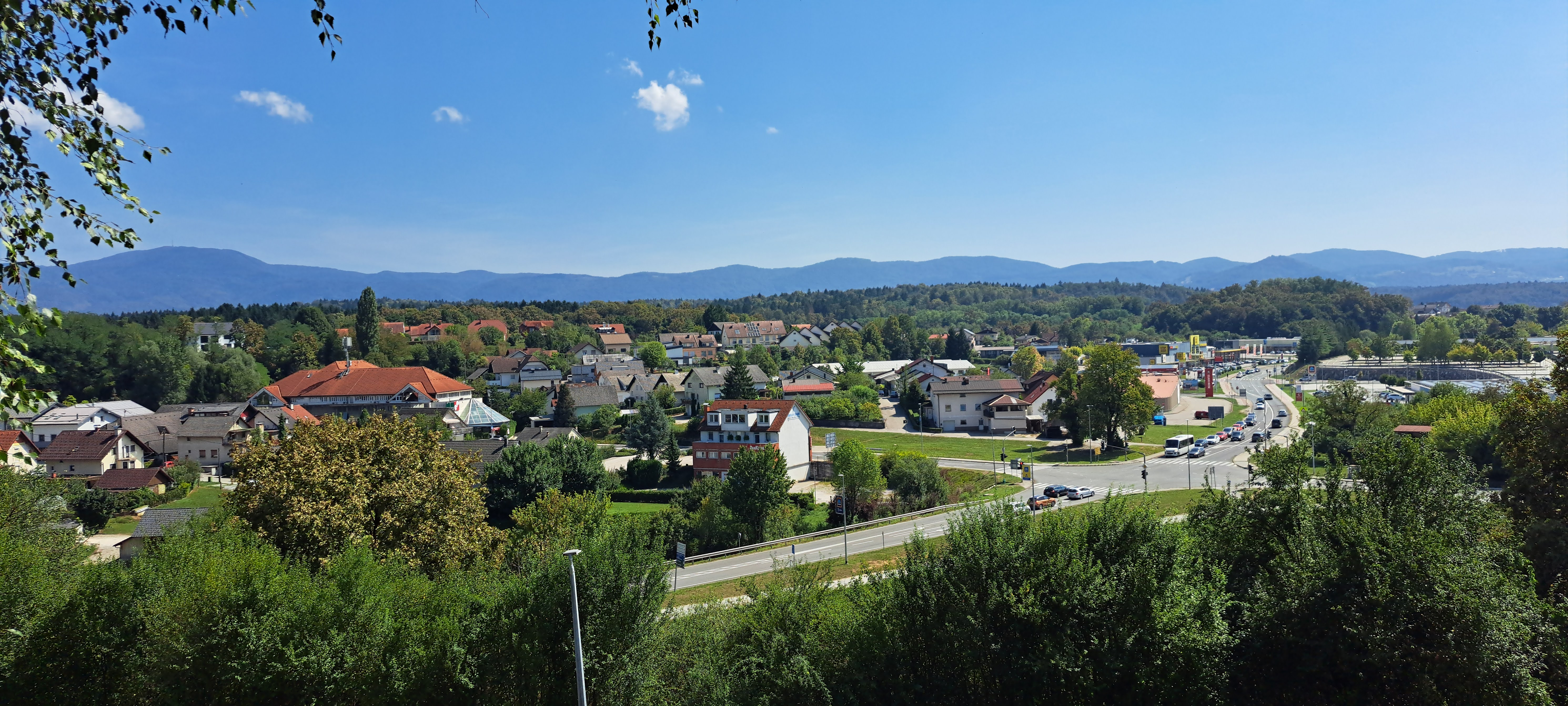

- Location in Slovenia
- Coordinates: 45°48′03″N 15°10′58″E
- Country: Slovenia
- Traditional region: Lower Carniola
- Statistical region: Southwest Slovenia
- Municipality: Novo Mesto
- Elevation: 203 m (666 ft)

Žabja Vas (pronounced [ˈʒaːbja ˈʋaːs], Slovene: Žabja vas, in older sources also Žabja Luža, German: Froschdorf) is a former village in southeastern Slovenia in the Municipality of Novo Mesto. It is now part of the city of Novo Mesto. It is part of the traditional region of Lower Carniola and is now included in the Southeast Slovenia Statistical Region.

== Geography ==
Žabja Vas lies southeast of the town center of Novo Mesto, along both sides of the road to Kostanjevica na Krki. The Gotna Vas Woods (Slovene: Gotenski boršt) stand southeast of Žabja Vas.

== Name ==
The name Žabja vas means 'frog village'. There are several places with this name in Slovenia (e.g., Žabja Vas in the Municipality of Gorenja Vas–Poljane), as well as other names based on the common noun žaba 'frog', such as Žabnica, Žabče, and Žablje. Such names originally referred to a wetland with frogs and then later to a settlement built next to it. The older name of the settlement, Žabja Luža, means 'frog pond'.

== History ==
Žabja Vas had a population of 138 in 24 houses in 1870, 120 in 27 houses in 1880, 205 in 38 houses in 1900, 245 in 45 houses in 1931, and 374 in 73 houses in 1961. Žabja Vas was annexed by the city of Novo Mesto in 1979, ending its existence as an independent settlement.

== Notable people ==
Notable people that were born or lived in Žabja Vas include the following:

- Jože Ambrožič (1884–1923), chemist and writer
- Boris Čižmek (1919–2008), Partisan and Militia head
- Milan Medvešek (1908–1966), journalist
