= Kapelski Vrh =

Kapelski Vrh may refer to:

- Kapelski Vrh, Slovenia, a village near Radenci
- Kapelski Vrh, Croatia, a village near Kraljevec na Sutli
