= International Paderewski Piano Competition =

Polish International Piano competition

- Current: XIII International Paderewski Piano Competition
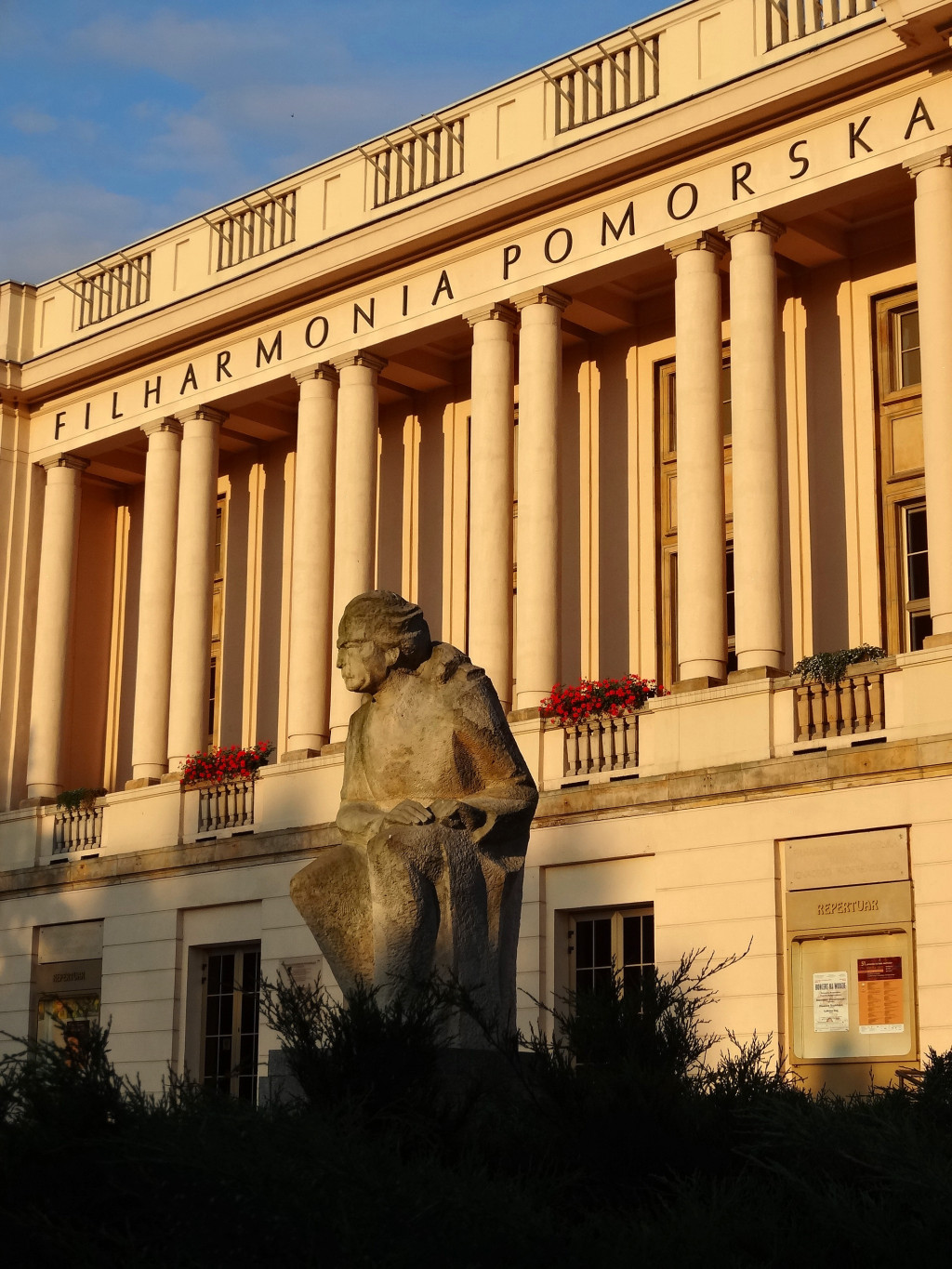
- Sculpture of Ignacy Jan Paderewski standing in front of the Pomeranian Philharmonic in Bydgoszcz, Poland
- Native name: Polish: Międzynarodowy Konkurs Pianistyczny im. Ignacego Jana Paderewskiego
- Venue: Pomeranian Philharmonic, Andrzej Szwalbe Street 6, Bydgoszcz, Kuyavian–Pomeranian Voivodeship, Poland
- Presented by: Paderewski Musical Society in Bydgoszcz
- First award: 1961; 65 years ago
- Final award: 2025
- Website: paderewskicompetition.pl

The Paderewski Piano Competition is an international (initially national) piano music competition held every three years in Bydgoszcz, open to pianists aged 16–32. The first competition took place in 1961 and is organized by the Paderewski Musical Society in Bydgoszcz, in cooperation with the Feliks Nowowiejski Academy of Music and the Pomeranian Philharmonic. The aim of the Competition is to honour the memory of Polish virtuoso pianist, composer, politician and statesman Ignacy Jan Paderewski, as well as to promote talented young pianists.

== History ==
The first competition was organized in December 1961 at the Pomeranian Philharmonic on the initiative of its director, Andrzej Szwalbe, and pianist Henryk Sztompka, who was a student of Paderewski. The competition was part of the 1960 celebrations of the Year of Ignacy Jan Paderewski and also served as a way to honor the patron of the Pomeranian Philharmonic. Twenty-three pianists from Warsaw, Kraków, Poznań, Katowice, Łódź, and Sopot entered the competition. The program primarily featured Polish music of the 19th and 20th centuries – from the works of Frédéric Chopin through Paderewski to Karol Szymanowski. The competition was won by the then-young Jerzy Maksymiuk. The next edition of the Competition was planned for 1964, but it did not take place due to the death of Henryk Sztompka.

After two decades, the competition was revived in 1986 by Jerzy Sulikowski (Professor at the Bydgoszcz Academy of Music) as well as journalists Gdańsk and Henryk Martenka. The competition coincided with the 45th anniversary of Paderewski's death. Seventeen pianists participated in the second edition, including five foreigners studying in Poland. The jury was chaired by Professor Zbigniew Śliwiński. In the same year, the Bydgoszcz Music Society adopted Ignacy Jan Paderewski as its patron. From that moment on, the Society expanded its activities to include various initiatives aimed at promoting his music and ideas. Next editions took place in 1994 and 1998, with the latter becoming international and afterwards taking place every three years.

== Competition winners ==
Competition Winners
National Ignacy Jan Paderewski Piano Competition
	Year	Date	1st Place	2nd Place	3rd Place	Sources
I	1961	1–10 December	Jerzy Maksymiuk	Maria Korecka	Piotr Lachert	
II	1986	16–26 October	Wojciech Kocyan	Andrzej Janaszek	Not awarded	
III	1994	5–13 February	Not awarded	Maciej Szyrner Piotr Lachert	Not awarded	
International Ignacy Jan Paderewski Piano Competition
IV	1998	3–14 November	JPN Tomomi Okumura	USA Michael Schneider	POL Katarzyna Borek	
V	2001	6–17 November	CZE Štěpán Kos	RUS Aleksiej Komarow	CZE Barbora Sejáková	
VI	2004	6–18 November	UKR Mariya Kim	USA Esther Jung-A Park	UKR Marina Baranowa	
VII	2007	4–18 November	RUS Nikita Mndojanc	RUS Julianna Awdiejewa	ESP Marianna Prjevalskaya	
VIII	2010	7–21 November	RUS Eduard Kunc	KOR Kim Hyun-jung	RUS Siergiej Riedkin; POL Michał Szymanowski	
IX	2013	3–17 November	KOR Moon Zheeyoung	UKR Dinara Klinton	JPN Daiki Kato	
X	2016	6–20 November	KOR Lee Hyuk	POL Jakub Kuszlik	RUS Swietłana Andriejewa	
XI	2019	10–24 November	RUS Filip Łynow	POL Kamil Pacholec	JPN Yasuko Furumi	
XII	2022	6–20 November	POL Mateusz Krzyżowski	ESP Pedro López Salas	UKR Danyło Sajenko	
XIII	2025	9–23 November	KOR Hyunjin Roh	ITA Elia Cecino	TWN Pin-Hong Lin	

== See also ==
- List of classical music competitions
