= Rački Vrh =

- Location in Slovenia
- Coordinates: 46°36′50.56″N 16°3′14.49″E
- Country: Slovenia
- Traditional region: Styria
- Statistical region: Mura
- Municipality: Radenci

Area
  - Total: 0.66 km^{2} (0.25 sq mi)
- Elevation: 246.3 m (808 ft)

Population (2002)
  - Total: 77

Rački Vrh (pronounced [ˈɾaːtʃki ˈʋəɾx]) is a settlement in the hills west of Hrastje in the Municipality of Radenci in northeastern Slovenia.
