= Turjanski Vrh =

- Location in Slovenia
- Coordinates: 46°37′0.79″N 16°2′54.01″E
- Country: Slovenia
- Traditional region: Styria
- Statistical region: Mura
- Municipality: Radenci

Area
  - Total: 0.55 km^{2} (0.21 sq mi)
- Elevation: 268.6 m (881 ft)

Population (2002)
  - Total: 80

Turjanski Vrh (pronounced [ˈtuːɾjanski ˈʋəɾx]) is a settlement in the hills above Mota in the Municipality of Radenci in northeastern Slovenia.
