= Radenci Basin =

Floodplain in Slovenia

Coordinates: 46°38′15″N 16°3′7″E

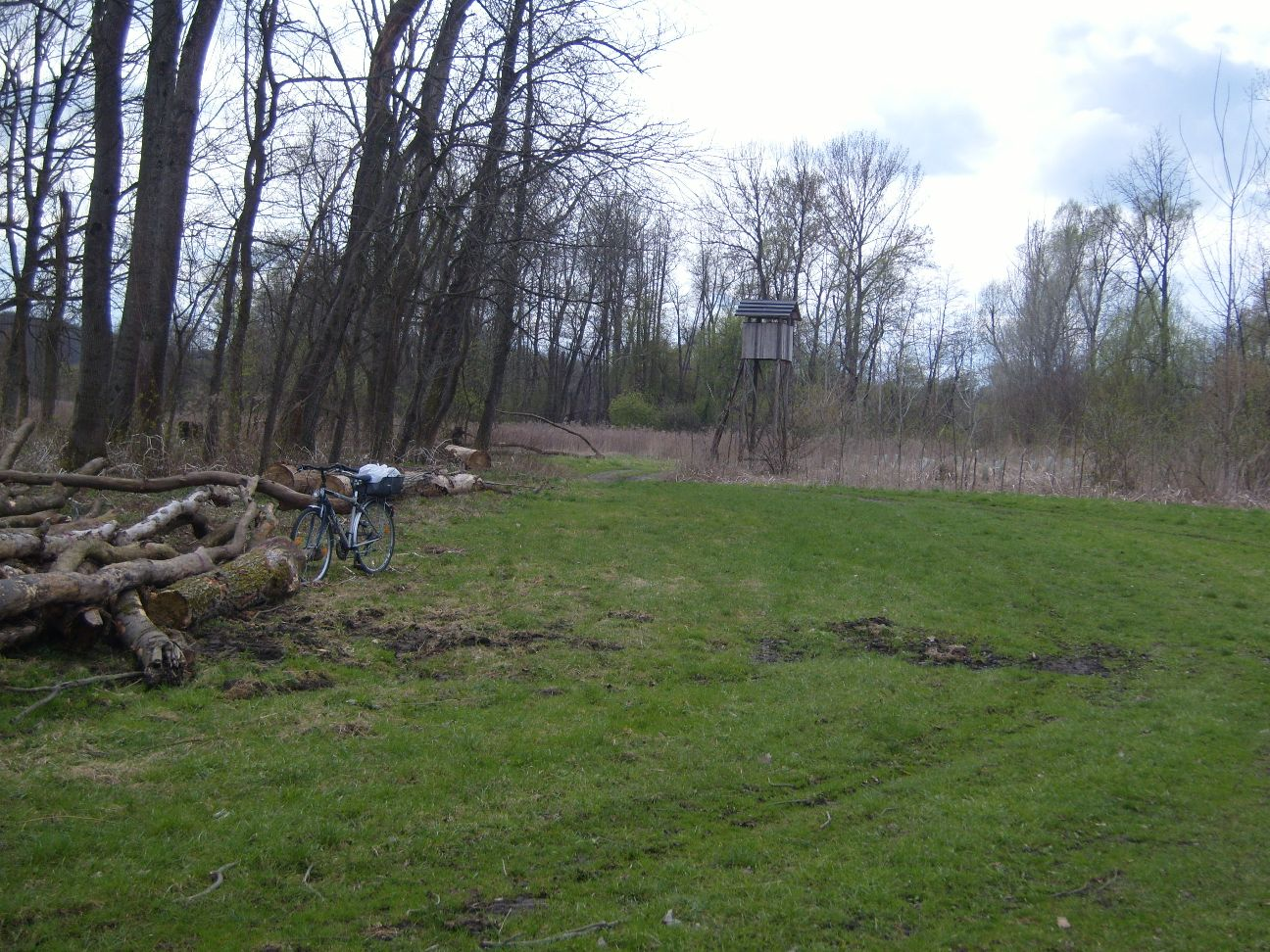
Wooded area in the Radenci Basin

The Radenci Basin (pronounced [ˈɾaːdɛntsi]; Slovene: Radensko polje) is a floodplain of the Mura River in Slovenia.

== Geography ==
The Radenci Basin lies on the right side of the Mura River, between Gornja Radgona and Hrastje–Mota, primarily in the Municipality of Radenci. It is approximately 2 kilometers (1.2 mi) wide and 6 kilometers (3.7 mi) long. It is separated from the nearby Apače Basin (Slovene: Apaško polje) by the Radgona Hills (Slovene: Radgonske gorice), which are an extension of the Slovene Hills.
