= Okoslavci =

- Location in Slovenia
- Coordinates: 46°35′54.4″N 16°1′6.06″E
- Country: Slovenia
- Traditional region: Styria
- Statistical region: Mura
- Municipality: Radenci

Area
  - Total: 2.75 km^{2} (1.06 sq mi)
- Elevation: 206.9 m (679 ft)

Population (2002)
  - Total: 241

Okoslavci (pronounced [ɔˈkoːslau̯tsi]) is a settlement in the Municipality of Radenci in northeastern Slovenia.

There is a chapel-shrine in the settlement by the side of the road leading to Kapelski Vrh. It was built in 1925 and has a small belfry.
