= Radensko polje =

Radensko polje may refer to multiple places in Slovenia:

- Račna Karst Field (Slovene: Radensko polje), a karst field near Grosuplje
- Radenci Basin (Slovene: Radensko polje), a floodplain near Radenci
