= Hrašenski Vrh =

- Location in Slovenia
- Coordinates: 46°36′33.27″N 16°3′28.25″E
- Country: Slovenia
- Traditional region: Styria
- Statistical region: Mura
- Municipality: Radenci

Area
  - Total: 0.61 km^{2} (0.24 sq mi)
- Elevation: 250.2 m (821 ft)

Population (2002)
  - Total: 78

Hrašenski Vrh (pronounced [ˈxɾaːʃɛnski ˈʋəɾx]) is a small dispersed settlement above Hrastje in the Municipality of Radenci in northeastern Slovenia.
