= Murski Vrh =

- Location in Slovenia
- Coordinates: 46°36′13.82″N 16°3′57.81″E
- Country: Slovenia
- Traditional region: Styria
- Statistical region: Mura
- Municipality: Radenci

Area
  - Total: 0.92 km^{2} (0.36 sq mi)
- Elevation: 228.6 m (750 ft)

Population (2002)
  - Total: 134

Murski Vrh (pronounced [ˈmuːɾski ˈʋəɾx]) is a settlement in the hills south of Hrastje in the Municipality of Radenci in northeastern Slovenia.
