= Paričjak =

- Location in Slovenia
- Coordinates: 46°37′31.15″N 16°2′27.33″E
- Country: Slovenia
- Traditional region: Styria
- Statistical region: Mura
- Municipality: Radenci

Area
  - Total: 0.77 km^{2} (0.30 sq mi)
- Elevation: 249.9 m (820 ft)

Population (2002)
  - Total: 251

Paričjak (pronounced [paˈɾiːtʃjak]) is a settlement in the Municipality of Radenci in northeastern Slovenia. It lies along the road from Radenci to Kapelski Vrh.

There is a chapel-shrine with a belfry in the settlement. It was built in the early 20th century.
