= Kocian =

Kocian or Kocián (Czech/Slovak feminine: Kocianová, Kociánová) is a surname. Notable people with the surname include:

- Adam Kocian (born 1995), German volleyball player
- František Kocián, Czech wrestler
- Jana Kocianová (1946–2018), Slovak singer
- Ján Kocian (born 1958), Slovak footballer and manager
- Jaroslav Kocián (1883–1950), Czech violinist and composer
- Madison Kocian (born 1997), American artistic gymnast

== See also ==
- Kocian Quartet
- Kocjan (disambiguation)
- Kocijan
- Kocyan
- Kóczián
- Kotzian
