= Kóczián =

Kóczián is a surname. Notable people with the surname include:

- Éva Kóczián (born 1936), Hungarian table tennis player
- Jenő Kóczián (born 1967), Hungarian shot put athlete
- Johanna von Koczian (1933–2024), German actress and singer
- József Kóczián (1926–2009), Hungarian table tennis player

== See also ==
- Kocian
- Kocjan (disambiguation)
- Kocyan
