= Šratovci =

- Location in Slovenia
- Coordinates: 46°38′57.74″N 16°1′40.08″E
- Country: Slovenia
- Traditional region: Styria
- Statistical region: Mura
- Municipality: Radenci

Area
  - Total: 1.67 km^{2} (0.64 sq mi)
- Elevation: 210 m (690 ft)

Population (2002)
  - Total: 182

Šratovci (pronounced [ˈʃɾaːtɔu̯tsi]) is a village on the right bank of the Mura River in the Municipality of Radenci in northeastern Slovenia, close to the border with Austria.
