= Zgornji Kocjan =

- Location in Slovenia
- Coordinates: 46°36′55.75″N 16°2′38.4″E
- Country: Slovenia
- Traditional region: Styria
- Statistical region: Mura
- Municipality: Radenci

Area
  - Total: 0.3 km^{2} (0.12 sq mi)
- Elevation: 280.2 m (919 ft)

Population (2002)
  - Total: 37

Zgornji Kocjan (pronounced [ˈzɡoːɾnji ˈkoːtsjan]) is a small settlement in the hills above Mota in the Municipality of Radenci in northeastern Slovenia.
