= Melanjski Vrh =

- Location in Slovenia
- Coordinates: 46°37′19.77″N 16°0′44.63″E
- Country: Slovenia
- Traditional region: Styria
- Statistical region: Mura
- Municipality: Radenci

Area
  - Total: 0.23 km^{2} (0.089 sq mi)
- Elevation: 267.2 m (877 ft)

Population (2002)
  - Total: 28

Melanjski Vrh (pronounced [mɛˈlaːnski ˈʋəɾx]) is a small settlement in the Municipality of Radenci in northeastern Slovenia.
