= Murščak =

- Location in Slovenia
- Coordinates: 46°35′38.7″N 16°3′44.57″E
- Country: Slovenia
- Traditional region: Styria
- Statistical region: Mura
- Municipality: Radenci

Area
  - Total: 1.26 km^{2} (0.49 sq mi)
- Elevation: 285.2 m (936 ft)

Population (2002)
  - Total: 161

Murščak (pronounced [ˈmuːɾʃtʃak]) is a settlement in the Municipality of Radenci in northeastern Slovenia.
