= Kocyan =

Kocyan is a surname. Notable people with the surname include:

- Antoni Kocyan (1836–1916), Polish ornithologist
- Józef Kocyan (born 1946), Polish ski jumper
- Wojciech Kocyan, Polish pianist

== See also ==
- Kocian
- Kocjan (disambiguation)
- Kóczián
