= Radenski Vrh =

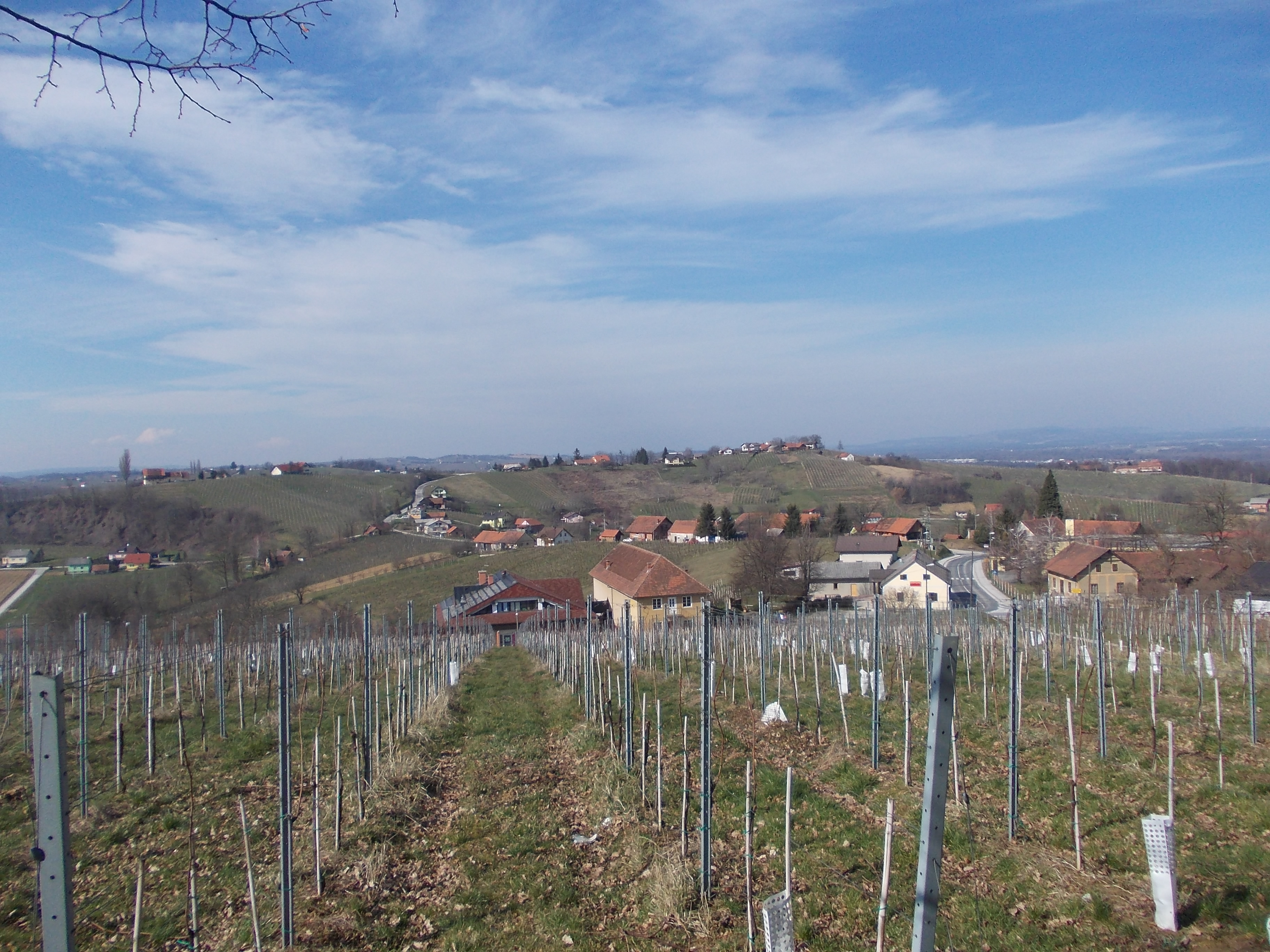
- View of Radenski Vrh from Kapelski Vrh

- Location in Slovenia
- Coordinates: 46°37′27.77″N 16°1′31.79″E
- Country: Slovenia
- Traditional region: Styria
- Statistical region: Mura
- Municipality: Radenci

Area
  - Total: 1.18 km^{2} (0.46 sq mi)
- Elevation: 300 m (980 ft)

Population (2002)
  - Total: 162

Radenski Vrh (pronounced [ˈɾaːdɛnski ˈʋəɾx]) is a settlement in the Municipality of Radenci in northeastern Slovenia.
