= Turjanci =

- Location in Slovenia
- Coordinates: 46°37′40.48″N 16°3′44.61″E
- Country: Slovenia
- Traditional region: Styria
- Statistical region: Mura
- Municipality: Radenci

Area
  - Total: 1.03 km^{2} (0.40 sq mi)
- Elevation: 201.1 m (660 ft)

Population (2002)
  - Total: 111

Turjanci (pronounced [ˈtuːɾjantsi]) is a settlement on the right bank of the Mura River in the Municipality of Radenci in northeastern Slovenia. It lies on the main road from Radenci to Ljutomer.
