= Janžev Vrh =

- Location in Slovenia
- Coordinates: 46°37′56.09″N 16°0′2.52″E
- Country: Slovenia
- Traditional region: Styria
- Statistical region: Mura
- Municipality: Radenci

Area
  - Total: 2.71 km^{2} (1.05 sq mi)
- Elevation: 289.9 m (951 ft)

Population (2002)
  - Total: 255

Janžev Vrh (pronounced [ˈjaːnʒɛu̯ ˈʋəɾx]) is a dispersed settlement above Boračeva in the Municipality of Radenci in northeastern Slovenia.
