= Kobilščak =

- Location in Slovenia
- Coordinates: 46°37′41.71″N 16°1′30.17″E
- Country: Slovenia
- Traditional region: Styria
- Statistical region: Mura
- Municipality: Radenci

Area
  - Total: 0.4 km^{2} (0.15 sq mi)
- Elevation: 292 m (958 ft)

Population (2002)
  - Total: 52

Kobilščak (pronounced [kɔˈbiːlʃtʃak]) is a small settlement in the hills south of Radenci in northeastern Slovenia.
