= Rihtarovci =

- Location in Slovenia
- Coordinates: 46°37′48.55″N 16°3′12.32″E
- Country: Slovenia
- Traditional region: Styria
- Statistical region: Mura
- Municipality: Radenci

Area
  - Total: 1.93 km^{2} (0.75 sq mi)
- Elevation: 208.4 m (684 ft)

Population (2002)
  - Total: 70

Rihtarovci (pronounced [ˈɾiːxtaɾɔu̯tsi]; German: Richterofzen) is a small settlement on the right bank of the Mura River in the Municipality of Radenci in northeastern Slovenia.
