= Žrnova =

- Location in Slovenia
- Coordinates: 46°37′17.69″N 16°0′59.63″E
- Country: Slovenia
- Traditional region: Styria
- Statistical region: Mura
- Municipality: Radenci

Area
  - Total: 0.63 km^{2} (0.24 sq mi)
- Elevation: 230 m (750 ft)

Population (2002)
  - Total: 24

Žrnova (pronounced [ˈʒəɾnɔʋa]) is a small dispersed settlement in the Municipality of Radenci in northeastern Slovenia.
