= Spodnji Kocjan =

- Location in Slovenia
- Coordinates: 46°36′29.54″N 16°2′0.29″E
- Country: Slovenia
- Traditional region: Styria
- Statistical region: Mura
- Municipality: Radenci

Area
  - Total: 0.72 km^{2} (0.28 sq mi)
- Elevation: 260.3 m (854 ft)

Population (2002)
  - Total: 70

Spodnji Kocjan (pronounced [ˈspoːdnji ˈkoːtsjan]) is a small settlement in the Municipality of Radenci in northeastern Slovenia.
