= Opinion polling for the next German federal election =

In the run-up to the next German federal election following the 23 February 2025 election, which needs to take place before 26 March 2029, various organisations have carried out opinion polling to gauge voting intentions. Results of such polls are displayed below.

== Electoral threshold of 5% ==
Seats in the Bundestag are allocated to parties that either receive at least 5 percent of proportional votes (called "second votes" in Germany as the option appears second on the ballot, after the constituency or "first vote"), or win at least three constituencies. In the 2021 German federal election, Die Linke (The Left) won 3 constituencies and thus received proportional representation despite receiving just 4.9% of second votes. In 2022, this three constituency provision was abolished but was later reinstated by the Federal Constitutional Court. In addition to Die Linke, this also benefits the Christian Social Union in Bavaria (CSU), which competes only in Bavaria, and therefore has often been close to missing the 5% nationwide despite regularly winning all constituencies in the state. As the CDU does not run in Bavaria, only a few polls show the CDU and CSU as separate parties, with most combining CDU/CSU as the Union. The two parties always coalition together in the federal level and agree on the vast majority of issues.

In the 2025 German federal election, both the Free Democratic Party (FDP) and Sahra Wagenknecht Alliance (BSW) narrowly failed to meet the 5% electoral threshold to gain parliamentary representation. Both of these parties are present in a few state parliaments and even in state governments, and are still regularly polled despite not being present in the 21st Bundestag. Some polls include the Free Voters (FW), a general name used by unaffiliated groups in local elections, which was adopted by a party that is present in three state parliaments (Bavaria, Rhineland-Palatinate, and Saxony) and one state government coalition (Bavaria). Other parties are categorised as "others".

== Reliability of pollsters ==
The poll aggregator Europe Elects provides a list of past pollster accuracy and conflict of interest on its website. The organization includes Allensbach, Forsa, Forschungsgruppe Wahlen, GMS, Infratest dimap, INSA, Ipsos, Verian, YouGov, pollytix, Trend research, and pmg - policy matters in its databases and highlights their reliability and transparency. All of them are part of professional pollster associations. Civey is excluded and their lack of methodological rigour referenced. Below-listed Wahlkreisprognose and America-based Democracy Institute are excluded from Europe Elects's coverage. The poll aggregator points out that they have no membership in a professional association.

== Poll results ==
=== Graphical summary ===
Opinion polling for the 2029 German federal election using Local regression (LOESS) of polls conducted.

=== 2026 ===
Polling firm	Fieldwork date	Sample size	Abs. (Note: In Forsa polls, abstaining and undecided voters are combined.)	Union	AfD	SPD	Grüne	Linke	BSW	FDP	Others	Lead
INSA	16–20 Nov 2026	1.201	–	19	28	14	14	10	3	5	7	9
Verian	11–17 Nov 2026	1,472	–	20	28	14	15	10	3	4	6	8
YouGov	13–16 Nov 2026	1,790	–	19	29	15	15	10	2	5	5	10
INSA	13–16 Nov 2026	2.006	–	19	28	14	15	9.5	3.5	4.5	6.5	9
Forsa	10–16 Nov 2026	2,501	25	21	26	13	16	11	–	4	9	5
INSA	9–13 Nov 2026	1.204	–	19	28	14	15	10	3	5	6	9
Forschungsgruppe Wahlen	10–12 Nov 2026	1,297	18	22	28	13	15	10	–	3	9	6
INSA	6–9 Nov 2026	2.004	–	19.5	28.5	14	14.5	9.5	3.5	5	5.5	9
Forsa	3–9 Nov 2026	2,501	27	20	27	13	16	11	–	4	9	7
Ipsos	4–8 Nov 2026	2,019	–	20	27	14	16	10	3	5	5	7
INSA	2–6 Nov 2026	1,204	–	19	29	14	15	10	3	5	5	10
Infratest dimap	2–4 Nov 2026	1,297	–	20	27	13	16	11	3	3	7	7
INSA	30 Oct – 2 Nov 2026	2,004	–	20	28	14	15	10	3.5	5	4.5	8
Forsa	27 Oct – 2 Nov 2026	2,500	25	20	26	14	17	11	–	4	8	6
INSA	26–30 Oct 2026	1,202	–	20	29	14	15	10	3	5	4	9
INSA	23–26 Oct 2026	2,010	–	19	29.5	14	14	10	3	5	5.5	10.5
Forsa	20–26 Oct 2026	2,501	25	21	27	13	16	11	–	4	8	6
INSA	19–23 Oct 2026	1,209	–	19	30	14	14	10	3	4	6	11
Forschungsgruppe Wahlen	20–22 Oct 2026	1,225	16	23	26	14	13	11	–	3	10	3
Verian	14–20 Oct 2026	1,470	–	20	28	13	16	11	3	3	6	8
pollytix	16–19 Oct 2026	1,300	–	19	29	15	14	11	4	5	4	10
YouGov	16–19 Oct 2026	1,773	–	18	28	14	16	10	3	5	6	10
INSA	16–19 Oct 2026	2,002	–	18	30	14	14	11	3.5	5	4.5	12
GMS	14–19 Oct 2026	1,012	–	19	30	12	15	10	3	3	8 (Note: Free Voters: 1 %)	11
Forsa	13–19 Oct 2026	2,502	25	20	27	13	17	11	–	4	8	7
INSA	12–16 Oct 2026	1,206	–	18	29	13	14	11	4	4	7	11
Allensbach	2–16 Oct 2026	1,048	–	23	27	14	14	11	–	4	7	4
INSA	9–12 Oct 2026	2,006	–	18.5	30	13.5	14	10	3.5	4.5	6	11.5
Forsa	6–12 Oct 2026	2,502	25	19	26	14	17	12	–	4	8	7
INSA	5–9 Oct 2026	1,207	–	19	30	13	14	10	3	4	7	11
Forschungsgruppe Wahlen	5–7 Oct 2026	1,311	16	21	28	13	15	12	–	3	8	7
INSA	2–5 Oct 2026	2,002	–	17.5	30.5	14.5	14.5	10.5	3.5	4.5	4.5	13
Forsa	29 Sep – 5 Oct 2026	2,502	24	19	26	14	17	11	–	4	9	7
Ipsos	30 Sep – 4 Oct 2026	2,002	–	20	28	13	15	12	3	4	5	8
INSA	28 Sep – 2 Oct 2026	1,202	–	18	30	14	14	10	4	4	6	12
Infratest dimap	28–30 Sep 2026	1,303	–	20	27	13	16	11	–	4	9	7
INSA	25–28 Sep 2026	2,001	–	19	29.5	14.5	14.5	10	3.5	4	5	10.5
Forsa	22–28 Sep 2026	2,501	24	19	26	14	16	12	3	4	6	7
INSA	21–25 Sep 2026	1,203	–	19	29	14	15	10	3	4	6	10
Forschungsgruppe Wahlen	22–24 Sep 2026	1,346	14	21	28	13	14	12	–	3	9	7
Verian	16–22 Sep 2026	1,464	–	20	28	14	15	12	3	4	4	8
INSA	18–21 Sep 2026	2,004	–	19.5	29.5	13.5	13.5	10.5	3.5	4.5	5.5	10
Forsa	15–22 Sep 2026	2,504	25	20	27	12	17	12	3	4	5	7
INSA	14–18 Sep 2026	1,202	–	20	29	13	14	11	3	5	5	9
pollytix	14–16 Sep 2026	3,113	–	19	27	14	14	12	5	5	4	8
Allensbach	4–16 Sep 2026	1,051	–	23	28	13	14	10	–	5	7	5
YouGov	11–14 Sep 2026	1,787	–	18	29	13	16	10	4	5	5	11
INSA	10–14 Sep 2026	2,006	–	19.5	29	12.5	14	10.5	3.5	4.5	6.5	9.5
GMS	9–14 Sep 2026	1,009	–	20	30	11	14	11	3	4	7 (Note: Free Voters: 1 %)	10
Forsa	8–14 Sep 2026	2,502	26	20	27	12	18	12	3	4	4	7
INSA	7–10 Sep 2026	1,203	–	20	29	13	14	10	3	4	7	9
INSA	4–7 Sep 2026	2,010	–	19.5	29	12.5	13.5	10.5	4	4.5	6.5	9.5
Forsa	1–7 Sep 2026	2,502	29	21	28	12	16	11	3	4	5	7
INSA	31 Aug – 4 Sep 2026	1,206	–	20	28	13	13	10	4	4	8	8.0
pollytix	27 Aug – 3 Sep 2026	3,023	–	20	29	14	13	11	4	5	4	9
Infratest dimap	31 Aug – 2 Sep 2026	1,319	–	21	27	13	15	12	–	4	8	6
INSA	28–31 Aug 2026	2,002	–	20.5	29	12	13.5	10.5	3.5	4.5	6.5	8.5
Ipsos	26–31 Aug 2026	2,105	–	21	27	12	15	13	3	5	4	6
Forsa	25–31 Aug 2026	2,504	29	21	28	12	16	12	–	4	7	7
INSA	24–28 Aug 2026	1,200	–	20	29	12	13	10	4	4	8	9
Verian	19–25 Aug 2026	1,451	–	20	28	13	16	12	2	4	5	8
INSA	21–24 Aug 2026	2,004	–	20.5	29	12	13.5	11	3	4.5	6.5	8.5
Forsa	18–24 Aug 2026	2,501	28	21	28	12	16	12	–	4	7	7
INSA	17–21 Aug 2026	1,203	–	21	29	12	13	11	3	5	6	8
Forschungsgruppe Wahlen	17–19 Aug 2026	1,319	19	22	27	12	14	12	–	4	9	5
YouGov	14–17 Aug 2026	1,744	–	20	28	12	15	12	3	5	5	8
INSA	14–17 Aug 2026	2,006	–	20.5	28.5	12	13	12	3	5	6	8
pollytix	12–17 Aug 2026	1,276	–	20	28	15	13	11	4	5	4	8
Forsa	11–17 Aug 2026	2,504	29	21	28	12	16	12	–	4	7	7
INSA	10–14 Aug 2026	1,203	–	20	28	12	13	12	3	5	7	8
Allensbach	1–13 Aug 2026	1,039	–	22.5	27.5	13	13	11	–	6	7	5
INSA	7–10 Aug 2026	2,010	–	20.5	28.5	12.5	13	11.5	3	4.5	6.5	8
Forsa	4–10 Aug 2026	2,503	30	21	28	12	16	12	–	4	7	7
INSA	3–7 Aug 2026	1,205	–	21	28	12	13	11	3	5	7	7
Infratest dimap	3–5 Aug 2026	1,297	–	21	28	12	15	11	–	4	9	7
INSA	31 Jul – 3 Aug 2026	2,004	–	21	28	12	13.5	11	4	5	5.5	7
Forsa	27 Jul – 3 Aug 2026	2,501	27	21	28	12	16	12	–	4	7	7
Ipsos	31 Jul – 2 Aug 2026	1,000	–	21	28	12	15	13	3	5	3	7
INSA	27–31 Jul 2026	1,201	–	21	28	12	14	11	4	5	5	7
Forschungsgruppe Wahlen	28–30 Jul 2026	1,405	15	23	28	12	13	12	–	4	8	5
Verian	22–28 Jul 2026	1,456	–	21	27	13	15	12	3	4	5	6
INSA	24–27 Jul 2026	2,006	–	21	28	12.5	13.5	11	4	4	6	7
Forsa	21–27 Jul 2026	2,502	27	21	27	12	16	13	–	4	7	6
INSA	20–24 Jul 2026	1,204	–	21	28	12	14	11	4	4	6	7
INSA	17–20 Jul 2026	2,005	–	20.5	29	13	13	10.5	3.5	4.5	6	8.5
GMS	15–20 Jul 2026	1,005	–	23	28	11	13	10	2	5	8 (Note: Free Voters: 1 %)	5
INSA	13–17 Jul 2026	1,201	–	21	29	13	13	10	3	4	7	8
Forsa	14–20 Jul 2026	2,502	27	22	26	12	16	12	–	4	8	4
Forschungsgruppe Wahlen	14–16 Jul 2026	1,284	17	23	27	12	14	13	–	4	7	4
Allensbach	3–16 Jul 2026	1,040	–	24	26.5	13	13	10	–	5.5	8	2.5
YouGov	10–13 Jul 2026	1,827	–	20	27	12	14	12	4	5	6	7
INSA	10–13 Jul 2026	2,006	–	21.5	28.5	12.5	13	10.5	4	4	6	7
Forsa	7–13 Jul 2026	2,503	26	22	26	12	16	12	–	4	8	4
INSA	6–10 Jul 2026	1,204	–	22	28	12	12	11	4	4	7	6
Ipsos	4–6 Jul 2026	1,000	–	22	28	13	14	13	3	4	3	6
INSA	3–6 Jul 2026	2,010	–	22	29	12.5	13	10.5	4	4	5	7
Forsa	30 Jun – 6 Jul 2026	2,502	27	22	26	12	15	12	3	4	6	4
INSA	29 Jun – 3 Jul 2026	1,205	–	21	29	13	13	10	4	4	6	8
Infratest dimap	29 Jun – 1 Jul 2026	1,317	–	22	27	12	15	11	–	4	9	5
Verian	24–30 Jun 2026	1,470	–	22	27	13	15	11	3	4	5	5
INSA	26–29 Jun 2026	2,006	–	22	29	12	13	10.5	3.5	4	6	7
Forsa	23–29 Jun 2026	2,505	26	22	26	12	15	12	3	4	6	4
INSA	22–26 Jun 2026	1,204	–	22	29	12	13	10	3	4	7	7
INSA	19–22 Jun 2026	2,008	–	21.5	29	12.5	13	10.5	3.5	4	6	7.5
Forsa	16–22 Jun 2026	2,504	25	22	27	12	15	11	3	4	6	5
INSA	15–19 Jun 2026	1,204	–	22	29	13	13	10	3	3	7	7
Forschungsgruppe Wahlen	16–18 Jun 2026	1,190	15	24	28	13	12	11	–	4	8	4
pollytix	11–17 Jun 2026	2,040	–	21	28	14	13	11	4	5	4	7
Allensbach	5–17 Jun 2026	1,047	–	24	28	12.5	13	10	–	5.5	7	4
YouGov	12–15 Jun 2026	1,793	–	20	29	12	14	12	4	5	5	9
INSA	12–15 Jun 2026	2,003	–	22	29	12	14.5	10.5	3.5	3.5	5	7
Forsa	9–15 Jun 2026	2,500	26	21	27	12	15	11	3	5	6	6
INSA	8–12 Jun 2026	1,203	–	22	29	13	14	10	3	3	6	7
INSA	5–8 Jun 2026	2,009	–	21	29	12	14.5	10.5	3.5	3.5	6	8
Forsa	2–8 Jun 2026	2,502	26	22	27	11	15	11	3	5	6	5
INSA	1–5 Jun 2026	1,206	–	21	29	12	14	11	3	3	7	8
Allensbach	22 May – 5 Jun 2026	1,010	–	24	27	13.5	13	9.5	–	5	8	3
Forschungsgruppe Wahlen	1–3 Jun 2026	1,247	14	25	27	12	14	11	–	3	8	2
Infratest dimap	1–2 Jun 2026	1,326	–	23	27	13	14	10	3	4	6	4
Verian	27 May – 2 Jun 2026	1,454	–	23	27	13	15	10	2	4	6	4
INSA	29 May – 1 Jun 2026	2,006	–	22	29	12	13.5	10.5	3.5	3.5	6	7
GMS	27 May – 1 Jun 2026	1,023	–	23	27	11	16	11	2	5	5 (Note: Free Voters: 2 %)	4
Forsa	26 May – 1 Jun 2026	2,502	–	21	27	12	15	11	3	5	6	6
INSA	26–29 May 2026	1,205	–	22	29	12	14	11	3	3	6	7
INSA	22–26 May 2026	2,010	–	22	29	12	14	10.5	3	4	5.5	7
Forsa	19–22 May 2026	2,002	25	22	27	12	15	11	3	4	6	5
INSA	18–22 May 2026	1,203	–	22	29	12	14	11	3	4	5	7
Forschungsgruppe Wahlen	19–21 May 2026	1,340	15	24	26	12	15	12	–	3	8	2
INSA	15–18 May 2026	2,005	–	22	29	12.5	14	10.5	3.5	3.5	5	7
Forsa	12–18 May 2026	2,000	26	22	28	12	14	11	3	4	6	6
INSA	11–15 May 2026	1,203	–	22	29	12	14	10	3	3	7	7
YouGov	8–11 May 2026	1,783	–	22	28	13	13	11	4	4	5	6
INSA	8–11 May 2026	2,006	–	23	28	13	12.5	11	3.5	3.5	5.5	5
Forsa	5–11 May 2026	2,501	25	22	27	12	15	11	–	4	9	5
Ipsos	8–10 May 2026	1,000	–	23	26	13	14	12	3	4	5	3
INSA	4–8 May 2026	1,200	–	23	28	13	13	11	3	3	6	5
Forschungsgruppe Wahlen	5–7 May 2026	1,240	15	25	27	12	13	11	–	3	9	2
Infratest dimap	4–6 May 2026	1,303	–	24	27	12	15	10	3	4	5	3
Verian	28 Apr – 5 May 2026	1,448	–	24	25	13	15	10	3	4	6	1
INSA	30 Apr – 4 May 2026	2,008	–	24	27.5	13.5	13	10.5	3.5	4	4	3.5
Forsa	28 Apr – 4 May 2026	2,002	–	22	27	12	16	11	–	4	8	5
INSA	27–30 Apr 2026	1,207	–	24	28	14	13	11	3	3	4	4
Allensbach	18–30 Apr 2026	1,015	–	25	26	12.5	14	10	–	4.5	8	1
INSA	24–27 Apr 2026	2,010	–	23.5	28	14	12.5	11	3.5	3.5	4	4.5
Forsa	21–27 Apr 2026	2,503	26	22	27	12	15	12	–	4	8	5
INSA	20–24 Apr 2026	1,203	–	24	28	14	12	11	3	3	5	4
INSA	17–20 Apr 2026	2,003	–	24	26.5	14	12.5	11	3.5	3.5	5	2.5
Forsa	14–20 Apr 2026	2,502	26	24	26	12	15	11	–	4	8	2
INSA	13–17 Apr 2026	1,201	–	24	27	14	13	11	3	3	5	3
Forschungsgruppe Wahlen	14–16 Apr 2026	1,355	15	25	26	12	14	11	–	3	9	1
YouGov	10–13 Apr 2026	1,763	–	23	27	13	14	10	4	4	5	4
INSA	10–13 Apr 2026	2,006	–	25	26	14	12.5	10	3.5	3.5	5.5	1
Forsa	7–13 Apr 2026	1,502	–	24	26	12	15	11	–	4	8	2
INSA	7–10 Apr 2026	1,205	–	25	26	14	13	10	4	3	5	1
Allensbach	23 Mar – 9 Apr 2026	1,057	–	26	25	14	13	10	–	4	8	1
INSA	2–7 Apr 2026	2,002	–	25	26	13	12	10.5	4	3.5	6	1
Verian	30 Mar – 7 Apr 2026	1,460	–	25	25	14	14	11	3	3	5	Tie
Forsa	31 Mar – 2 Apr 2026	1,503	26	26	26	12	15	10	–	–	11	Tie
INSA	30 Mar – 2 Apr 2026	1,199	–	25	26	13	12	11	4	3	6	1
Infratest dimap	30–31 Mar 2026	1,316	–	26	25	12	14	10	3	3	7	1
INSA	27–30 Mar 2026	2,006	–	26	26	14.5	12	10.5	3.5	3	4.5	Tie
Forsa	24–30 Mar 2026	2,504	24	26	25	12	15	10	3	–	9	1
Ipsos	27–29 Mar 2026	1,000	–	24	25	14	14	11	3	5	4	1
INSA	23–27 Mar 2026	1,205	–	26	26	14	12	11	3	3	5	Tie
Forschungsgruppe Wahlen	24–26 Mar 2026	1,206	13	26	26	13	15	10	–	–	10	Tie
INSA	20–23 Mar 2026	2,010	–	26	26	15	12	10	3.5	3	4.5	Tie
Forsa	17–23 Mar 2026	2,501	25	26	25	12	15	10	3	–	9	1
INSA	16–20 Mar 2026	1,205	–	26	25	15	12	11	3	3	5	1
YouGov	13–16 Mar 2026	1,851	–	26	26	14	13	9	3	3	6	Tie
INSA	13–16 Mar 2026	2,002	–	25.5	26	15	12	10.5	3.5	3	4.5	0.5
Forsa	10–16 Mar 2026	2,503	23	27	23	12	15	11	3	–	9	4
INSA	9–13 Mar 2026	1,201	–	25	25	15	12	11	3	3	6	Tie
Allensbach	27 Feb – 12 Mar 2026	1,045	–	28	23	16	11.5	10	–	4	7.5	5
Verian	4–10 Mar 2026	1,471	–	26	23	15	13	11	3	3	6	3
INSA	6–9 Mar 2026	2,003	–	26	24.5	15.5	11.5	10.5	3.5	3.5	5	1.5
Forsa	3–9 Mar 2026	2,502	25	26	24	14	12	11	3	3	7	2
INSA	2–6 Mar 2026	1,200	–	26	25	15	11	11	3	4	5	1
Infratest dimap	2–4 Mar 2026	1,317	–	28	23	14	13	9	4	–	9	5
INSA	27 Feb – 2 Mar 2026	2,002	–	25.5	25	16	11.5	10	3.5	3	5.5	0.5
GMS	25 Feb – 2 Mar 2026	1,027	–	26	24	16	12	10	3	3	6 (Note: Free Voters: 2 %)	2
Forsa	24 Feb – 2 Mar 2026	2,503	26	26	24	14	12	11	3	3	7	2
Ipsos	27 Feb – 1 Mar 2026	1,000	–	25	24	15	14	11	3	4	4	1
INSA	23–27 Feb 2026	1,203	–	26	25	16	11	10	3	3	6	1
Forschungsgruppe Wahlen	24–26 Feb 2026	1,262	12	26	24	15	12	11	–	–	12	2
INSA	20–23 Feb 2026	2,006	–	25	25	15.5	11	11	3.5	3.5	5.5	Tie
Forsa	17–23 Feb 2026	2,504	28	26	24	14	12	11	3	3	7	2
INSA	16–20 Feb 2026	1,203	–	25	25	16	11	11	3	3	6	Tie
Allensbach	6–19 Feb 2026	1,052	–	27	24	16	12	10	–	4	7	3
INSA	13–16 Feb 2026	2,002	–	25.5	25.5	15.5	11	10	4	3	5.5	Tie
Forsa	10–16 Feb 2026	2,504	26	26	25	14	12	10	3	3	7	1
INSA	9–13 Feb 2026	1,202	–	25	25	16	11	10	4	3	6	Tie
Verian	4–10 Feb 2026	1,472	–	25	24	15	12	11	3	4	6	1
YouGov	6–9 Feb 2026	1,657	–	25	25	16	11	10	4	4	6	Tie
INSA	6–9 Feb 2026	2,004	–	25.5	26	15.5	11	10	4	3	5	0.5
Ipsos	6–8 Feb 2026	1,000	–	23	26	15	13	12	3	4	4	3
Forsa	3–9 Feb 2026	2,503	27	26	24	14	13	11	3	3	6	2
INSA	2–6 Feb 2026	1,202	–	25	26	16	11	10	4	3	5	1
Forschungsgruppe Wahlen	3–5 Feb 2026	1,289	14	26	24	15	13	10	–	–	12	2
Infratest dimap	2–4 Feb 2026	1,319	–	26	24	15	12	10	3	3	7	2
INSA	30 Jan – 2 Feb 2026	2,006	–	26	26	15.5	11.5	10	4	3	4	Tie
Forsa	27 Jan – 2 Feb 2026	2,503	28	26	24	14	12	11	3	3	7	2
INSA	26–30 Jan 2026	1,204	–	26	26	16	11	10	4	3	4	Tie
INSA	23–26 Jan 2026	2,008	–	25	26	14.5	11.5	10.5	4.5	4	4	1
Forsa	20–26 Jan 2026	2,501	28	26	24	14	12	11	3	3	7	2
INSA	19–23 Jan 2026	1,204	–	25	26	15	11	10	4	4	5	1
INSA	16–19 Jan 2026	2,004	–	25	26	14	12	10.5	4	4	4.5	1
Forsa	13–19 Jan 2026	2,501	26	25	26	14	12	10	3	3	7	1
Allensbach	6–19 Jan 2026	1,077	–	27	25	15	11.5	10	–	3.5	8	2
INSA	12–16 Jan 2026	1,202	–	25	26	14	12	11	4	4	4	1
Forschungsgruppe Wahlen	13–15 Jan 2026	1,245	18	26	25	15	12	10	–	–	12	1
Verian	7–13 Jan 2026	1,455	–	26	25	15	13	10	3	3	5	1
pollytix	7–13 Jan 2026	1,573	–	25	26	15	12	10	3	5	4	1
YouGov	9–12 Jan 2026	1,673	–	25	25	16	12	10	3	4	5	Tie
INSA	9–12 Jan 2026	2,010	–	24.5	26	14.5	12	10	4	4	5	1.5
Forsa	5–12 Jan 2026	3,004	26	24	26	13	13	11	3	3	7	2
Ipsos	9–11 Jan 2026	1,000	–	23	26	15	13	11	3	4	5	3
INSA	5–9 Jan 2026	1,205	–	24	26	14	12	11	3	4	6	2
Infratest dimap	5–7 Jan 2026	1,323	–	28	25	13	12	10	3	3	6	3
INSA	2–5 Jan 2026	2,008	–	25	25.5	14.5	11	11	4	3.5	5.5	0.5
GMS	23 Dec – 5 Jan 2026	1,027	–	24	27	15	12	10	4	3	5	3
INSA	30 Dec – 2 Jan 2026	1,004	–	25	26	14	11	11	4	4	5	1
2025 federal election	23 Feb 2025	–	17.5	28.5	20.8	16.4	11.6	8.8	5.0 (Note: Rounded from 4.98%, which is below the threshold for parliamentary representation in Germany.)	4.3	4.6	7.7

=== 2025 ===
Polling firm	Fieldwork date	Sample size	Abs.	Union	AfD	SPD	Grüne	Linke	BSW	FDP	Others	Lead
INSA	19–22 Dec 2025	2,002	–	24.5	26	14	11.5	11	4	3.5	5.5	1.5
Forsa	16–19 Dec 2025	2,003	26	24	26	13	13	11	3	3	7	2
INSA	15–19 Dec 2025	1,201	–	24	26	14	12	11	4	4	5	2
YouGov	12–15 Dec 2025	1,743	–	26	26	14	12	10	4	4	5	Tie
INSA	12–15 Dec 2025	2,006	–	25	26	14	10.5	10.5	4.5	4	5.5	1
Forsa	9–15 Dec 2025	2,503	28	24	26	13	13	11	3	3	7	2
INSA	8–12 Dec 2025	1,201	–	24	26	14	11	11	4	4	6	2
Forschungsgruppe Wahlen	9–11 Dec 2025	1,295	17	26	25	14	12	11	–	–	12	1
Verian	3–9 Dec 2025	1,443	–	25	25	14	12	11	4	3	6	Tie
INSA	5–8 Dec 2025	2,007	–	24.5	26.5	15	10.5	11	4	4	4.5	2
Forsa	2–8 Dec 2025	2,503	26	24	26	14	12	11	3	3	7	2
INSA	1–5 Dec 2025	1,206	–	25	26	15	10	11	4	4	5	1
Allensbach	22 Nov – 4 Dec 2025	1,029	–	27	25	14	12.5	9	3	4.5	5	2
Infratest dimap	1–3 Dec 2025	1,306	–	27	25	14	12	10	4	3	5	2
pollytix	26 Nov – 2 Dec 2025	3,020	–	26	26	15	11	10	4	4	4	Tie
INSA	28 Nov – 1 Dec 2025	2,002	–	24.5	27	14.5	11	10.5	4	3.5	5	2.5
Forsa	25 Nov – 1 Dec 2025	2,501	26	25	26	14	12	11	3	3	6	1
Ipsos	28–30 Nov 2025	1,000	–	23	26	15	13	10	4	4	5	3
INSA	24–28 Nov 2025	1,198	–	25	27	15	11	10	4	3	5	2
INSA	21–24 Nov 2025	2,008	–	25.5	26	15	11	10.5	4	3	5	0.5
Forsa	18–24 Nov 2025	2,501	26	25	26	14	12	11	3	3	6	1
INSA	17–21 Nov 2025	1,208	–	25	26	15	11	10	4	3	6	1
Forschungsgruppe Wahlen	18–20 Nov 2025	1,207	11	27	27	14	12	9	–	–	11	Tie
YouGov	14–17 Nov 2025	2,006	–	27	25	14	11	11	4	4	5	2
INSA	14–17 Nov 2025	2,006	–	24.5	26	15	11	11	4	3.5	5	1.5
Forsa	11–17 Nov 2025	2,502	25	25	26	14	12	11	–	3	9	1
GMS	11–17 Nov 2025	1,020	–	25	26	14	12	11	3	3	6	1
INSA	10–14 Nov 2025	1,203	–	25	26	15	11	11	4	3	5	1
INSA	7–10 Nov 2025	2,010	–	25	26	15.5	11.5	10.5	4	3	4.5	1
Forsa	4–10 Nov 2025	2,503	24	24	26	14	12	11	3	3	7	2
Ipsos	7–9 Nov 2025	1,000	–	24	26	15	12	11	4	4	4	2
INSA	3–7 Nov 2025	1,205	–	25	26	15	12	11	4	3	4	1
Forschungsgruppe Wahlen	4–6 Nov 2025	1,322	13	26	26	14	12	10	–	–	12	Tie
Allensbach	23 Oct – 6 Nov 2025	1,011	–	27	24	15.5	11	10	4	3.5	5	3
Infratest dimap	3–5 Nov 2025	1,300	–	27	26	14	12	10	3	3	5	1
Verian	28 Oct – 4 Nov 2025	1,471	–	26	25	15	12	10	3	3	6	1
INSA	30 Oct – 3 Nov 2025	2,002	–	25.5	25.5	15	11	11	4	3	5	Tie
Forsa	28 Oct – 3 Nov 2025	2,500	23	24	26	14	12	12	3	3	6	2
INSA	27–30 Oct 2025	1,202	–	25	26	15	11	11	4	3	5	1
INSA	24–27 Oct 2025	2,004	–	24.5	26	15	11	11.5	4	3.5	4.5	1.5
Forsa	21–27 Oct 2025	2,502	23	25	26	13	12	12	3	3	6	1
INSA	20–24 Oct 2025	1,205	–	24	26	15	11	11	4	4	5	2
Forschungsgruppe Wahlen	21–23 Oct 2025	1,272	12	27	25	15	11	10	–	–	12	2
INSA	17–20 Oct 2025	2,006	–	24.5	27	14	11	11	4.5	4	4	2.5
Forsa	14–20 Oct 2025	2,505	23	24	26	14	12	11	4	3	6	2
INSA	13–17 Oct 2025	1,200	–	25	27	14	11	11	4	4	4	2
YouGov	10–13 Oct 2025	1,880	–	27	26	14	11	10	4	3	5	1
INSA	10–13 Oct 2025	2,008	–	25	26.5	14	11.5	10.5	4	4	4.5	1.5
Forsa	7–13 Oct 2025	2,500	23	24	26	13	12	12	4	3	6	2
INSA	6–10 Oct 2025	1,224	–	24	26	14	12	11	4	4	5	2
Allensbach	26 Sep – 10 Oct 2025	1,044	–	26	25	15	11	11	4	3	5	1
Verian	30 Sep – 7 Oct 2025	1,478	–	25	25	15	12	10	4	3	6	Tie
INSA	2–6 Oct 2025	2,010	–	24.5	26.5	14.5	11	11.5	4	3.5	4.5	2
Forsa	30 Sep – 6 Oct 2025	2,001	–	24	26	13	12	12	4	3	6	2
Ipsos	2–3 Oct 2025	1,000	–	23	25	15	11	12	5	4	5	2
INSA	29 Sep – 2 Oct 2025	1,186	–	24	26	14	11	12	4	4	5	2
Infratest dimap	29 Sep – 1 Oct 2025	1,306	–	26	26	14	12	10	3	3	6	Tie
Forschungsgruppe Wahlen	29 Sep – 1 Oct 2025	1,300	17	27	25	15	11	11	–	3	8	2
INSA	26–29 Sep 2025	2,006	–	25	26	15.5	11.5	11	4	3	4	1
GMS	24–29 Sep 2025	1,012	–	26	25	15	11	10	3	3	7	1
Forsa	23–29 Sep 2025	2,502	22	24	27	13	12	11	4	3	6	3
INSA	22–26 Sep 2025	1,200	–	25	26	15	12	11	4	3	4	1
INSA	19–22 Sep 2025	2,002	–	24.5	26	14.5	11	11.5	4	3.5	5	1.5
Forsa	16–22 Sep 2025	2,504	–	25	27	13	11	11	4	3	6	2
INSA	15–19 Sep 2025	1,200	–	25	26	15	11	11	4	3	5	1
Forschungsgruppe Wahlen	16–18 Sep 2025	1,419	14	26	26	15	10	11	3	3	6	Tie
Allensbach	5–17 Sep 2025	1,013	–	27	24	15	11	11	3	4	5	3
YouGov	12–15 Sep 2025	1,649	–	26	27	15	11	9	5	4	4	1
INSA	12–15 Sep 2025	2,004	–	25.5	25.5	14.5	11.5	11	4	3	5	Tie
Forsa	9–15 Sep 2025	2,502	–	25	25	14	12	11	4	3	6	Tie
INSA	8–12 Sep 2025	1,204	–	25	25	14	12	11	4	3	6	Tie
Verian	3–9 Sep 2025	1,460	–	26	25	15	11	11	4	3	5	1
INSA	5–8 Sep 2025	2,006	–	25.5	25.5	14.5	11	10	4.5	3.5	5.5	Tie
Forsa	2–8 Sep 2025	2,500	25	25	26	14	11	12	3	3	7	1
Ipsos	5–7 Sep 2025	1,000	–	24	25	15	12	12	4	3	5	1
INSA	1–5 Sep 2025	1,287	–	26	25	15	12	11	4	3	4	1
Forschungsgruppe Wahlen	2–4 Sep 2025	1,269	14	27	25	15	11	10	3	3	6	2
Infratest dimap	1–2 Sep 2025	1,342	–	27	25	14	11	10	4	3	6	2
pollytix	26 Aug – 2 Sep 2025	1,533	–	27	25	16	11	9	5	4	3	2
INSA	29 Aug – 1 Sep 2025	2,004	–	25.5	25	14.5	11	11	4	3.5	5.5	0.5
Forsa	26 Aug – 1 Sep 2025	2,502	25	25	26	14	11	12	3	3	7	1
INSA	25–29 Aug 2025	1,202	–	26	25	15	11	11	4	3	5	1
INSA	22–25 Aug 2025	2,002	–	25	25	15	10.5	11	4.5	3.5	5.5	Tie
Forsa	19–25 Aug 2025	2,501	26	25	26	13	12	11	3	3	7	1
INSA	18–22 Aug 2025	1,201	–	25	25	15	11	11	4	3	6	Tie
YouGov	15–18 Aug 2025	1,831	–	27	25	14	12	10	5	3	4	2
INSA	15–18 Aug 2025	2,010	–	26	25	14.5	11	10	5	4	4.5	1
Forsa	12–18 Aug 2025	2,502	–	25	26	13	12	12	3	3	6	1
INSA	11–15 Aug 2025	1,206	–	26	25	15	11	9	4	4	6	1
Allensbach	1–14 Aug 2025	1,051	–	28	22.5	16	11	10	4	4	4.5	5.5
Forschungsgruppe Wahlen	11–13 Aug 2025	1,370	15	27	23	15	12	11	3	3	6	4
Verian	6–12 Aug 2025	1,464	–	26	25	14	12	10	3	4	6	1
INSA	8–11 Aug 2025	2,008	–	27	25	14.5	10.5	9.5	4.5	3.5	5.5	2
Forsa	5–11 Aug 2025	2,505	25	24	26	13	13	11	4	3	6	2
INSA	3–8 Aug 2025	1,204	–	27	25	15	11	9	4	4	5	2
Infratest dimap	4–6 Aug 2025	1,321	–	27	24	13	12	10	3	4	7	3
INSA	1–4 Aug 2025	2,004	–	27.5	25	14.5	10.5	9.5	4.5	3	5.5	2.5
Forsa	29 Jul – 4 Aug 2025	2,503	24	25	25	13	12	12	4	3	6	Tie
Ipsos	1–3 Aug 2025	1,000	–	25	25	15	11	11	5	3	5	Tie
INSA	28 Jul – 1 Aug 2025	1,203	–	27	25	15	11	10	4	3	5	2
Verian	23–29 Jul 2025	1,473	–	27	24	14	12	11	3	4	5	3
INSA	25–28 Jul 2025	2,006	–	27.5	24	14.5	10.5	10	4.5	3.5	5.5	3.5
Forsa	22–28 Jul 2025	2,502	24	26	25	13	12	12	3	3	6	1
INSA	21–25 Jul 2025	1,203	–	27	24	15	11	10	4	3	6	3
Forschungsgruppe Wahlen	22–24 Jul 2025	1,367	13	27	24	15	11	11	3	3	6	3
INSA	18–21 Jul 2025	2,005	–	27.5	24	14	10.5	10.5	4.5	3.5	5.5	3.5
Forsa	15–21 Jul 2025	2,502	–	25	25	13	12	12	4	3	6	Tie
INSA	14–18 Jul 2025	1,205	–	27	24	15	11	11	5	3	4	3
Allensbach	4–16 Jul 2025	1,054	–	29	23	15	12	9	3.5	4	4.5	6
YouGov	11–14 Jul 2025	1,820	–	27	25	14	11	10	5	3	5	2
INSA	11–14 Jul 2025	2,004	–	27.5	23.5	15	11	10.5	4.5	3.5	4.5	4
Forsa	8–14 Jul 2025	2,503	–	26	24	13	12	11	4	4	6	2
INSA	7–11 Jul 2025	1,202	–	28	24	15	11	11	4	3	4	4
INSA	4–7 Jul 2025	2,007	–	28	23.5	14.5	11	11	4.5	3.5	4	4.5
Forsa	1–7 Jul 2025	2,503	–	27	24	13	12	11	4	3	6	3
Ipsos	4–5 Jul 2025	1,000	–	26	24	15	12	12	4	3	4	2
INSA	30 Jun – 4 Jul 2025	1,205	–	28	24	15	11	11	4	4	3	4
Infratest dimap	30 Jun – 2 Jul 2025	1,312	–	30	23	13	12	10	4	3	5	7
INSA	27–30 Jun 2025	2,008	–	28	23.5	15.5	11.5	9.5	5	3.5	3.5	4.5
GMS	25–30 Jun 2025	1,007	–	29	22	15	13	9	3	4	5	7
Forsa	24–30 Jun 2025	2,501	24	28	24	14	11	11	3	3	6	4
INSA	23–27 Jun 2025	1,202	–	28	24	16	11	9	5	3	4	4
Forschungsgruppe Wahlen	24–26 Jun 2025	1,378	13	29	22	15	12	10	3	3	6	7
INSA	20–23 Jun 2025	2,002	–	27.5	23	16	11.5	10	4.5	4	3.5	4.5
Forsa	17–20 Jun 2025	2,003	21	28	24	14	11	11	3	3	6	4
INSA	16–20 Jun 2025	1,205	–	28	23	16	11	9	4	4	5	5
Verian	11–17 Jun 2025	1,462	–	28	23	15	12	10	4	3	5	5
YouGov	13–16 Jun 2025	1,912	–	28	23	14	12	8	5	3	5	5
INSA	13–16 Jun 2025	2,006	–	27	23	16	11.5	10.5	4	4	4	4
Forsa	10–16 Jun 2025	2,502	–	28	23	14	11	10	4	4	6	5
INSA	10–13 Jun 2025	1,203	–	27	23	17	11	10	4	4	4	4
Allensbach	1–12 Jun 2025	1,054	–	29	23	16	11	9	4	4	4	6
INSA	6–10 Jun 2025	2,004	–	27.5	22.5	16	11	10	4.5	4	4.5	5
Forsa	3–6 Jun 2025	2,002	21	27	24	14	11	11	3	4	6	3
INSA	2–6 Jun 2025	1,202	–	27	23	16	11	10	4	4	5	4
Forschungsgruppe Wahlen	3–5 Jun 2025	1,247	13	27	23	15	12	11	3	3	6	4
Infratest dimap	2–3 Jun 2025	1,292	–	29	23	15	12	9	4	4	4	6
INSA	30 May – 2 Jun 2025	2,002	–	26.5	24.5	16	10.5	10.5	4	4	4	2
pollytix	28 May – 2 Jun 2025	1,561	–	27	23	16	11	10	5	3	5	4
Forsa	27 May – 2 Jun 2025	2,002	20	27	23	15	12	11	3	3	6	4
Ipsos	30 May – 1 Jun 2025	1,000	–	27	23	16	11	11	4	3	5	4
INSA	26–30 May 2025	2,002	–	26	24	17	10	11	4	4	4	2
INSA	23–26 May 2025	2,006	–	26	24.5	16	11	10	4.5	3.5	4.5	1.5
Forsa	20–26 May 2025	2,501	20	26	24	15	11	11	3	4	6	2
INSA	19–23 May 2025	1,198	–	27	24	16	11	10	4	4	4	3
Forschungsgruppe Wahlen	20–22 May 2025	1,328	10	26	23	16	12	10	3	4	6	3
Verian	14–20 May 2025	1,468	–	26	23	15	12	11	4	3	6	3
INSA	16–19 May 2025	2,008	–	26	24.5	15.5	11	10	4	3.5	5.5	1.5
GMS	14–19 May 2025	1,012	–	26	23	14	12	10	4	4	7	3
Forsa	13–19 May 2025	2,504	20	26	24	15	11	11	3	4	6	2
INSA	12–16 May 2025	1,205	–	26	25	16	11	10	4	3	5	1
pollytix	13–15 Apr 2025	1,514	–	27	25	15	11	10	5	3	4	2
Allensbach	3–14 May 2025	1,032	–	28	22.5	17	11	10	4	3	4.5	5.5
YouGov	9–12 May 2025	1,927	–	27	25	15	12	9	4	3	4	2
INSA	9–12 May 2025	2,004	–	25	24.5	16	11	10	4	3.5	6	0.5
Forsa	5–12 May 2025	3,001	–	25	25	15	11	10	4	3	7	Tie
Ipsos	9–10 May 2025	1,000	–	25	25	15	12	10	5	4	4	Tie
INSA	5–9 May 2025	1,203	–	25	24	16	11	10	4	4	6	1
Infratest dimap	5–6 May 2025	1,325	–	27	23	16	11	10	4	4	5	4
INSA	2–5 May 2025	2,003	–	24.5	24.5	16	11	10	4	4	6	Tie
Forsa	29 Apr – 2 May 2025	1,503	21	25	25	15	12	10	3	3	7	Tie
INSA	28 Apr – 2 May 2025	1,204	–	25	24	16	12	10	4	4	5	1
Forschungsgruppe Wahlen	28–30 Apr 2025	1,297	9	27	23	15	11	10	3	4	7	4
Wahlkreisprognose	27–30 Apr 2025	1,000	–	26	24.5	16.5	12	10.5	3.5	4	3	1.5
YouGov	25–28 Apr 2025	2,275	–	26	26	14	12	10	5	4	3	Tie
INSA	25–28 Apr 2025	2,006	–	25	25	15.5	11	10	4	3	6.5	Tie
Forsa	22–28 Apr 2025	2,004	22	24	26	14	12	10	4	3	7	2
INSA	22–25 Apr 2025	1,204	–	25	25	15	12	10	4	3	6	Tie
INSA	17–22 Apr 2025	2,010	–	25	25	15	11	10	5	3.5	5.5	Tie
Verian	15–22 Apr 2025	1,469	–	26	24	16	12	9	4	3	6	2
Forsa	15–17 Apr 2025	1,502	–	25	26	15	11	9	4	4	6	1
INSA	14–17 Apr 2025	1,205	–	25	24	16	11	10	5	4	5	1
INSA	11–14 Apr 2025	2,002	–	25.5	24.5	16	11	10	4.5	3.5	5	1
Forsa	8–14 Apr 2025	2,502	21	25	24	15	12	10	4	3	7	1
INSA	7–11 Apr 2025	1,202	–	25	24	16	11	10	5	3	6	1
Forschungsgruppe Wahlen	8–10 Apr 2025	1,322	9	26	24	15	12	10	3	4	6	2
Allensbach	28 Mar – 9 Apr 2025	1,048	–	27	23.5	16	12	10	4	3	4.5	3.5
INSA	4–7 Apr 2025	2,008	–	24.5	24.5	16	10.5	10.5	4.5	4	5.5	Tie
GMS	2–7 Apr 2025	1,022	–	26	25	15	11	10	4	4	5	1
Forsa	1–7 Apr 2025	2,501	19	25	24	15	12	10	4	3	7	1
Ipsos	4–5 Apr 2025	1,000	–	24	25	15	11	11	5	4	5	1
INSA	31 Mar – 4 Apr 2025	1,206	–	24	24	16	11	11	4	4	6	Tie
Infratest dimap	31 Mar – 2 Apr 2025	1,334	–	26	24	16	11	10	4	4	5	2
INSA	28–31 Mar 2025	2,006	–	26.5	23.5	15.5	12	10.5	4.5	3.5	4	3
Forsa	25–31 Mar 2025	2,508	–	25	24	15	12	10	4	4	6	1
INSA	24–28 Mar 2025	1,204	–	26	23	16	12	10	5	3	5	3
Verian	19–25 Mar 2025	1,381	–	27	22	15	13	10	4	3	6	5
YouGov	21–24 Mar 2025	1,890	–	26	24	15	12	10	5	3	4	2
INSA	21–24 Mar 2025	2,004	–	27	23.5	14.5	12	10.5	4.5	3.5	4.5	3.5
Forsa	18–24 Mar 2025	2,502	–	26	23	15	12	10	4	4	6	3
INSA	17–21 Mar 2025	1,202	–	27	23	15	12	10	5	3	5	4
Forschungsgruppe Wahlen	18–20 Mar 2025	1,305	11	27	22	16	12	10	3	4	6	5
INSA	14–17 Mar 2025	2,008	–	29	22	15.5	11	10.5	5	3	4	7
Forsa	11–17 Mar 2025	2,501	–	27	23	14	12	11	3	4	6	4
INSA	10–14 Mar 2025	1,201	–	28	22	16	11	10	5	3	5	6
Allensbach	27 Feb – 11 Mar 2025	1,031	–	29	21	16	11.5	10	4	3	5	8
INSA	7–10 Mar 2025	2,003	–	28.5	22	16.5	10.5	10.5	4.5	3.5	4	6.5
Forsa	4–10 Mar 2025	2,504	–	28	22	15	11	11	3	4	6	6
INSA	3–7 Mar 2025	1,201	–	28	21	16	11	10	5	4	5	7
Forschungsgruppe Wahlen	4–6 Mar 2025	1,249	8	28	21	15	13	10	3	4	6	7
Infratest dimap	4–5 Mar 2025	1,325	–	29	21	16	12	9	5	3	5	8
INSA	28 Feb – 3 Mar 2025	2,002	–	29.5	22	15.5	11	9.5	5	3.5	4	7.5
Forsa	24 Feb – 3 Mar 2025	3,001	16	28	22	15	11	12	3	3	6	6
Ipsos	28 Feb – 1 Mar 2025	1,000	–	29	22	15	12	9	5	4	5	7
INSA	24–28 Feb 2025	1,001	–	30	22	15	11	9	5	4	4	8
2025 federal election	23 Feb 2025	–	17.5	28.5	20.8	16.4	11.6	8.8	5.0	4.3	4.6	7.7

=== CDU and CSU ===
Some polls show CDU (not present in Bavaria) and CSU (only in Bavaria) separately without adding them up.

Polling firm	Fieldwork date	Sample size	CDU	AfD	SPD	Grüne	Linke	CSU	BSW	FDP	Others	Lead
INSA	13–16 Nov 2026	2,006	14.3	28.0	14.0	15.0	9.5	4.7	3.5	4.5	6.5	13.0
INSA	6–9 Nov 2026	2,004	15.2	28.5	14.0	14.5	9.5	4.3	3.5	5.0	5.5	13.3
INSA	30 Oct – 2 Nov 2026	2,004	15.3	28.0	14.0	15.0	10.0	4.7	3.5	5.0	4.5	12.7
INSA	23–26 Oct 2026	2,010	14.3	29.5	14.0	14.0	10.0	4.7	3.0	5.0	5.5	15.2
INSA	16–19 Oct 2026	2,002	13.8	30.0	14.0	14.0	11.0	4.2	3.5	5.0	4.5	16.0
INSA	9–12 Oct 2026	2,006	14.6	30.0	13.5	14.0	10.0	3.9	3.5	4.5	6.0	15.4
INSA	2–5 Oct 2026	2,002	13.5	30.5	14.5	14.5	10.5	4.0	3.5	4.5	4.5	16.0
INSA	25–28 Sep 2026	2,001	14.4	29.5	14.5	14.5	10.0	4.6	3.5	4.0	5.0	15.0
INSA	18–21 Sep 2026	2,004	14.5	29.5	13.5	13.5	10.5	5.0	3.5	4.5	5.5	15.0
INSA	11–14 Sep 2026	2,006	15.1	29.0	12.5	14.0	10.5	4.4	3.5	4.5	6.5	13.9
INSA	4–7 Sep 2026	2,010	14.6	29.0	12.5	13.5	10.5	4.9	4.0	4.5	6.5	14.4
INSA	28–31 Aug 2026	2,002	15.1	29.0	12.0	13.5	10.5	5.4	3.5	4.5	6.5	13.9
INSA	21–24 Aug 2026	2,004	14.4	29.0	12.0	13.5	11.0	6.1	3.0	4.5	6.5	14.6
INSA	14–17 Aug 2026	2,006	15.5	28.5	12.0	13.0	12.0	5.0	3.0	5.0	6.0	13.0
INSA	7–10 Aug 2026	2,010	15.2	28.5	12.5	13.0	11.5	5.3	3.0	4.5	6.5	13.3
INSA	31 Jul – 3 Aug 2026	2,004	15.6	28.0	12.0	13.5	11.0	5.4	4.0	5.0	5.5	12.4
INSA	24–27 Jul 2026	2,006	16.1	28.0	12.5	13.5	11.0	4.9	4.0	4.0	6.0	11.9
INSA	17–20 Jul 2026	2,005	15.8	29.0	13.0	13.0	10.5	4.7	3.5	4.5	6.0	13.2
INSA	10–13 Jul 2026	2,006	16.5	28.5	12.5	13.0	10.5	5.0	4.0	4.0	6.0	12.0
INSA	3–6 Jul 2026	2,010	17.6	29.0	12.5	13.0	10.5	4.4	4.0	4.0	5.0	11.4
INSA	26–29 Jun 2026	2,006	17.5	29.0	12.0	13.0	10.5	4.5	3.5	4.0	6.0	11.5
INSA	19–22 Jun 2026	2,008	17.1	29.0	12.5	13.0	10.5	4.4	3.5	4.0	6.0	11.9
INSA	12–15 Jun 2026	2,003	17.6	29.0	12.0	14.5	10.5	4.4	3.5	3.5	5.0	11.4
INSA	5–8 Jun 2026	2,009	16.3	29.0	12.0	14.5	10.5	4.7	3.5	3.5	6.0	12.7
INSA	29 May – 1 Jun 2026	2,006	17.0	29.0	12.0	13.5	10.5	5.0	3.5	3.5	6.0	12.0
INSA	22–26 May 2026	2,010	17.0	29.0	12.0	14.0	10.5	5.0	3.0	4.0	5.5	12.0
INSA	15–18 May 2026	2,005	16.6	29.0	12.5	14.0	10.5	5.4	3.5	3.5	5.0	12.4
INSA	8–11 May 2026	2,006	18.1	28.0	13.0	12.5	11.0	4.9	3.5	3.5	5.5	9.9
INSA	2–7 Apr 2026	2,002	19.0	26.0	13.0	12.0	10.5	6.0	4.0	3.5	6.0	7.0
INSA	27–30 Mar 2026	2,006	20.5	26.0	14.5	12.0	10.5	5.5	3.5	3.0	4.5	5.5
INSA	20–23 Mar 2026	2,010	19.8	26.0	15.0	12.0	10.0	6.2	3.5	3.0	4.5	6.2
INSA	13–16 Mar 2026	2,002	20.2	26.0	15.0	12.0	10.5	5.3	3.5	3.0	4.5	5.8
INSA	6–9 Mar 2026	2,003	19.1	24.5	15.5	11.5	10.5	6.9	3.5	3.5	5.0	5.4
INSA	27 Feb – 2 Mar 2026	2,002	20.2	25.0	16.0	11.5	10.0	5.3	3.5	3.0	5.5	4.8
INSA	20–23 Feb 2026	2,006	19.9	25.0	15.5	11.0	11.0	5.1	3.5	3.5	5.5	5.1
INSA	13–16 Feb 2026	2,002	19.0	25.5	15.5	11.0	10.0	6.5	4.0	3.0	5.5	6.5
INSA	6–9 Feb 2026	2,004	19.5	26.0	15.5	11.0	10.0	6.0	4.0	3.0	5.0	6.5
INSA	30 Jan – 2 Feb 2026	2,006	20.0	26.0	15.5	11.5	10.0	6.0	4.0	3.0	4.0	6.0
INSA	23–26 Jan 2026	2,008	19.9	26.0	14.5	11.5	10.5	5.1	4.5	4.0	4.0	6.1
INSA	9–12 Jan 2026	2,010	18.3	26.0	14.5	12.0	10.0	6.2	4.0	4.0	5.0	7.7
INSA	2–5 Jan 2026	2,008	19.0	25.5	14.5	11.0	11.0	6.0	4.0	3.5	5.5	6.5
INSA	19–22 Dec 2025	2,002	18.5	26.0	14.0	11.5	11.0	6.0	4.0	3.5	5.5	7.5
INSA	12–15 Dec 2025	2,006	19.4	26.0	14.0	10.5	10.5	5.6	4.5	4.0	5.5	6.6
INSA	5–8 Dec 2025	2,007	18.0	26.5	15.0	10.5	11.0	6.5	4.0	4.0	4.5	8.5
INSA	28 Nov – 1 Dec 2025	2,002	19.1	27.0	14.5	11.0	10.5	5.4	4.0	3.5	5.0	7.9
INSA	21–24 Nov 2025	2,008	19.3	26.0	15.0	11.0	10.5	6.2	4.0	3.0	5.0	6.7
INSA	14–17 Nov 2025	2,006	19.5	26.0	15.0	11.0	11.0	5.0	4.0	3.5	5.0	6.5
INSA	7–10 Nov 2025	2,010	19.1	26.0	15.5	11.5	10.5	5.9	4.0	3.0	4.5	6.9
INSA	30 Oct – 3 Nov 2025	2,002	20.6	25.5	15.0	11.0	11.0	4.9	4.0	3.0	5.0	4.9
INSA	24–27 Oct 2025	2,004	19.5	26.0	15.0	11.0	11.5	5.0	4.0	3.5	4.5	6.5
INSA	17–20 Oct 2025	2,006	19.7	27.0	14.0	11.0	11.0	4.8	4.5	4.0	4.0	7.3
INSA	10–13 Oct 2025	2,008	19.5	26.5	14.0	11.5	10.5	5.5	4.0	4.0	4.5	7.0
INSA	2–6 Oct 2025	2,010	19.0	26.5	14.5	11.0	11.5	5.5	4.0	3.5	4.5	7.5
INSA	26–29 Sep 2025	2,006	20.0	26.0	15.5	11.5	11.0	5.0	4.0	3.0	4.0	6.0
INSA	19–22 Sep 2025	2,002	19.5	26.0	14.5	11.0	11.5	5.0	4.0	3.5	5.0	6.5
INSA	12–15 Sep 2025	2,004	19.5	25.5	14.5	11.5	11.0	6.0	4.0	3.0	5.0	6.0
INSA	5–8 Sep 2025	2,006	19.5	25.5	14.5	11.0	10.0	6.0	4.5	3.5	5.5	6.0
INSA	29 Aug – 1 Sep 2025	2,004	19.0	25.0	14.5	11.0	11.0	6.5	4.0	3.5	5.5	6.0
INSA	22–25 Aug 2025	2,002	18.5	25.0	15.0	10.5	11.0	6.5	4.5	3.5	5.5	6.5
INSA	15–18 Aug 2025	2,010	21.5	25.0	14.5	11.0	10.0	4.5	5.0	4.0	4.5	3.5
INSA	8–11 Aug 2025	2,008	21.0	25.0	14.5	10.5	9.5	6.0	4.5	3.5	5.5	4.0
INSA	1–4 Aug 2025	2,004	22.0	25.0	14.5	10.5	9.5	5.5	4.5	3.0	5.5	3.0
INSA	25–28 Jul 2025	2,006	21.5	24.0	14.5	10.5	10.0	6.0	4.5	3.5	5.5	2.5
INSA	18–21 Jul 2025	2,005	21.0	24.0	14.0	10.5	10.5	6.5	4.5	3.5	5.5	3.0
INSA	11–14 Jul 2025	2,004	21.0	23.5	15.0	11.0	10.5	6.5	4.5	3.5	4.5	2.5
INSA	4–7 Jul 2025	2,007	22.0	23.5	14.5	11.0	11.0	6.0	4.5	3.5	4.0	1.5
INSA	27–30 Jun 2025	2,008	22.5	23.5	15.5	11.5	9.5	5.5	5.0	3.5	3.5	1.0
INSA	20–23 Jun 2025	2,002	21.5	23.0	16.0	11.5	10.0	6.0	4.5	4.0	3.5	1.5
INSA	13–16 Jun 2025	2,006	21.5	23.0	16.0	11.5	10.5	5.5	4.0	4.0	4.0	1.5
INSA	6–10 Jun 2025	2,004	20.5	22.5	16.0	11.0	10.0	7.0	4.5	4.0	4.5	2.0
INSA	30 May – 2 Jun 2025	2,002	21.0	24.5	16.0	10.5	10.5	5.5	4.0	4.0	4.0	3.5
INSA	23–26 May 2025	2,006	21.0	24.5	16.0	11.0	10.0	5.0	4.5	3.5	4.5	3.5
INSA	16–19 May 2025	2,008	20.5	24.5	15.5	11.0	10.0	5.5	4.0	3.5	5.5	4.0
INSA	9–12 May 2025	2,004	20.5	24.5	16.0	11.0	10.0	4.5	4.0	3.5	6.0	4.0
INSA	2–5 May 2025	2,003	19.0	24.5	16.0	11.0	10.0	5.5	4.0	4.0	6.0	5.5
INSA	25–28 Apr 2025	2,006	19.5	25.0	15.5	11.0	10.0	5.5	4.0	3.0	6.5	5.5
INSA	17–22 Apr 2025	2,010	19.5	25.0	15.0	11.0	10.0	5.5	5.0	3.5	5.5	5.5
INSA	11–14 Apr 2025	2,002	20.0	24.5	16.0	11.0	10.0	5.5	4.5	3.5	5.0	4.5
INSA	4–7 Apr 2025	2,008	18.5	24.5	16.0	10.5	10.5	6.0	4.5	4.0	5.5	6.0
INSA	28–31 Mar 2025	2,006	21.0	23.5	15.5	12.0	10.5	5.5	4.5	3.5	4.0	2.5
INSA	21–24 Mar 2025	2,004	21.0	23.5	14.5	12.0	10.5	6.0	4.5	3.5	4.5	2.5
INSA	14–17 Mar 2025	2,008	23.5	22.0	15.5	11.0	10.5	5.5	5.0	3.0	4.0	1.5
INSA	7–10 Mar 2025	2,003	22.5	22.0	16.5	10.5	10.5	6.0	4.5	3.5	4.0	0.5
INSA	28 Feb – 3 Mar 2025	2,002	23.0	22.0	15.5	11.0	9.5	6.5	5.0	3.5	4.0	1.0
2025 federal election	23 Feb 2025	–	22.6	20.8	16.4	11.6	8.8	6.0	5.0	4.3	4.6	1.8

=== Scenario polls ===
==== Nation-wide CSU ====
Polling firm	Fieldwork date	Sample size	CDU	AfD	SPD	Grüne	Linke	CSU	BSW	FDP	Others	Lead
INSA	29 Aug – 1 Sep 2025	2,004	20	24	12.5	11	10	12.5	3.5	2.5	4	4
2025 federal election	23 Feb 2025	–	22.6	20.8	16.4	11.6	8.8	6.0	4.98	4.3	4.6	1.8

==== Voting intention after hypothetical AfD ban ====
Polling firm	Fieldwork date	Sample size	Union	AfD	SPD	Grüne	Linke	BSW	FDP	Others	Lead
INSA	5–9 May 2025	1,203	30	banned	19	13	12	11	6	9	11
2025 federal election	23 Feb 2025	–	28.5	20.8	16.4	11.6	8.8	4.98	4.3	4.6	7.7

==== CDU/CSU open to a coalition with AfD ====
Polling firm	Fieldwork date	Sample size	Union	AfD	SPD	Grüne	Linke	BSW	FDP	Others	Lead
INSA	29 May – 1 Jun 2026	2,006	17.5	28	14	13.5	11	4.5	4	7.5	10.5
2025 federal election	23 Feb 2025	–	28.5	20.8	16.4	11.6	8.8	4.98	4.3	4.6	7.7

== By state ==
=== Bavaria ===
Polling firm	Fieldwork date	Sample size	CSU	AfD	Grüne	SPD	Linke	FW	FDP	BSW	Others	Lead
Forsa	1–10 Sep 2025	1,012	33	24	13	9	8	3	3	2	5	9
2025 federal election	23 Feb 2025	–	37.2	19.0	12.0	11.5	5.7	4.3	4.2	3.1	2.9	18.2

=== Mecklenburg-Vorpommern ===
Polling firm	Fieldwork date	Sample size	AfD	CDU	SPD	Linke	BSW	Grüne	FDP	Others	Lead
Forsa	21–27 Aug 2026	1,047	40	14	13	14	5	7	–	7	26
Infratest dimap	2–6 Jul 2026	1,167	38	15	17	13	4	7	–	6	21
Infratest dimap	7–11 May 2026	1,153	38	15	15	15	5	6	–	6	23
Forsa	9–16 Feb 2026	1,003	39	15	13	12	7	6	2	6	24
Infratest dimap	21–24 Jan 2026	1,145	37	18	15	12	7	5	–	6	19
2025 federal election	23 Feb 2025	–	35.0	17.8	12.4	12.0	10.6	5.4	3.2	3.3	17.2

=== North Rhine-Westphalia ===
Polling firm	Fieldwork date	Sample size	CDU	SPD	AfD	Grüne	Linke	FDP	BSW	Others	Lead
Forsa	7–18 Sep 2026	1,030	22	14	24	18	12	3	–	7	2
Forsa	7–14 Apr 2026	1,531	26	13	22	18	9	4	–	8	4
Forsa	25 Jun – 2 Jul 2025	1,507	30	18	18	13	9	4	3	5	12
2025 federal election	23 Feb 2025	–	30.1	20.0	16.8	12.4	8.3	4.4	4.1	3.9	11.1

== By Western and Eastern Germany ==
=== Western Germany ===
Polling firm	Fieldwork date	Sample size	Union	AfD	SPD	Grüne	Linke	BSW	FDP	Others	Lead
YouGov	13–16 Nov 2026	1,382 in West Germany	21	26	16	16	9	–	5	8	5
YouGov	16–19 Oct 2026	1,395 in West Germany	20	25	15	18	9	3	5	6	5
YouGov	11–14 Sep 2026	1,403 in West Germany	19	26	14	18	10	3	5	5	7
YouGov	14–17 Aug 2026	1,361 in West Germany	22	26	14	16	10	3	5	5	4
YouGov	10–13 Jul 2026	1,480 in West Germany	21	25	12	16	11	4	5	6	4
INSA	10–13 Jul 2026	2,006 in all of Germany	23	25.5	14	14	10	3.5	4	4	2.5
YouGov	12–15 Jun 2026	1,397 in West Germany	22	26	13	15	11	4	5	5	4
INSA	12–15 Jun 2026	2,003 in all of Germany	24	26.5	13	16	10	2.5	4	4	2.5
YouGov	8–11 May 2026	1,366 in West Germany	24	25	14	15	10	3	4	5	1
INSA	17–20 Apr 2026	2,003 in all of Germany	25	24	15	14	11	2	4	5	1
YouGov	10–13 Apr 2026	1,364 in West Germany	25	25	13	16	9	3	4	5	Tie
YouGov	13–16 Mar 2026	1,444 in West Germany	28	23	14	14	8	3	4	5	5
INSA	6–9 Mar 2026	2,003 in all of Germany	27	22	16	13	10	3	4	5	5
YouGov	6–9 Feb 2026	1,278 in West Germany	26	22	17	12	9	3	4	6	4
YouGov	9–12 Jan 2026	1,314 in West Germany	26	23	17	13	9	2	4	6	3
YouGov	12–15 Dec 2025	1,319 in West Germany	28	23	15	13	8	4	4	5	5
INSA	5–8 Dec 2025	2,007 in all of Germany	27	23.5	15.5	11.5	10.5	2.5	4.5	5	3.5
YouGov	14–17 Nov 2025	1,540 in West Germany	29	23	15	12	10	3	4	5	6
INSA	17–20 Oct 2025	2,006 in all of Germany	26	24	14	12	11	4	5	4	2
YouGov	10–13 Oct 2025	1,465 in West Germany	29	24	15	12	9	3	4	5	5
YouGov	12–15 Sep 2025	1,285 in West Germany	28	24	16	12	8	4	4	4	4
INSA	5–8 Sep 2025	2,006 in all of Germany	27	23	15	12	9	4	4	6	4
YouGov	15–18 Aug 2025	1,418 in West Germany	29	23	15	13	9	4	4	4	6
INSA	8–11 Aug 2025	2,008 in all of Germany	29	22	16	12	8	4	3	6	7
YouGov	11–14 Jul 2025	1,420 in West Germany	29	22	15	12	10	4	3	5	7
INSA	27–30 Jun 2025	2,008 in all of Germany	29	21	17	12	9	4	4	4	8
YouGov	13–16 Jun 2025	1,491 in West Germany	30	21	16	14	7	4	4	5	9
YouGov	9–12 May 2025	1,477 in West Germany	29	22	16	14	8	3	3	5	7
YouGov	25–28 Apr 2025	1,520 in West Germany	28	23	15	12	10	4	4	3	5
INSA	11–14 Apr 2025	2,002 in all of Germany	28	21	17	12	9	4	4	5	7
YouGov	21–24 Mar 2025	1,451 in West Germany	29	21	16	13	9	5	4	5	8
2025 federal election	23 Feb 2025	–	30.7	17.9	17.6	12.7	7.9	4.6	3.9	4.8	12.8

=== Eastern Germany ===
Polling firm	Fieldwork date	Sample size	AfD	CDU	Linke	SPD	BSW	Grüne	FDP	Others	Lead
YouGov	13–16 Nov 2026	408 in East Germany	43	10	14	9	–	12	5	6	29
YouGov	16–19 Oct 2026	378 in East Germany	38	12	15	12	4	8	5	6	23
YouGov	11–14 Sep 2026	384 in East Germany	39	12	12	12	7	10	4	4	27
Forsa	1–7 Sep 2026	2,502 in all of Germany	45	12	15	9	5	9	–	5	30
YouGov	14–17 Aug 2026	383 in East Germany	35	15	18	8	4	10	4	6	17
YouGov	10–13 Jul 2026	347 in East Germany	36	12	17	9	6	9	4	7	19
INSA	10–13 Jul 2026	2,006 in all of Germany	40	14.5	13	8	6	9	4	5.5	25.5
YouGov	12–15 Jun 2026	396 in East Germany	39	12	16	9	4	9	5	5	23
INSA	12–15 Jun 2026	2,003 in all of Germany	40	14.5	12.5	8.5	7	8.5	1.5	7.5	25.5
YouGov	8–11 May 2026	417 in East Germany	40	16	14	9	6	8	3	5	24
INSA	17–20 Apr 2026	2,003 in all of Germany	38	19	12	11	8	7	1	4	19
YouGov	10–13 Apr 2026	399 in East Germany	39	15	13	9	6	7	6	6	24
YouGov	13–16 Mar 2026	407 in East Germany	37	18	14	11	4	9	1	6	19
INSA	6–9 Mar 2026	2,003 in all of Germany	37	20	12	13	7	5	3	3	17
YouGov	6–9 Feb 2026	379 in East Germany	35	18	13	12	6	7	4	5	17
YouGov	9–12 Jan 2026	359 in East Germany	35	21	13	9	6	7	5	4	14
YouGov	12–15 Dec 2025	424 in East Germany	36	16	15	10	6	9	4	4	20
INSA	5–8 Dec 2025	2,007 in all of Germany	39.5	14	12	12.5	10.5	7	2.5	2	25.5
YouGov	14–17 Nov 2025	465 in East Germany	35	18	16	11	5	7	5	4	17
INSA	17–20 Oct 2025	2,006 in all of Germany	40	19	12	12	8	5	2	2	21
YouGov	10–13 Oct 2025	415 in East Germany	36	18	17	9	7	7	2	4	18
YouGov	12–15 Sep 2025	364 in East Germany	37	17	11	10	8	8	4	5	20
INSA	5–8 Sep 2025	2,006 in all of Germany	36	19	15	13	7	7	2	1	17
YouGov	15–18 Aug 2025	413 in East Germany	36	18	13	9	9	6	3	5	18
INSA	8–11 Aug 2025	2,008 in all of Germany	37	17	15	10	7	4	4	6	20
YouGov	11–14 Jul 2025	400 in East Germany	36	17	13	9	7	7	4	6	19
INSA	27–30 Jun 2025	2,008 in all of Germany	34	23	13	10	9	7	2	2	11
YouGov	13–16 Jun 2025	421 in East Germany	32	22	14	10	7	9	2	5	10
YouGov	9–12 May 2025	450 in East Germany	36	19	12	10	8	7	5	2	17
YouGov	25–28 Apr 2025	467 in East Germany	35	17	12	11	8	8	4	5	18
INSA	11–14 Apr 2025	2,002 in all of Germany	38	18	12	10	8	7	3	4	20
YouGov	21–24 Mar 2025	439 in East Germany	35	18	15	11	7	8	2	3	17
2025 federal election	23 Feb 2025	–	34.6	18.4	12.8	10.9	9.9	6.5	3.1	3.7	16.2

== Chancellor polling ==
=== Merz vs. Weidel ===
Polling firm	Fieldwork date	Sample size	Merz Union	Weidel AfD	None	Don't know
INSA	11–14 Sep 2026	2,006	17	31	45	7
INSA	31 Jul – 3 Aug 2026	2,004	17	29	48	6
INSA	15–18 May 2026	2,005	22	33	36	9
INSA	30 Oct – 3 Nov 2025	2,002	27	29	35	9
INSA	19–22 Sep 2025	2,002	27	29	34	10
INSA	27–30 Jun 2025	2,008	36	27	31	6
INSA	11–14 Apr 2025	2,002	34	26	33	7
INSA	28–31 Mar 2025	2,006	35	27	33	5
INSA	21–24 Mar 2025	2,004	37	28	29	6

=== Wüst vs. Weidel ===
Polling firm	Fieldwork date	Sample size	Wüst Union	Weidel AfD	None	Don't know
INSA	11–14 Sep 2026	2,006	29	30	31	10
INSA	31 Jul – 3 Aug 2026	2,004	25	31	36	8

=== Söder vs. Weidel ===
Polling firm	Fieldwork date	Sample size	Söder Union	Weidel AfD	None	Don't know
INSA	11–14 Sep 2026	2,006	34	26	32	8

=== Merz vs. Weidel vs. Klingbeil ===
Polling firm	Fieldwork date	Sample size	Merz Union	Weidel AfD	Klingbeil SPD	None	Don't know
INSA	18–19 Dec 2025	1,001	20	26	12	31	11

== Preferred coalition ==
Polling firm	Fieldwork date	Sample size	Union AfD (Note: Coalition would break the cordon sanitaire/firewall against the far-right in Germany with the AfD.)	Union SPD	Union SPD Grüne	SPD Grüne Linke	Union SPD Linke	Union
INSA	30 Apr – 4 May 2026	2,008	26	23	–	24	–	–
INSA	13–16 Mar 2026	2,002	25	–	24	–	14	–
INSA	19–20 Feb 2026	1,003	24	22	–	20	–	–
INSA	27–30 Jun 2025	2,008	24	–	13	13	9	9
INSA	11–14 Apr 2025	2,002	26	–	19	–	15	9
INSA	4–7 Apr 2025	2,008	27	–	19	–	14	10

== Constituency projections ==
With the 2023 electoral reform fixing the number of seats to 630, constituency seats are only awarded if covered by the votes cast for the party in that state. As such, the number of constituency seats won by a party may be lower than that party's number of constituency pluralities. In the 2025 German federal election, 23 constituency winners were left out.

=== Constituency pluralities ===
Polling firm	Release date	Union	AfD	SPD	Grüne	Linke
election.de	15 Nov 2026	124	90	46	33	6
election.de	22 Oct 2026	120	96	43	34	6
election.de	15 Sep 2026	129	91	42	31	6
election.de	15 Aug 2026	146	80	42	25	6
election.de	15 Jul 2026	149	78	41	25	6
election.de	15 Jun 2026	155	76	37	25	6
election.de	15 May 2026	165	65	42	21	6
election.de	15 Apr 2026	180	52	43	18	6
election.de	15 Mar 2026	179	49	49	15	7
election.de	15 Feb 2026	176	50	51	15	7
election.de	15 Jan 2026	180	52	45	15	7
election.de	15 Dec 2025	182	52	43	15	7
election.de	15 Nov 2025	181	52	45	14	7
election.de	15 Oct 2025	183	52	43	13	8
election.de	15 Sep 2025	186	49	43	14	7
INSA	15 Sep 2025	178	61	39	13	8
INSA	8 Sep 2025	172	73	34	12	8
INSA	1 Sep 2025	172	68	39	12	8
INSA	25 Aug 2025	159	73	48	12	7
INSA	18 Aug 2025	177	61	41	12	8
election.de	15 Aug 2025	188	49	41	14	7
INSA	11 Aug 2025	197	55	29	10	8
INSA	4 Aug 2025	194	54	36	10	5
INSA	28 Jul 2025	195	51	38	9	6
INSA	21 Jul 2025	204	53	26	10	6
election.de	15 Jul 2025	197	48	36	11	7
INSA	14 Jul 2025	191	49	40	13	6
INSA	7 Jul 2025	205	50	26	13	5
INSA	30 Jun 2025	190	46	43	14	6
INSA	23 Jun 2025	186	47	47	13	6
INSA	16 Jun 2025	184	48	46	16	5
election.de	15 Jun 2025	189	49	41	13	7
INSA	10 Jun 2025	195	47	44	10	3
INSA	2 Jun 2025	182	52	52	9	4
INSA	26 May 2025	174	54	52	13	6
INSA	19 May 2025	180	55	44	15	5
election.de	15 May 2025	181	51	46	13	8
INSA	12 May 2025	160	61	60	14	4
INSA	5 May 2025	157	66	57	14	5
INSA	28 Apr 2025	158	69	51	16	5
INSA	22 Apr 2025	174	58	48	14	5
election.de	15 Apr 2025	181	50	47	14	7
INSA	14 Apr 2025	165	50	59	20	5
INSA	7 Apr 2025	160	65	56	13	5
INSA	31 Mar 2025	178	48	51	16	6
INSA	24 Mar 2025	192	52	35	12	8
INSA	17 Mar 2025	199	44	40	7	9
election.de	15 Mar 2025	192	45	43	11	8
INSA	10 Mar 2025	189	41	55	8	6
2025 federal election	23 Feb 2025	190	46	45	12	6

=== By probability ===
Polling firm	Release date	Union			AfD			SPD			Grüne			Linke		
Polling firm	Release date	Safe	Likely	Lean	Safe	Likely	Lean	Safe	Likely	Lean	Safe	Likely	Lean	Safe	Likely	Lean
election.de	22 Oct 2026	9	42	73	43	4	43	0	14	32	3	13	17	1	3	2
election.de	22 Oct 2026	7	36	77	43	7	46	0	13	30	2	14	18	1	3	2
election.de	15 Sep 2026	10	46	73	43	5	43	0	10	32	2	12	17	2	2	2
election.de	15 Aug 2026	13	64	69	42	4	34	0	10	32	1	12	12	2	2	2
election.de	15 Jul 2026	14	73	62	42	4	32	0	10	31	1	12	12	2	2	2
election.de	15 Jun 2026	17	78	60	42	4	30	0	10	27	0	13	12	1	3	2
election.de	15 May 2026	24	78	63	41	4	20	0	14	28	0	8	13	1	3	2
election.de	15 Apr 2026	32	95	53	38	6	8	0	15	28	0	6	12	2	3	1
election.de	15 Mar 2026	45	84	50	34	9	6	3	16	30	0	3	12	2	3	2
election.de	15 Feb 2026	35	89	52	37	7	6	3	15	33	0	3	12	2	3	2
election.de	15 Jan 2026	32	92	56	38	6	8	0	15	30	0	3	12	2	3	2
election.de	15 Dec 2025	34	94	54	37	7	8	0	15	28	0	3	12	2	4	1
election.de	15 Nov 2025	34	96	51	38	6	8	1	14	30	0	3	11	2	4	1
election.de	15 Oct 2025	34	97	52	38	6	8	1	14	28	0	3	10	2	4	2
election.de	15 Sep 2025	51	92	43	34	9	6	3	13	27	0	3	11	2	4	1
election.de	15 Aug 2025	58	85	45	33	10	6	1	14	26	0	3	11	2	3	2
election.de	15 Jul 2025	80	78	39	31	11	6	1	13	22	0	3	8	2	3	2
election.de	15 Jun 2025	57	87	45	33	10	6	2	14	25	0	3	10	2	4	1
election.de	15 May 2025	38	95	48	35	9	7	2	13	31	0	3	10	2	4	2
election.de	15 Apr 2025	41	93	47	35	9	6	3	13	31	0	3	11	2	4	1
election.de	15 Mar 2025	82	75	35	31	11	3	3	12	28	0	2	9	2	4	2
2025 federal election	23 Feb 2025	190			46			45			12			6		

=== Second place ===
Polling firm	Release date	SPD	Union	AfD	Grüne	Linke
election.de	15 Nov 2026	57	80	138	15	9
election.de	22 Oct 2026	56	80	139	14	10
election.de	15 Sep 2026	48	81	145	14	11
election.de	15 Aug 2026	40	84	148	18	9
election.de	15 Jul 2026	39	88	147	18	7
election.de	15 Jun 2026	41	85	148	19	6
election.de	15 May 2026	57	79	139	19	5
election.de	15 Apr 2026	69	77	128	20	5
election.de	15 Mar 2026	83	81	111	20	4
election.de	15 Feb 2026	76	82	117	20	4
election.de	15 Jan 2026	67	77	131	20	4
election.de	15 Dec 2025	70	77	129	19	4
election.de	15 Nov 2025	70	77	128	20	4
election.de	15 Oct 2025	71	75	129	21	3
election.de	15 Sep 2025	79	78	117	21	4
election.de	15 Aug 2025	80	80	114	21	4
election.de	15 Jul 2025	89	78	104	24	4
election.de	15 Jun 2025	81	79	113	22	4
election.de	15 May 2025	72	81	122	21	3
election.de	15 Apr 2025	75	82	117	21	4
election.de	15 Mar 2025	94	82	96	24	3
2025 federal election	23 Feb 2025	111	82	79	22	5
