= Kocijan =

Kocijan is a Croatian surname. Notable people with the surname include:

- Mateo Kocijan (born 1995), Croatian footballer
- Tomica Kocijan (born 1967), Croatian-Austrian footballer

== See also ==
- Kocian, a Czech and Slovak surname
- Kocijani, a settlement in Croatia
