= Kocjan, Radenci =

Kocjan
- Location in Slovenia
- Coordinates: 46°36′8.15″N 16°2′1.3″E
- Country: Slovenia
- Traditional region: Styria
- Statistical region: Mura
- Municipality: Radenci

Area
  - Total: 0.43 km^{2} (0.17 sq mi)
- Elevation: 253.1 m (830 ft)

Population (2002)
  - Total: 40

Kocjan (pronounced [ˈkoːtsjan]) is a small settlement in the Municipality of Radenci in northeastern Slovenia.
