= Piotr Lachert =

Polish composer (1938–2018)

- Born: 5 September 1938; Warsaw, Poland
- Died: 18 September 2018 (aged 80)
- Occupations: Composer, pianist, teacher
- Years active: 1960s–2010s
- Employer(s): Conservatoire of Brussels; Warsaw Music School; Academy of Music in Pescara
- Known for: Founder of the new consonant music movement
- Notable work: Aroma Tre * Concerto africain * Alexandra Park (pedagogical works)

Piotr Lachert (5 September 1938 – 18 September 2018) was a Polish composer, pianist and teacher.

Lachert lived and worked in Warsaw, Paris, Hannover, Brussels and in Pescara (Italy) and was a piano teacher in a conservatoire in Brussels, the Warsaw Music School and the Pescaran Academy of Music. Lachert directed numerous university masterclasses.

Originally a concert pianist, Lachert gained international recognition as a composer. He is regarded as one of the founders of the new consonant music movement. In 1973, he founded TEMV! (Théâtre européen de musique vivante!) in Brussels, which he directed for twenty years and which had a significant influence on the direction of his catalogue.

Lachert composed more than 200 works including concertos, sonatas, chamber music, works for the musical theatre and didactic music. His compositions include a ballet (Aroma Tre), and numerous volumes of piano pedagogy. His music has been published by Bärenreiter, Jobert, Alain Van Kerckhoven Éditeur, and Chiola Music Press.

== Selected works ==
Many works by Piotr Lachert are published by Alain Van Kerckhoven Editeur, CeBeDeM and Consonant Music Press.

Opera

- Erotic music, scène 24 (1977)
- Primavera (1992)

Musical theatre

- Mysli pospolite (1972)
- Pièce pour une brique, violon et piano (1972)
- Sérénade (1975)
- Sinfonietta (1975)
- Dés (1976)
- Hammerkantate (1977)
- Pasjans. dés (1978)
- Le franc belge est solide (1983)
- Aroka Tre (1984)
- Amore mio, czyli Acsamit Quamtza (1988)

Orchestral

- S comme Makyo (1980)
- Tu i tam (Ktos) (1991)
- Sinfonia Scolastica (1993)
- La figlia di Jorio (1997)
- Hey colenda, colenda for string orchestra (1999)
- In omaggio (1999)

Concertante

- Concerto africain for piano or clavichord or harpsichord and string orchestra (1978)
- Musique for piano 4 hands and orchestra (1981)
- Concerto No.2 for violin and orchestra (1987)
- Concerto No.2 for piano and orchestra (1988)
- Concerto No.3 for piano and orchestra (1991)
- Un Albanese in Italia for cello and string orchestra

Chamber music

- Prélude et Fugue for oboe solo (1970)
- Six Sketches for violin and piano (1970)
- Miniatury fletowe (Flute Miniatures) for flute and piano (1971)
- Anti-contrastes for violin, clarinet and piano (1973)
- Habent Panem Paratum for flute, or oboe or clarinet solo (1978)
- Puzzle 1 for tuba solo (1978)
- Puzzle 2 for double bass solo (1979)
- K comme Makyo for clarinet, trombone, cello and piano (1980)
- Pha for brass quintet (1980)
- Bajka for violin and cello (1981)
- Per Adele for violin and piano (1982)
- Per Anca for violin and piano (1982)
- Tocatanca for clarinet solo (1982)
- Adenja for string quartet (1984)
- Body Violence for English horn solo (1984)
- Szuja szott for flute and piano (1985)
- Katanick for viola and harpsichord (1986)
- Te ne ricordi? for cello solo (1988)
- Vino, vino for 2 violins (1989)
- Nuits bergamasques for violin, cello and piano (1990)
- Sonata No.4 for viola and piano (1991)
- Sonata No.5 for clarinet or alto saxophone and piano (1991)
- 21 for string quartet (1992)
- Kuba Trio for flute, cello and piano (1992)
- Akabis for flute and marimba (or keyboard) (1993)
- Étude de concert for flute solo (1993)
- Padova, Padova for flute, clarinet, horn, guitar and piano (1993)
- Sonata No.9 for violin solo (1993)
- Giraffa sentimentale for 2 flutes and piano (1996)
- Sonata No.16 for flute and piano (1997)
- Sonata No.17 for violin and piano (1997)
- String Quartet No.3 (1997)
- Talentina for flute and piano (1997)
- Preghiera per una buona morte for violin, clarinet, cello and piano (1998)
- Pienia anielskie e Tango satanico, Octet for 2 oboes, 2 clarinets, 2 bassoons and 2 horns (1999)

Organ

- Modlitwa (1971)
- Pièce pour orgue (1972)
- Bandalaluc for 2 organs (1975)

Piano

- Zart (1970)
- Études improvisantes (1973)
- Études intelligentes (1974)
- Prima vista (1975)
- Poussières des étoiles (1980)
- Dix pièces (10 Pieces) for 2 pianos (1981)
- Per Adele for piano 4 hands (1982)
- Per ragazzi (1983)
- Aroma in B (1984)
- Aroma in F (1984)
- Bi Ba Bo (1984)
- Live Computer Story (1984)
- Inventions (1985)
- Kauffolie for 36 pianos (1986)
- Sonata No.2 (1988)
- Amalo mio for piano 4 hands (1991)
- Ariki in F (1991)
- Avale Koan (1991)
- Sonata No.3 (1991)
- Sonata No.6 "Pescarese" (1992)
- Sonata No.7 "Fiamminga" (1992)
- Sonata No.8 (1993)
- Sonata No.10 (1994)
- Sonata No.11 (1994)
- Per Cristina (1995)
- Sonata No.12 "Sweet" (1995)
- Sonata No.13 (1995)
- Sonata No.15 (1996)
- 5 gatti di Laura (1997)
- Sonata No.18 (1997)
- Trois photos de Betty Bee (1997)
- Sonata No.19 for piano 4 hands (1999)
- Sonata No.20 "Sto lat" ("One Hundred Years") (1998)
- Sonata No.21 (2000)
- Sonata No.22 (2000)
- Per Claudia (2001)
- Sonata No.24 (2002)
- Tasti e testi

Vocal

- Hit for soprano, mezzo-soprano, tenor, alto tenor and bass (1980)
- Zes Isa liederen for soprano and piano (1985)
- Cantiques for female voice and piano (1987)
- Delikatnie for soprano and piano (1987)
- Cinq traductions for 2 voices and typewriter (1989)
- Tango macabre for 2 sopranos, tenor and chamber orchestra (1991)
- Jasne slonko for soprano and piano (1994)
- Sorella for voice and piano (1994)
