= Tom Kotzian =

German politician

Member of the Landtag of Rhineland-Palatinate
- Incumbent
- Assumed office 18 May 2026

Personal details
- Born: 1990 or 1991 (age 35–36)
- Party: Alternative for Germany

Tom Kotzian is a German politician who was elected member of the Landtag of Rhineland-Palatinate in 2026. He is a district councillor of Kaiserslautern and a Verbandsgemeinde councillor of Otterbach-Otterberg.
