= Municipality of Radenci =

Municipality of Slovenia

Municipality of Radenci Občina Radenci
- Municipality
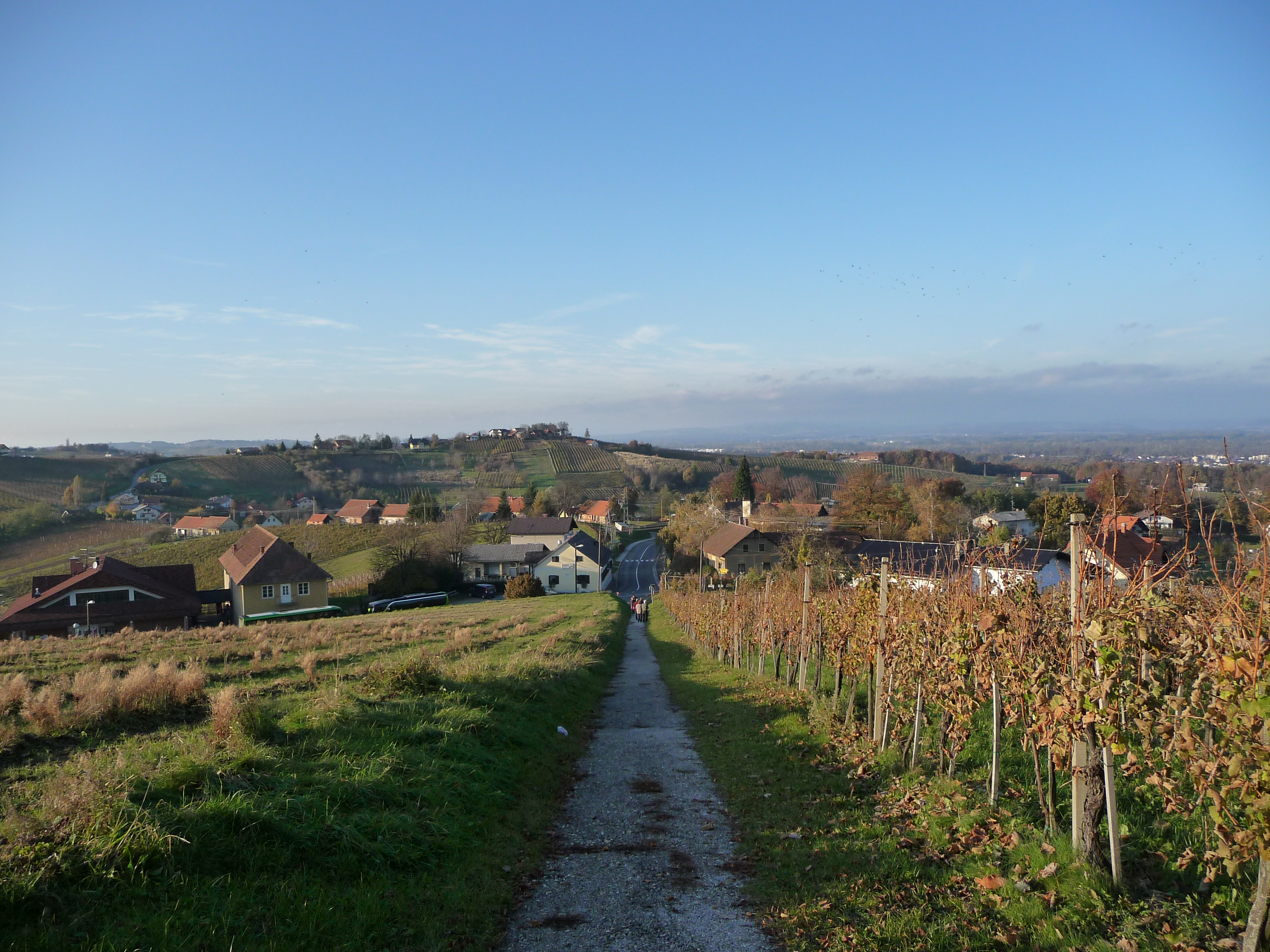

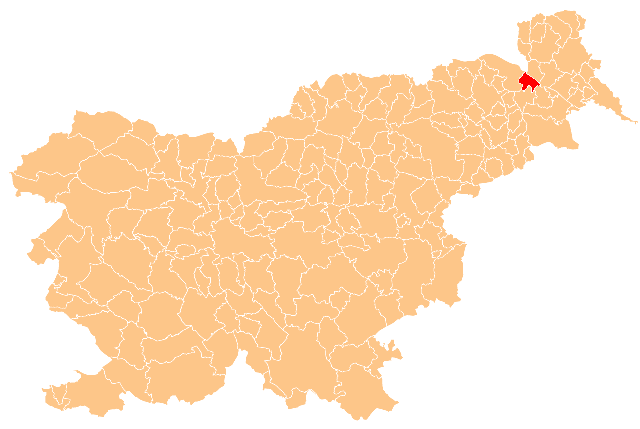
- Location of the Municipality of Radenci in Slovenia
- Coordinates: 46°39′N 16°03′E
- Country: Slovenia

Government
  - Mayor: Janez Rihtarič

Area
  - Total: 34.1 km^{2} (13.2 sq mi)

Population (2002)
  - Total: 5,265
  - Density: 154/km^{2} (400/sq mi)
- Time zone: UTC+01 (CET)
  - Summer (DST): UTC+02 (CEST)
- Website: www.radenci.si

The Municipality of Radenci (pronounced [ˈɾaːdɛntsi]; Slovene: Občina Radenci) is a municipality in northern Slovenia. It gets its name from the largest settlement and administrative seat of the municipality, Radenci. It borders Austria.

== Settlements ==
In addition to the municipal seat of Radenci, the municipality also includes the following settlements:

- Boračeva
- Hrašenski Vrh
- Hrastje–Mota
- Janžev Vrh
- Kapelski Vrh
- Kobilščak
- Kocjan
- Melanjski Vrh
- Murski Vrh
- Murščak
- Okoslavci
- Paričjak
- Rački Vrh
- Radenski Vrh
- Rihtarovci
- Spodnji Kocjan
- Šratovci
- Turjanci
- Turjanski Vrh
- Zgornji Kocjan
- Žrnova
