= Boračeva =

- Location in Slovenia
- Coordinates: 46°38′31.65″N 16°1′40.99″E
- Country: Slovenia
- Traditional region: Styria
- Statistical region: Mura
- Municipality: Radenci

Area
  - Total: 2.62 km^{2} (1.01 sq mi)
- Elevation: 209 m (686 ft)

Population (2002)
  - Total: 391

Boračeva (pronounced [bɔˈɾaːtʃɛʋa], in older sources also Boračova, German: Woritschau) is a village in the Municipality of Radenci in northeastern Slovenia.

There is a small chapel-shrine in the centre of the settlement. It was built in 1874.
