= Žabnica, Kranj =

Žabnica
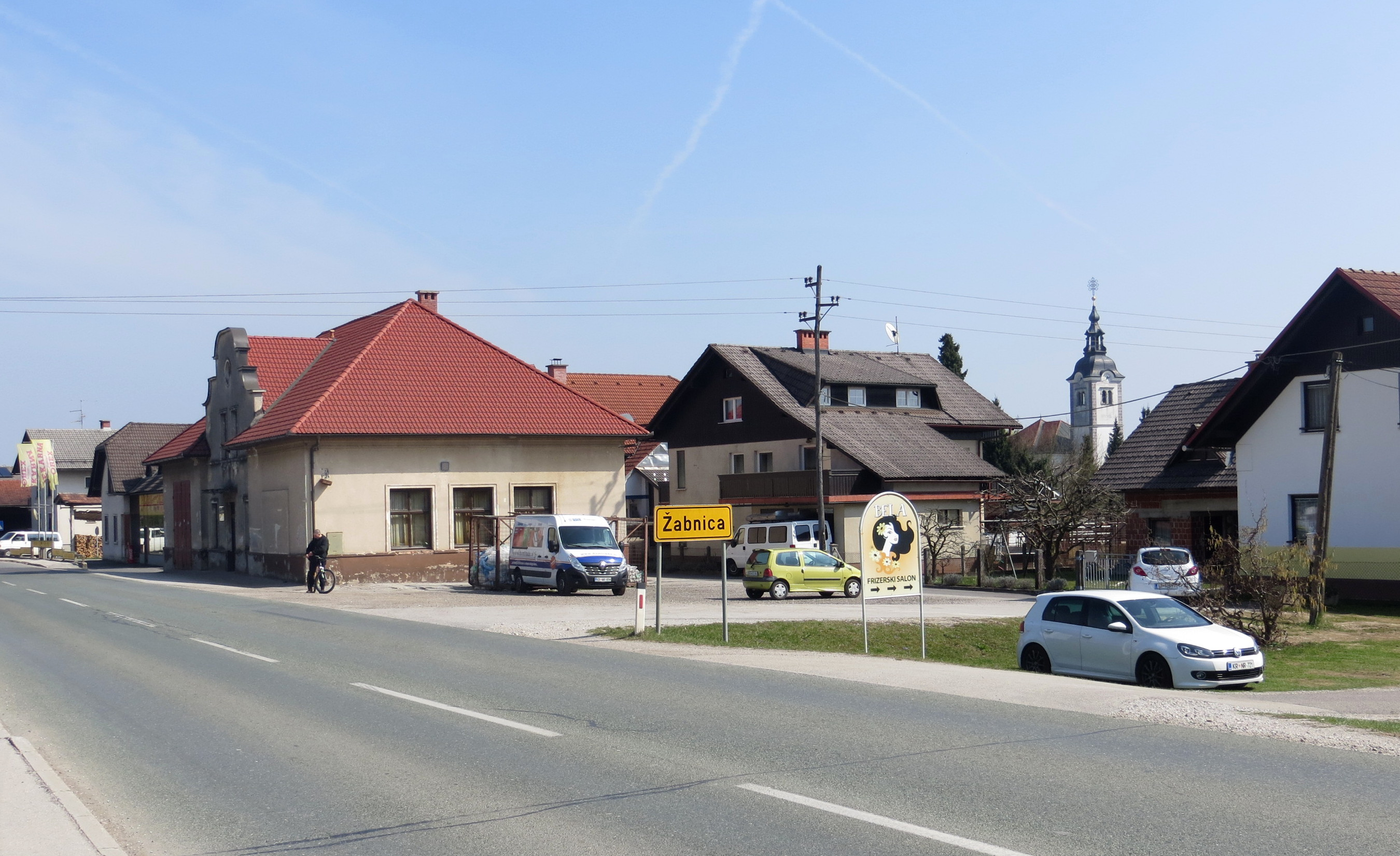

- Location in Slovenia
- Coordinates: 46°11′39.49″N 14°20′0.72″E
- Country: Slovenia
- Traditional region: Upper Carniola
- Statistical region: Upper Carniola
- Municipality: Kranj

Area
  - Total: 4.08 km^{2} (1.58 sq mi)
- Elevation: 369.9 m (1,214 ft)

Population (2002)
  - Total: 323

Žabnica (pronounced [ˈʒaːbnitsa]; German: Safnitz) is a village south of Kranj in the Upper Carniola region of Slovenia.

== Church ==
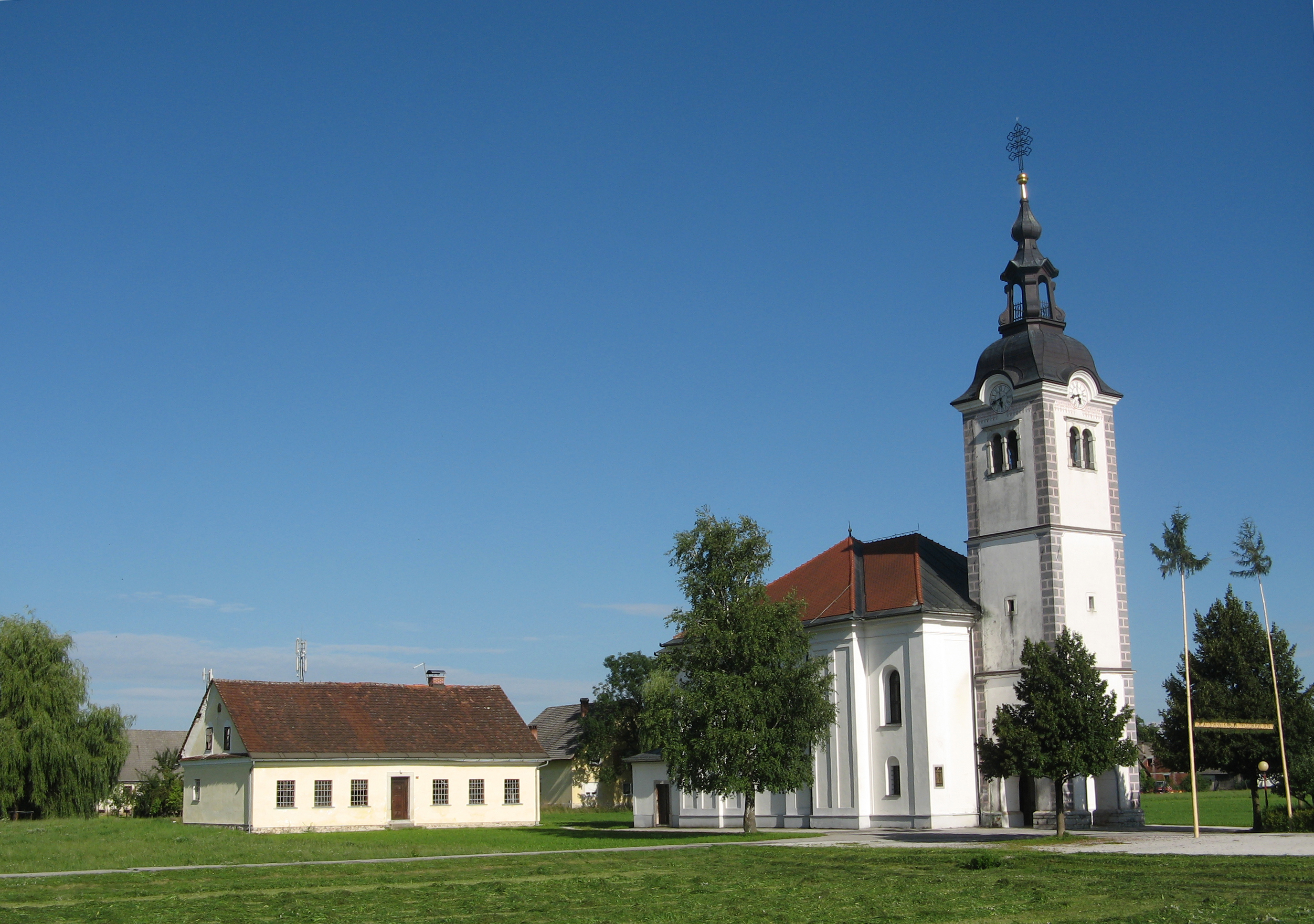
Saint Ulrich's Church

The parish church in the village is dedicated to Saint Ulrich and belongs to the Archdiocese of Ljubljana.
