= Wojciech Kocyan =

Polish pianist

- Education: University of Southern California (DMA)
- Occupations: Pianist; music educator
- Years active: 2000s–2010s
- Employer: Loyola Marymount University
- Style: Classical

Wojciech Kocyan is a Polish pianist and music educator. He is most well known for his performances of Chopin, and for his 2001 album, which was named as one of the 50 best classical recordings ever made by gramophone, in 2007. Kocyan earned a master's degree with John Perry at the University of Southern California, where he also received his doctor of musical arts. In addition to being a laureate to several international piano competitions, Kocyan is currently an artist-in-residence at Loyola Marymount University in Los Angeles, California.

== Discography ==
- 2001: Skriabin, Prokofiew, Rachmaninow (Dux 0389)
- 2003: Hommage à Carlos Guastavino (Dux 0313) – with Jan Jakub Bokun
- 2005: Reflets dans Chopin: Wojciech Kocyan Plays Liszt, Mompou, Schumann, Saya (Dux 0487)
- 2013: Wojciech Kocyan plays Robert Schumann (Dux 0734)
