= Žabja Vas =

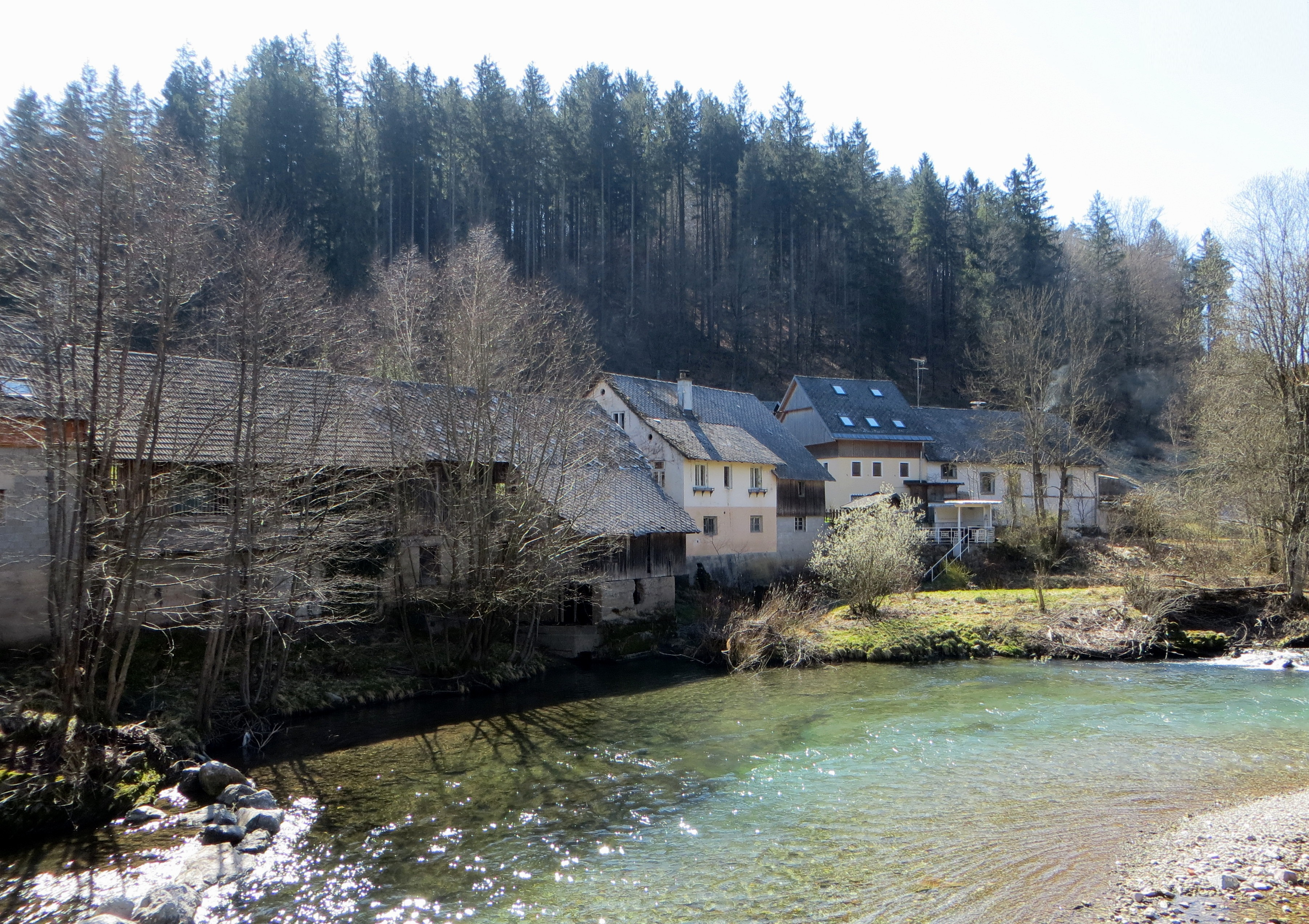

- Location in Slovenia
- Coordinates: 46°6′37.49″N 14°9′50.08″E
- Country: Slovenia
- Traditional region: Upper Carniola
- Statistical region: Upper Carniola
- Municipality: Gorenja Vas–Poljane

Area
  - Total: 1.51 km^{2} (0.58 sq mi)
- Elevation: 412.4 m (1,353 ft)

Population (2002)
  - Total: 37

Žabja Vas (pronounced [ˈʒaːbja ˈʋaːs]; Slovene: Žabja vas) is a settlement on the right bank of the Poljane Sora River halfway between Poljane and Gorenja Vas in the Municipality of Gorenja Vas–Poljane in the Upper Carniola region of Slovenia.
