= Kapelski Vrh, Slovenia =

Kapelski Vrh
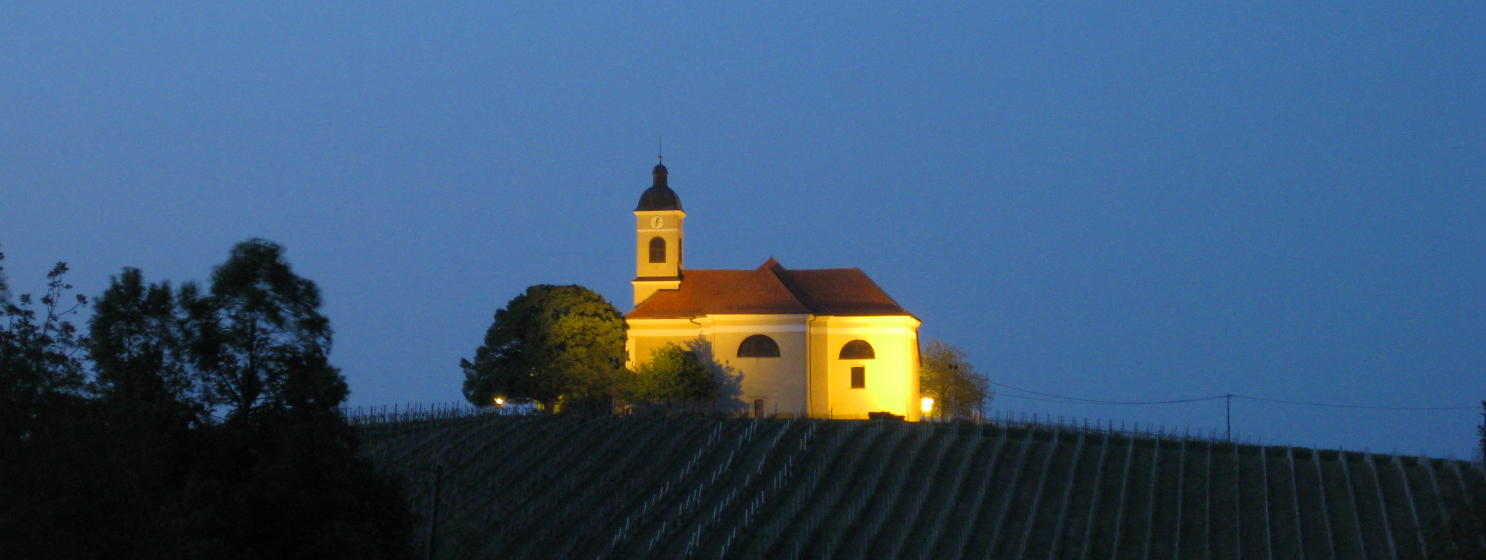

- Location in Slovenia
- Coordinates: 46°36′58.41″N 16°1′54.73″E
- Country: Slovenia
- Traditional region: Styria
- Statistical region: Mura
- Municipality: Radenci

Area
  - Total: 1.97 km^{2} (0.76 sq mi)
- Elevation: 280.2 m (919 ft)

Population (2002)
  - Total: 226

Kapelski Vrh (pronounced [ˈkaːpɛlski ˈʋəɾx]) is a settlement in the Municipality of Radenci in northeastern Slovenia.

The local parish church is dedicated to Mary Magdalene. It is built on a hill surrounded with vineyards above the settlement and is a popular spot with day-trippers. It was built between 1823 and 1824.
