= Hrastje–Mota =

- Location in Slovenia
- Coordinates: 46°36′48.73″N 16°4′46.58″E
- Country: Slovenia
- Traditional region: Styria
- Statistical region: Mura
- Municipality: Radenci

Area
  - Total: 7.77 km^{2} (3.00 sq mi)
- Elevation: 196.1 m (643 ft)

Population (2002)
  - Total: 386

Hrastje–Mota (pronounced [ˈxɾaːstjɛ ˈmoːta]; Slovene: Hrastje - Mota) is a settlement in the Municipality of Radenci in northeastern Slovenia. As its compound name indicates, it is made up of two settlements: the hamlets of Hrastje and Mota, both lying on the right bank of the Mura River.

== History ==
The settlement of Hrastje–Mota was created in 1953, when the formerly separate villages of Hrastje and Mota were merged into a single settlement.

== Cultural heritage ==
There is a small chapel in the center of Hrastje and a chapel-shrine in the centre of Mota. The chapel in Hrastje was built in 1900 in the neo-Gothic style and was used as a small classroom for religious education. The shrine in Mota was built in the early 20th century and was moved to the south of the main village crossroads when the roads were widened.

== Notable people ==
Jakob Missia (1838–1902), the Bishop of Ljubljana, the Archbishop of Gorizia and the first cardinal of Slovene descent, was born in Mota. His birth house bears a memorial plaque from 1934 and has been protected as a cultural monument of local significance.
