= Janeži =

- Location in Slovenia
- Coordinates: 45°45′24.42″N 14°35′34.38″E
- Country: Slovenia
- Traditional region: Lower Carniola
- Statistical region: Southeast Slovenia
- Municipality: Sodražica

Area
  - Total: 0.18 km^{2} (0.069 sq mi)
- Elevation: 814.4 m (2,672 ft)

Population (2002)
  - Total: 18
- Postal code: 1317

Janeži (pronounced [ˈjaːnɛʒi]) is a small settlement in the hills west of Sodražica in southern Slovenia. The area is part of the traditional region of Lower Carniola and is now included in the Southeast Slovenia Statistical Region.

Together with the villages of Betonovo, Kračali, Petrinci, and Kržeti it comprises the community and Parish of Gora nad Sodražico, also known as Gora.

There is a small chapel in the village dedicated to Our Lady of the Snows. It was built in the first quarter of the 20th century.

== Notable people ==
- Magdalena Gornik (1835–1896), mystic
