= Kračali =

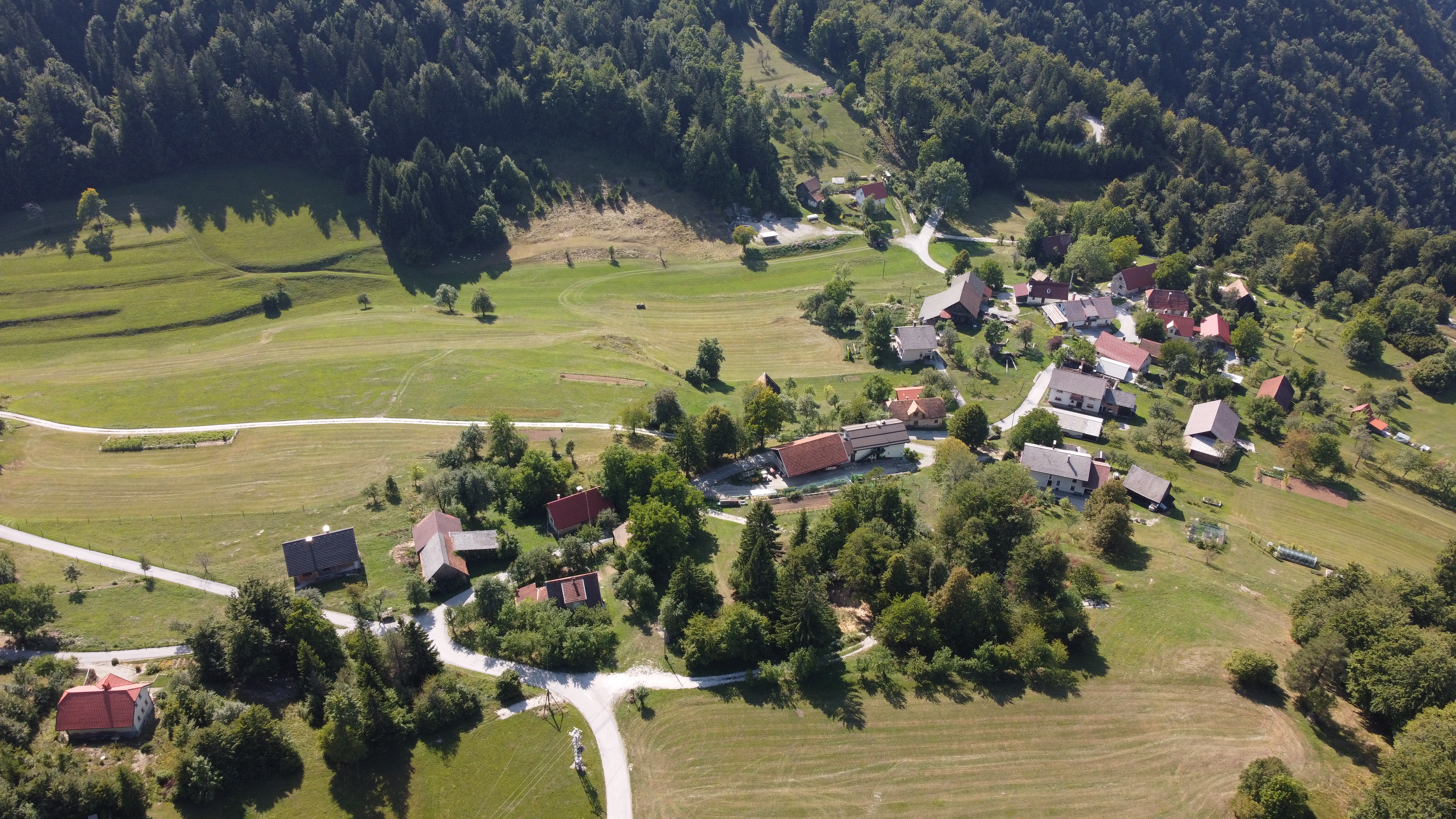

- Location in Slovenia
- Coordinates: 45°45′19.73″N 14°34′50.45″E
- Country: Slovenia
- Traditional region: Lower Carniola
- Statistical region: Southeast Slovenia
- Municipality: Sodražica

Area
  - Total: 0.69 km^{2} (0.27 sq mi)
- Elevation: 804.3 m (2,639 ft)

Population (2002)
  - Total: 39
- Postal code: 1317

Kračali (pronounced [kɾaˈtʃaːli]) is a settlement in the hills west of Sodražica in southern Slovenia. It is included in the Southeast Slovenia Statistical Region. Traditionally the area around Sodražica was part of Lower Carniola. Together with the villages of Betonovo, Janeži, Petrinci, and Kržeti it comprises the community and Parish of Gora nad Sodražico, also known as Gora.

== Mass graves ==
Kračali is the site of two known mass graves or clandestine graves associated with the Second World War. The Kračali 1 Grave (Slovene: Grobišče Kračali 1), also known as the Pasture 1 Grave (Grobišče Planina 1), is located north of the road west of the village. It contains the remains of undetermined victims. The Kračali 2 Grave (Grobišče Kračali 2), also known as the Pasture 2 Grave (Grobišče Planina 2), is located south of the first grave. It contained the remains of an unknown person buried under a tree stump and has probably been exhumed.
