= Betonovo =

- Location in Slovenia
- Coordinates: 45°45′5.71″N 14°34′26.95″E
- Country: Slovenia
- Traditional region: Lower Carniola
- Statistical region: Southeast Slovenia
- Municipality: Sodražica

Area
  - Total: 1.83 km^{2} (0.71 sq mi)
- Elevation: 868.9 m (2,851 ft)

Population (2002)
  - Total: 6
- Postal code: 1317

Betonovo (pronounced [bɛˈtoːnɔʋɔ]) is a settlement in the hills west of Sodražica in southern Slovenia. Its relative remoteness has led to a decline in population with only six permanent residents remaining in 2002. The area is part of the traditional region of Lower Carniola and is now included in the Southeast Slovenia Statistical Region.

== Geography ==
Betonovo is a clustered village on a small level hilltop. The soil is shallow, and there are sinkholes in the area. Podjazbina Cave lies east of the village. Betonovo is largely surrounded by forest, which extends to neighboring Kračali. Together with the villages of Kračali, Janeži, Petrinci, and Kržeti, it comprises the community and Parish of Gora nad Sodražico, also known as Gora.

== Clandestine grave ==
Betonovo is the site of a clandestine grave from the Second World War. The Betonovo Grave (Grob Betonovo) is located south of the road west of neighboring Kračali. The grave contained the remains of a Home Guard pilot, and it was probably exhumed during road construction.
