= Magdalena Gornik =

Slovenian mystic (1835–1896)

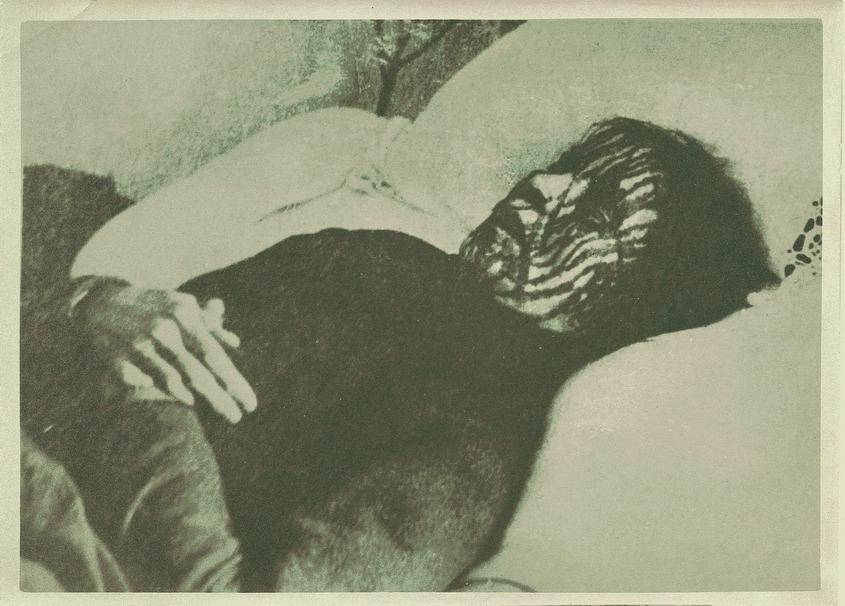
- Frančišek Lampe: Magdalena Gornik in the Extasy

Personal life
- Born: July 19, 1835 Janeži, Austrian Empire
- Died: February 23, 1896 (aged 60) Petrinci, Austria-Hungary
- Era: 19th Century
- Region: Europe
- Main interest: Christian mysticism
- Notable idea: Victim Soul
- Occupation: Theologian

Religious life
- Religion: Roman Catholic

Magdalena Gornik (also Gornikova Lenčka, Šmetova Alenčica or Alenka; July 19, 1835, Janeži, Austrian Empire – February 23, 1896, Petrinci, Austria-Hungary) was a Slovenian Roman Catholic mystic and stigmatist.

== Biography ==
=== Youth ===
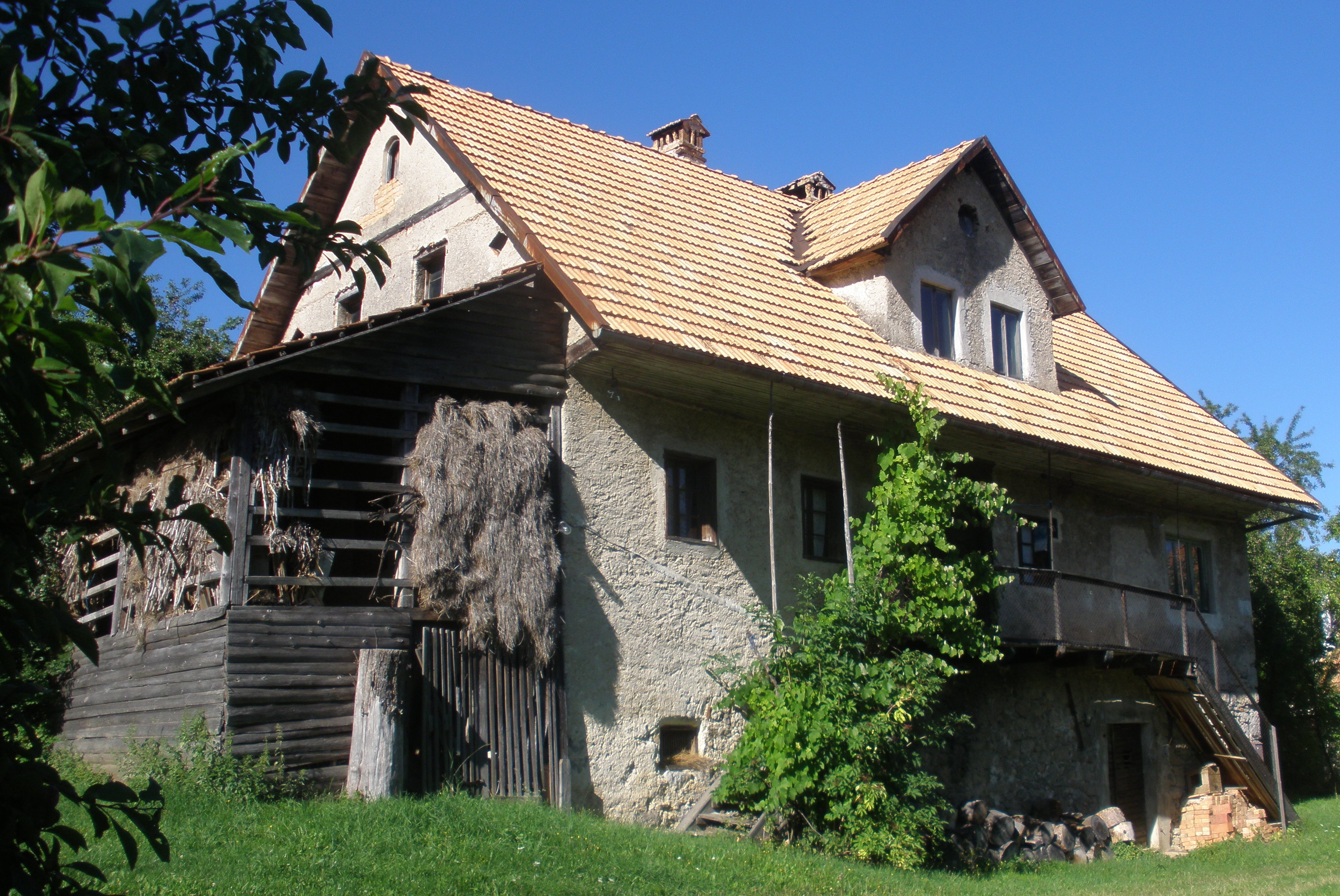
The house at the same site in Janeži where Gornik was born on July 19, 1835

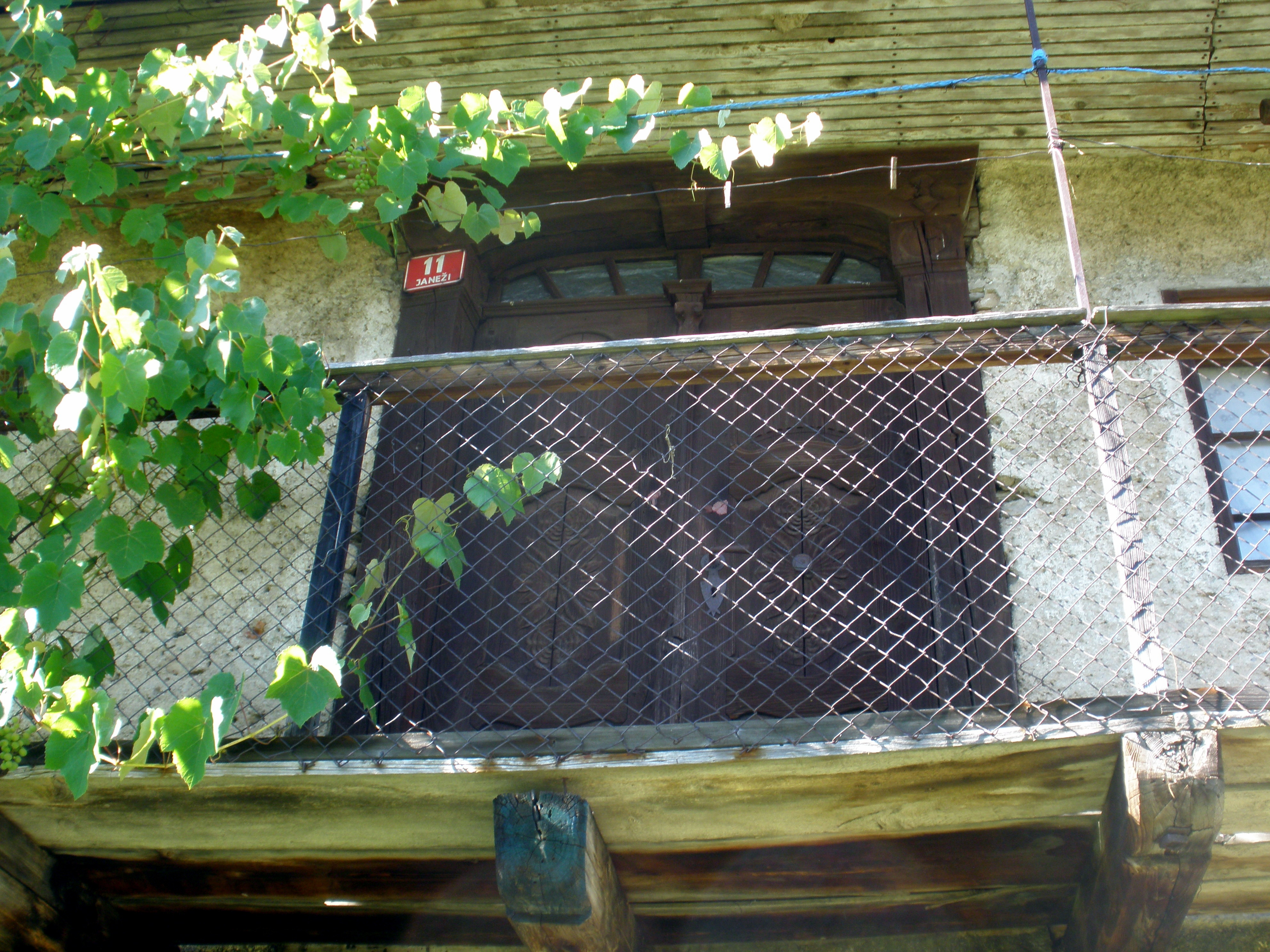
Today, the Gornik (Šmet) house is number 11

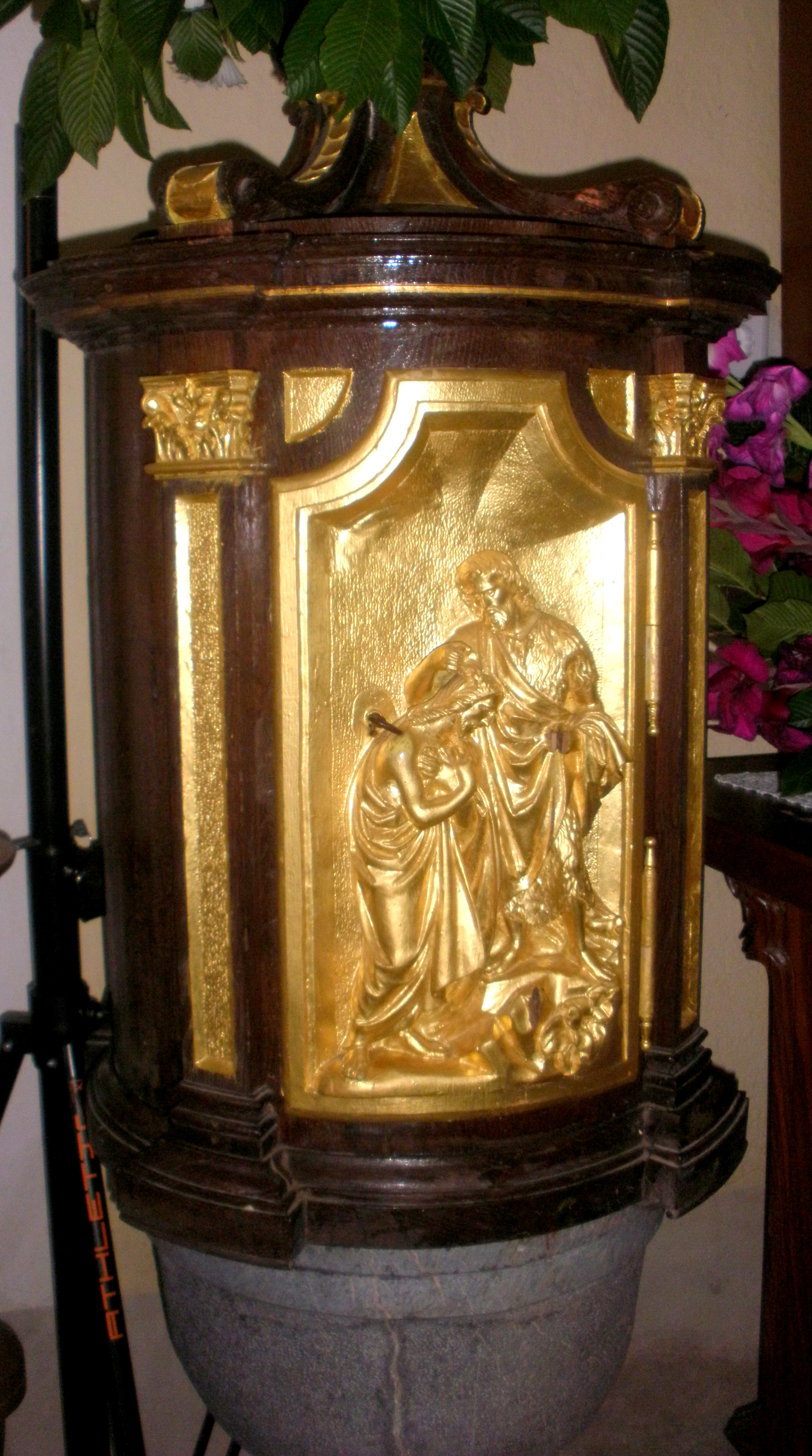
At this baptistery she was baptized on the day of her birth, with the name Maria Magdalena

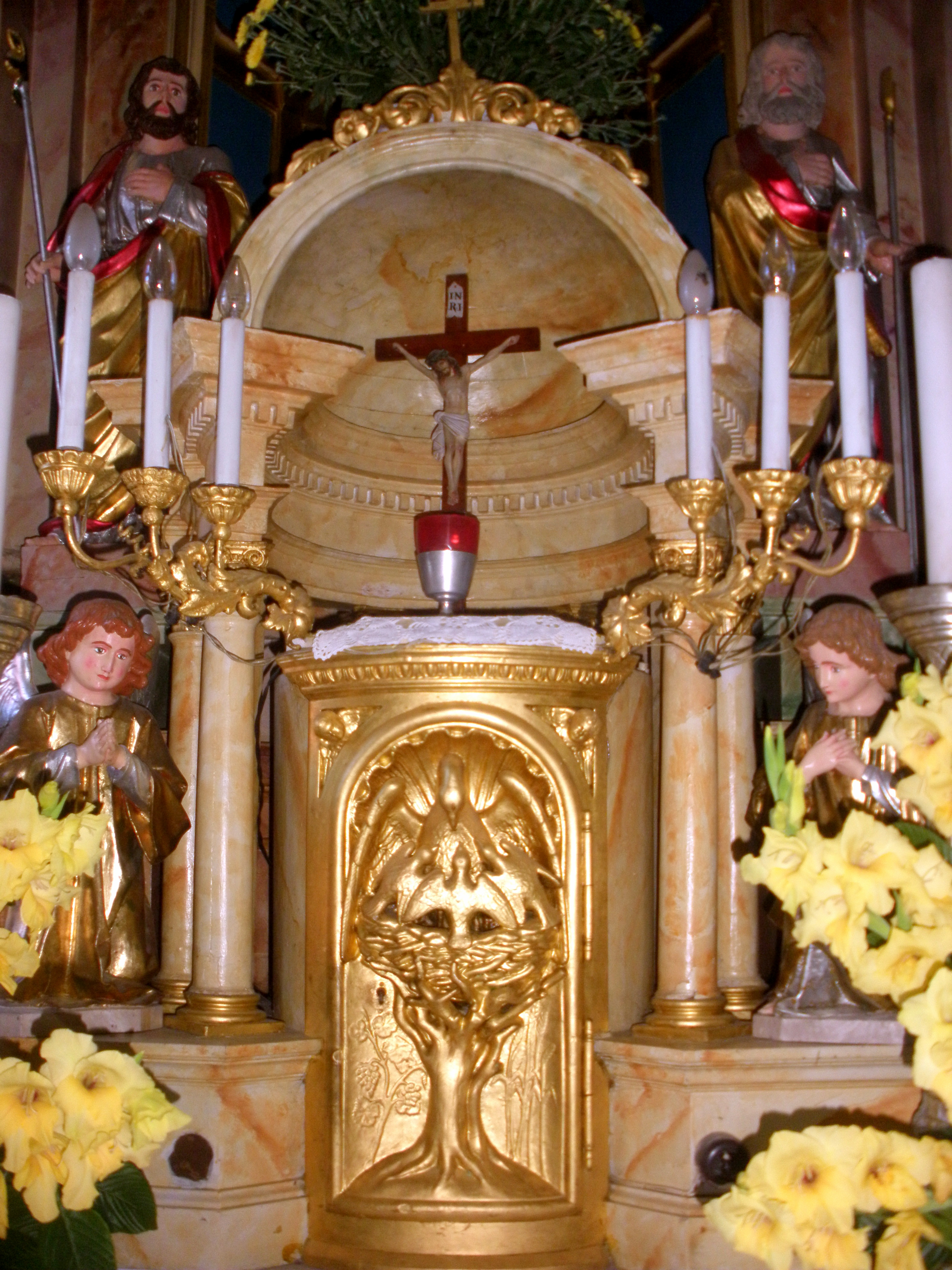
Here in 1847 Magdalene received her first Holy Communion and heard the mysterious voice

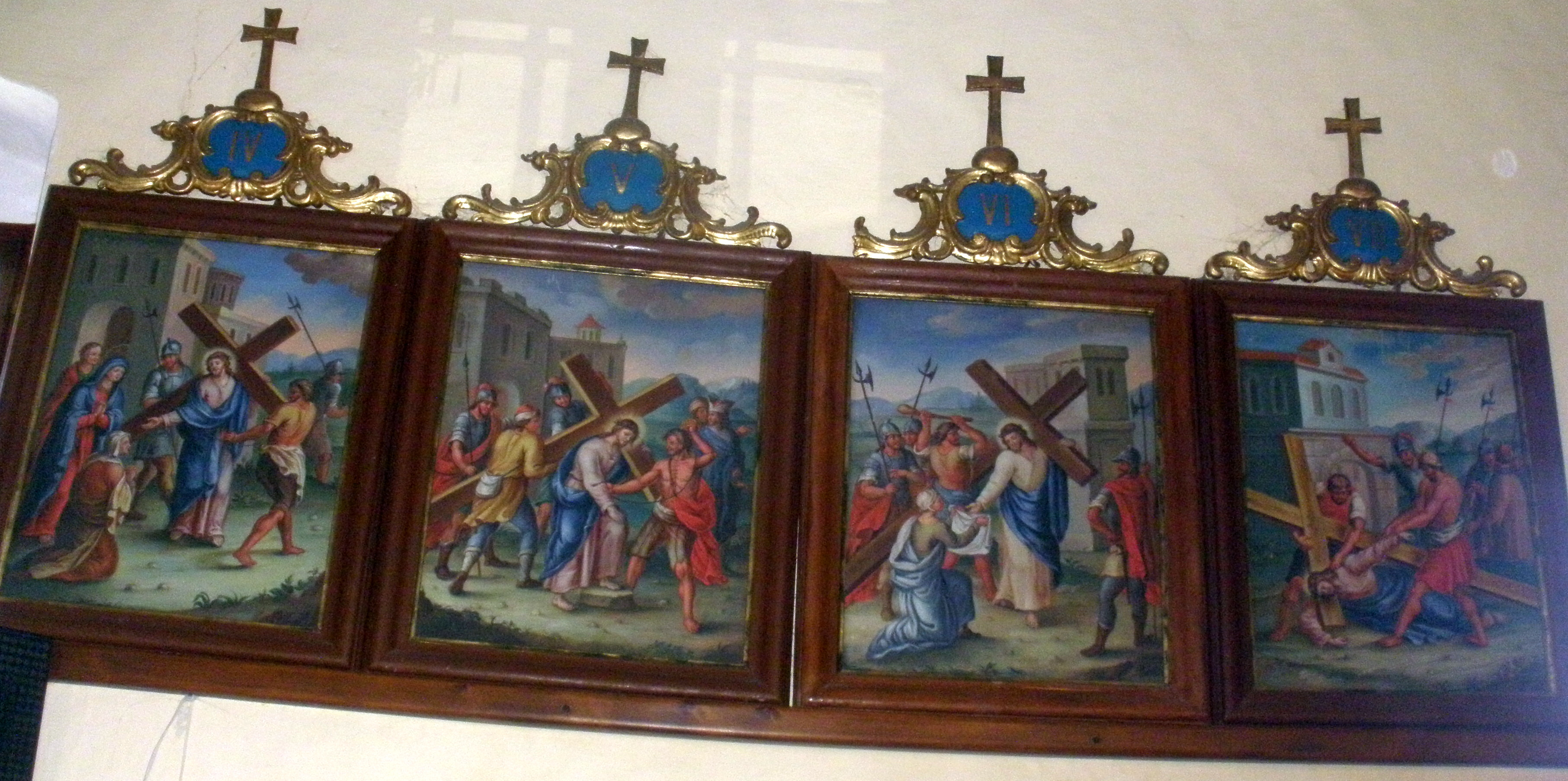
Karel Goetzl (1816–1892) from Kranj painted this Stations of the Cross at Gora in 1856

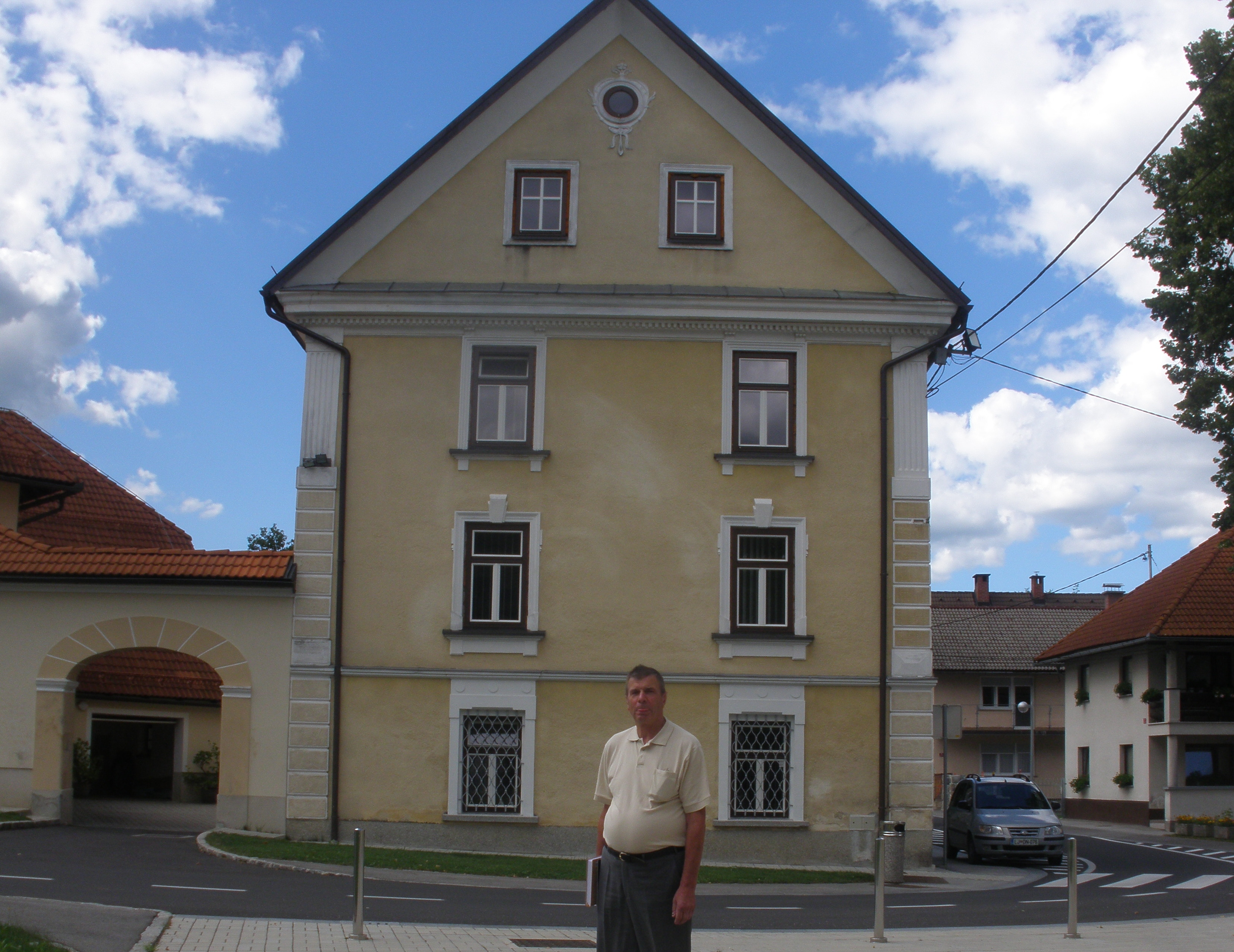
In this "farovž" (parochial house) in Sodražica, the priest Jožef Lesjak scientifically investigated the Magdalene's visions and ectasies

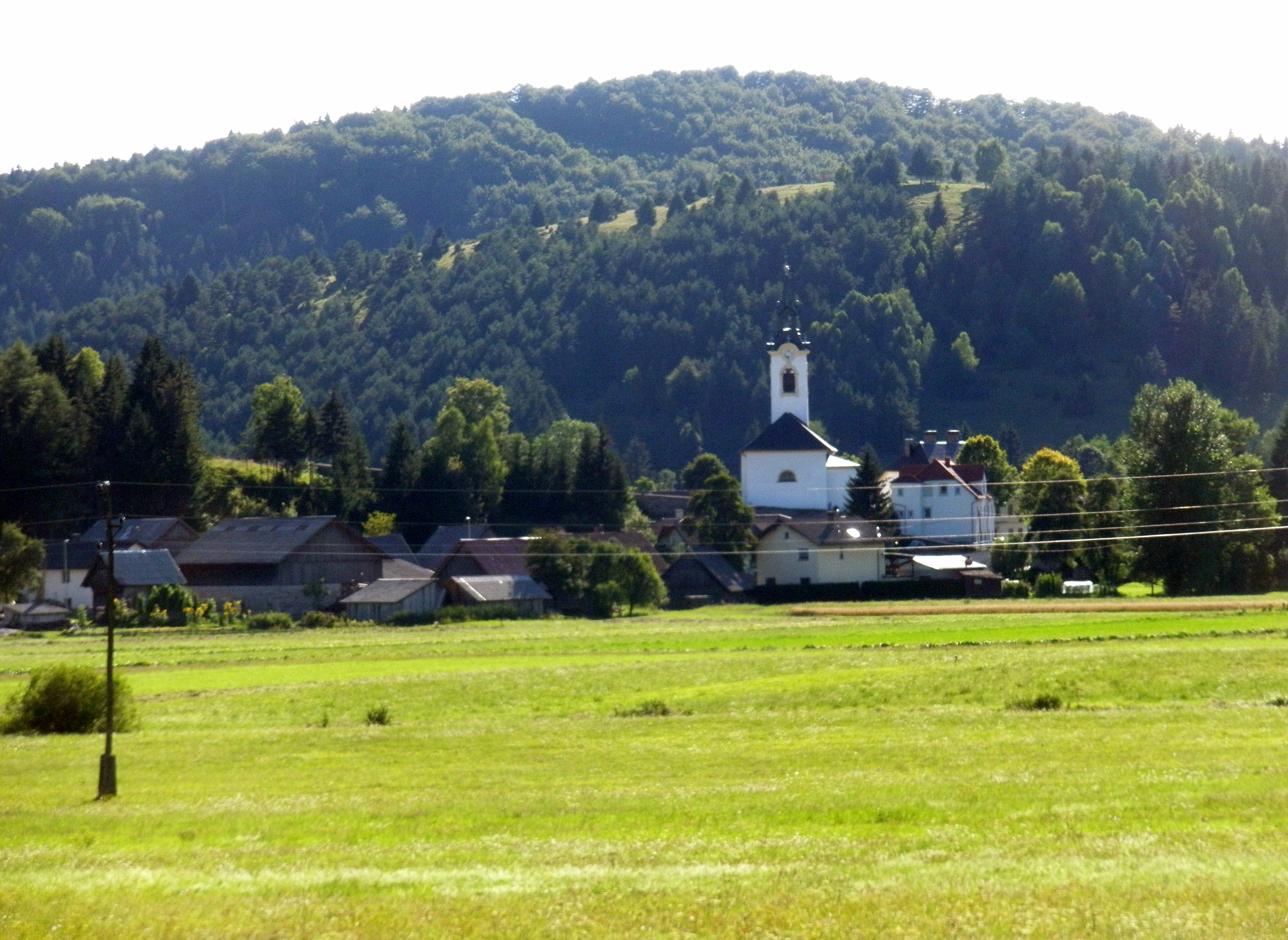
In Bloke, the priest Janez Kaplanek provided Magdalene with a safe place to live for several decades.

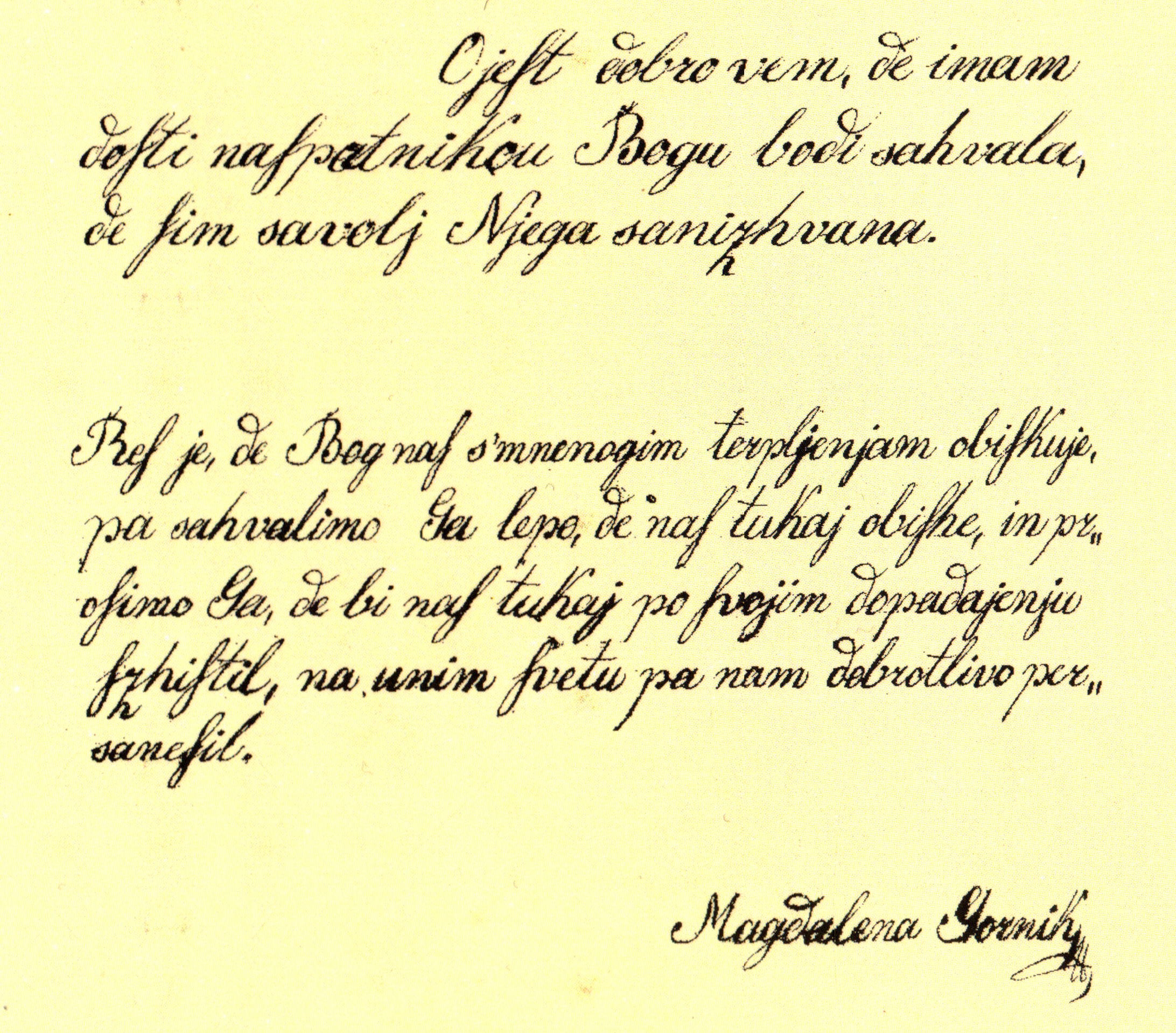
Magdalena's handwritten letter with admirable calligraphy from June 14, 1851

Gora near Sodražica rises above the Ribnica valley at an altitude of 885 meters, right on the border between Lower Carniola and Inner Carniola. The family of Gornik have always been poorer than rich. Despite their poverty, they tried to properly maintain their spiritual shepherd and the Church of Our Lady of Snows, which rises on a hill above the village of Petrinci. The church is surrounded by a cemetery where Magdalena Gornik is buried.

Below the village of Petrinci, about a quarter of an hour's walk from the church, lies the village of Janeži, which had only 13 inhabitants in 2016. There, around 1828, at the Šmet farm (the house name where the Gorniks lives), the young Jožef Gornik married Ana from nearby Petrinci, who also had the surname Gornik. They had seven children:

1. Ana (born 1829)
2. Marija (born 1831)
3. Magdalena (born 1835)
4. Alojz — the owner of the farm after her father's death — was born soon after her.
5. Agnes (born 1840)
6. Apolonija (born 1843)
7. Terezija (born 1847); died of tuberculosis at age 13.

Magdalena was born on July 19, 1835 in the family house, at Janeži 4, today number 11. This house burned down and in 1881 Magdalena's brother Alojz built a new one on the same spot. The year above the doorframe also testifies to this. On the same day, she was taken to the parish church of Mary the Snows to be baptized, with Michael Levshtek and Margareth Koshir from Petrinci serving as her godparents. She was baptized by the curate at Parish of Gora, Matthäus Ravnikar. She was given the name Maria Magdalena. Magdalena was also called Lenka, Alenčka or Lenčka, but she always signed herself as Magdalena.

Magdalena's parents were considered honest and good people. They were devout Christians and raised their children in a Christian spirit. Her mother was especially fond of Magdalena because she obeyed her at the first word, was a great help to her in the household, as well as in other farm chores. Magdalena was a lively and bright girl with blue eyes and a weak build, but with a simple and gentle nature. She loved to socialize with her peers in play, work and prayer; she often taught them Christian doctrine, which she liked to attend. She had a calming effect on the girls, was well-behaved and friendly to everyone. Whenever she had time, she devoted it to prayer or listening to spiritual conversations. She often went to church and had confidential conversations with God. But she did not show off her piety.

=== First Holy Communion ===
The Gora curate Jožef Žagar firmly adhered to the old tradition that children could only receive their first Holy Communion at the age of twelve. It was not until the decree of Saint Pope Pius X on early Holy Communion "Quam singulari" of August 7, 1910, that it was possible to receive First Holy Communion already in the "years of discernment", around the age of seven.

Every day, Magdalena joined her peers in spiritual preparation, led by the curate Žagar. She carefully memorized every word the priest said, especially about the real presence of Jesus under the appearance of bread and wine in Eucharist. Magdalena quickly grasped the material and acquired the necessary knowledge. The curate Žagar, who was also her confessor, allowed her to approach the Communion table. Twelve-year-old Magdalena therefore approached her First communion in 1847 in the company of her peers. The writer of her youth, Janez Plaper, writes,

that upon this first entry into her pure heart, the Most Holy God »kindled such a burning love in her that her physical strength began to weaken. She could barely walk the few steps to her place in the pew. Here she fell to her knees and stared motionlessly at the image of Our Lady of the Snows above the altar for a quarter of an hour. When she stood up to leave the church after the Holy Mass, she heard a voice:

"Don't tell anyone what you have experienced." Astonished by the voice, she thought that the other girls could also hear it.

"No," she heard the mysterious voice again, "they do not hear this voice, but you alone. I am the one you have just consumed." A short time later, she left the church with the other girls of her age.«

== Mystical phenomena ==
Gornik's life is connected with unusual mystical phenomena, such as visions, stigmata, the renewal of Christ's suffering, living without physical food for many years, foreseeing events, unusual healings.

According to theologian Martina Kraljič, author of the book Magdalena Gornik, "In the Ljubljana Archdiocesan Archives, all sources about Magdalena Gornik are accessible to everyone, there are 6,800 pages of them" . She also said that her notes and correspondence were kept by the priest Frančišek Lampe, who also took the famous photograph of the stigmata during her ecstasy.

=== Ecstasy ===
She is said to have experienced her first ecstasy at the age of thirteen, on August 11, 1848. From August 24, 1848 until her death on February 23, 1896, she is said to have az ecstasy every evening, as well as on Fridays during Holy Week and at every mass. The ecstasies were based on the church year. During the ecstasy, her body was insensitive to external stimuli. Gornik was later able to tell everything that happened during the ecstasy, which were associated with visions and suffering; at that time, the stigmata were also said to have opened to her.

=== Visions ===
Gornik is said to have experiences visions throughout her life, the content of which varied greatly. They corresponded to the course of the Liturgical year. She had her first vision in the spring of 1847, and her last one the day before her death.

In her visions, Magdalena supposedly saw and spoke with angels, saints, Virgin Mary, and the Holy Trinity. According to her, the angels taught her about the worship of Mary and God and wept over the unbelief of people. The Virgin Mary supposedly spoke to her about chastity and prayer, encouraged her to patiently endure suffering, and invited her to contemplate the suffering and death of Jesus; Mary also appeared as an advocate for people with her Son.

On Fridays and during Lent, she witnessed Jesus' suffering. On Maundy Thursday, she also participated in the Last Supper, and on Good Friday, she witnessed Jesus' Stations of the Cross and death. On Easter, she witnessed Jesus' resurrection and then on Ascension, his ascension. Sometimes, through visions, she would follow the Holy Mass in her parish church from home.

=== Mysterious Communion ===
Magdalene is said to have received both sacramental (the kind that every believer can receive) and mystical Holy Communion (some saints). Both of these occurred most often in trance. She received Mystical Communion only in extasy. At that time, Jesus himself, a priest-saint, or an angel administered it to her. Many people, including priests, are said to have seen the host suddenly appearing in her mouth, and soon after they saw a special chalice. After such an event, Magdalena always gave thanks, and sometimes even admonished those present to do penance.

=== Stigmata ===
Magdalene is said to have received the marks of the wounds of Jesus or stigmata in November 1848 as a thirteen-year-old girl on her hands, feet and side, about which she herself wrote:

That week before Advent 1848 I received the wounds. I had known it for three weeks beforehand. All three: Jesus, Mary and St. Francis told me that I would receive them. On Wednesday at eleven o'clock I received the wounds. From the sky very thin streams of blood flowed into my hands and feet; and a thick stream flowed into my right side. It hurt me terribly. Since then my wounds have bled every Friday; and in 1849 they also bled every Wednesday. Every day they hurt me from three to four in the afternoon.

She hid her wounds so much that for a long time even her family did not know about them; until 1855 she bore visible wounds on her body. When she saw the Savior crowned with thorns or suffering in some other way in a vision, the wounds of the crown of thorns would open on her forehead. During Holy Week, the wounds of the flagellation would also open on her body. The stigmata caused her severe pain, but Magdalena did not complain. The wounds were examined by doctors, priests and visitors, but no one found any fraud.

=== Inedia ===
Up until the age of thirteen, Magdalena ate like everyone else; from September 25, 1848 until her death, she is said to have no longer needed any earthly food and she lived in inedia; she is said to have lived without any food for 47 years. She could not even bear the smell of ordinary food. Her food was said to have been the Holy Eucharist and a kind of "heavenly food", which she received only in a daze. Her attendants told the priest Lesjak that accordingly she had no bodily secretions. Despite her inedia, she easily performed her daily duties.

=== Materialization ===
Gornik is said to have received several objects in a state of extasy or materialization, which were visible not only to herself, but also to other people. One of these was an unusual or heavenly food that Gornik received almost every day at the end of the extasy. Most often, she received it in a vision from the Virgin Mary or from an angel. Eyewitnesses reported that this dish was in the form of a small piece or grain, often of different colors.

Another peculiarity was the cross that Gornik supposedly received in the extasy and that remained on her chest even after that. This cross was said to have hung on her body without any string and never fell to the ground. Several priests held this cross in their hands; they described its dimensions and color in detail.

=== Levitation and weightless ===
Levitation is a mystical phenomenon in which a human body is lifted into the air, floats in the air, or moves without any natural aid. The opposite of this phenomenon is weightless, when even an otherwise weak body becomes so heavy that others cannot move it or can do so only with great difficulty. There are reports of both phenomena in the case of Magdalene.

Magdalene's levitation is said to have occurred most often when she strongly desired to receive Holy Communion; at that time her body rose into the air. She is also said to have levitated when the priest blessed the Most Holy, during the mystical death on Good Friday and the mystical resurrection on Easter morning. The heaviness is said to have occurred when Magdalena was in a ecstasy.

=== Xenoglossy ===
In a state of extasy, Magdalena had gift of xenoglossy (speaking of foreign languages or glossolalia); she had understood and spoken languages that she had never learned or heard spoken. She spoke Latin, Greek, Hebrew, Babylonian and other, even non-European, languages. Some of the languages she spoke in trance were not recognized even by the greatest language experts.

=== Clairvoyance ===
Clairvoyance (cardiognomy) is a mystical phenomenon by which a person recognizes and, so to speak, sees the state of the human soul. Magdalena is also said to have the gift of insight into the inner state of the soul: whether someone is in Sanctifying grace or in Mortal sin; whoever asked her, she also revealed his state of soul to him: not only to believers, but also to many priests. Magdalena also revealed his shortcomings to her spiritual leader, the curate Žagar.

=== Prophecies ===
Magdalena received many prophecies during her lifetime. On August 2, 1848, she predicted the flight of Pope Pius IX from Rome. She mentioned this event to Jernej Krže from Vinica at the beginning of November 1848. That same month, on November 24, 1848, the Pope actually had to flee from Rome to Gaeta due to the tense political situation.

She also allegedly predicted various plagues, disasters, and evils.

== Letters ==
There are many written documents about Gornik. Among them are her own handwritten letters, as well as handwritten reports from people who observed her and wrote reports to the diocese or to newspapers. How she was affected by the opposition and with what spirit she accepted it is shown by this handwritten letter she wrote to the fifty-year-old Franciscan brother Tobija Vernik (1801-1886)on June 14, 1851. Because of ancient language written in bohoričica may make it difficult today for some Slovenes to read too, so we are bringing it here, as it is written in original, then in modern Slovene and finally in English translation:

Original text in bohoričica

O jest dobro vem, de imam dosti nasprotnikou Bogu bodi sahvala, di sim savolj Njega sanizhvana.
Res je, de Bog nas s’mnogim terpljenjam obiskuje, pa sahvalimo Ga lepo, de nas tukaj obishe, in prosimo Ga, de bi nas tukaj po svojim dopadajenju szhistil, na unim svetu pa nam dobrotlivo persanesil.
Magdalena Gornik.

Modern Slovenian

O jaz dobro vem, da imam dosti nasprotnikov. Bogu bodi zahvala, da sem zavoljo Njega zaničevana.
Res je, da nas Bog obiskuje z mnogim trpljenjem, pa zahvalimo Ga lepo, da nas tukaj obišče, in prosimo Ga, da bi nas tukaj po svojem dopadanju sčistil, na onem svetu pa nam dobrotljivo prizanesel.
Magdalena Gornik

English translation

Oh, I know very well that I have many opponents. Thank God that I am despised for His sake.
It is true that God visits us with many sufferings, so let us thank Him well that He visits us here, and let us ask Him to purify us here according to His will, and in the next world to spare us kindly.
Magdalena Gornik.

== Death and veneration ==
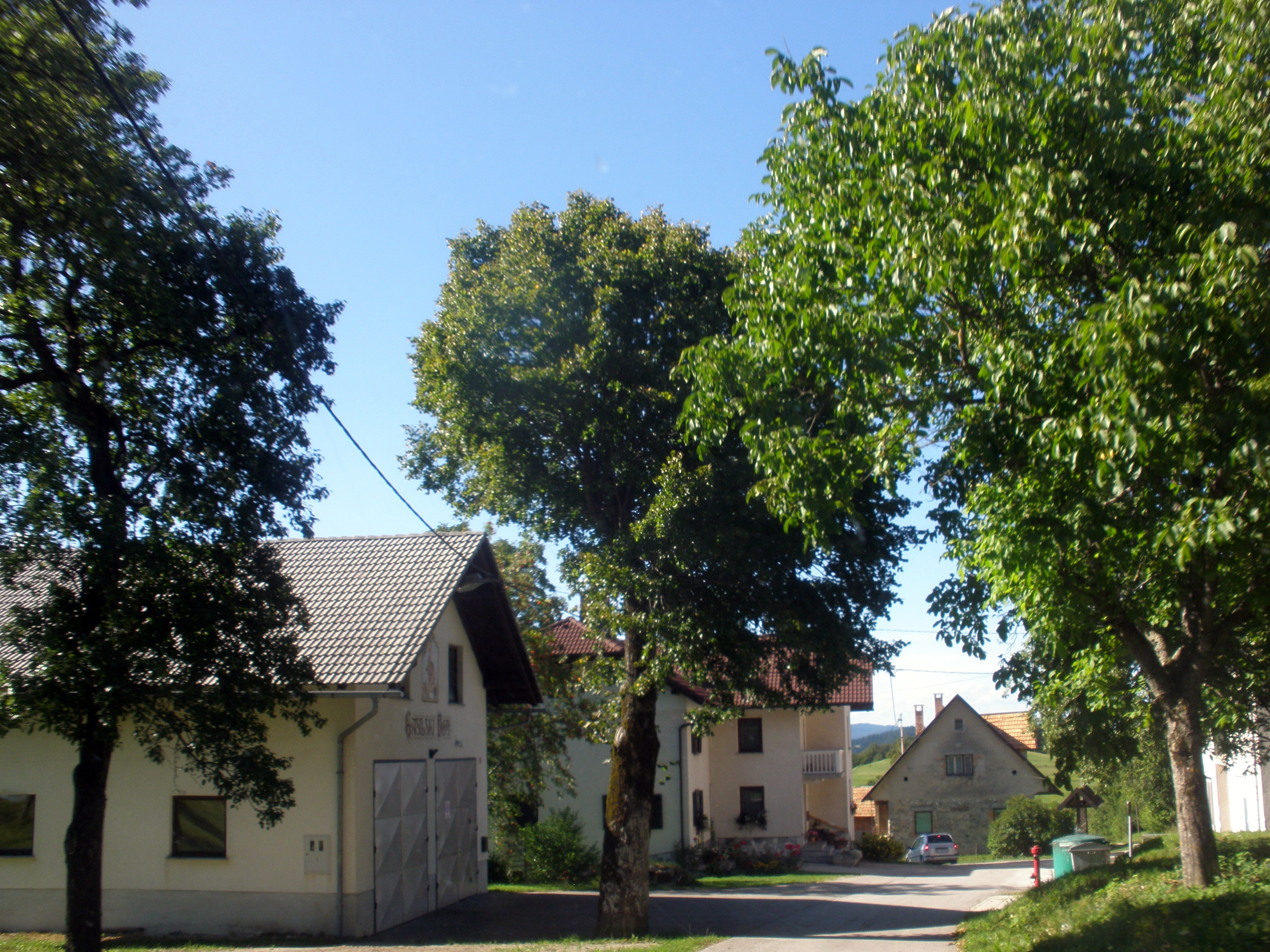
In this house in Petrinci, where the Fire Station is now, Magdalena Gornik died in year 1896.

Magdalena Gornik died on February 23, 1896. Her relatives, all of whom were poor, worried about providing food for the funeral guests. Before dying, Gornik reassured them, saying God would see to it that everything would be alright. Due to snow and cold, only eight mourners gathered at the open grave for the funeral. Today, numerous pilgrims gather at her grave, pleading for her intercession with God.

=== Memory ===
Although Gornik opposed both secular and church authorities, whose main concern was to limit pilgrims, church authorities softened towards her after her death.

Archbishop of Maribor Marjan Turnšek:

It is surprising how Magdalene, even as a young girl, was able to accept so much suffering. The authenticity of the events can also be inferred from her maturation and growth in a virtuous life. Although unusual mystical phenomena did not yet guarantee holiness, it seems that in the life of Magdalene Gornik, virtues gradually developed towards a heroic level.

Cardinal Franc Rode

Given the extraordinary occurrence of mystical experiences and the saintly life of Magdalena Gornik, it is natural to think of the process for beatification and canonization. Other nations would have done this long ago. (Rome, September 3, 2008)

Archbishop of Ljubljana Stanislav Zore:

He said on the "Sunday of the Saint Candidates of the Ljubljana Metropolis", which was held on September 17, 2023, in the Sodražica parish church, in relation to Magdalena Gornik:

"We gathered in Sodražica because a church investigation was held in this parochial house from March 2 to April 11, 1852, by order of the bishop Anton Wolf. The Sodražica parish priest Lesjak and other close priests were shocked to be convinced of the authenticity of the mystical phenomena and that 'Magdalena Gornik is not an impostor', as the liberal media of the time and also the secular authorities declared her to be." According to the archbishop, he has a message also for today and teaches us:

1. Acceptance of suffering; she said that "the Mother of God comforts those who follow Jesus, suffer with Jesus and remain faithful to him".
2. Rejection of violence and euthanasia, which means a cowardly flight from suffering. Today there is a universal tendency to completely remove suffering from life: to erase not only suffering, but also oneself from the book of eternal life. Christ and Magdalene teach us that inevitable suffering is a purifier of the soul and a sufficient remedy for one's own and others' sins, which closes the gates of hell and opens the gates of heaven. Slovenian writer France Bevk also wrote that in the hours of suffering he received more than in all the years of a peaceful and comfortable life.
3. Expression of generous forgiveness, as the Slovenian teacher Ivanka Škrabec Novak from Hrovača was capable of, who did not want to betray her husband Franc. Therefore, on the morning of June 3, 1942, the Tito’s Partisans tortured terribly her, a mother in her sixth month of pregnancy, and then drove into the forest, where she had to dig her own grave; in vain she begged for the life of her unborn child, to whom she wrote a farewell letter, which was later found: "I will not be alone in death: you will be with me, my child, and Mary, who will carry us to an eternally happy home". No grudges, no revenge, but a single expression of love and consolation. The saints and also Serve of God Magdalene educated Ivanka and teach us in forgiveness, which heals the wounds in the heart of an individual, within families, in our communities in our nation and all over the world.

Painter Lojze Čemažar

In 2000, Magdalena Gornik was depicted by the academic painter Lojze Čemažar, together with some other Slovenian saints, in a fresco of the outer chapel of the Church of the Queen of Peace in Kurešček. According to his own testimony, he saw in a dream the place where he should paint her, as well as her size, appearance and attributes (cross, crown of thorns, mystical communion).

=== Canonization procedure ===
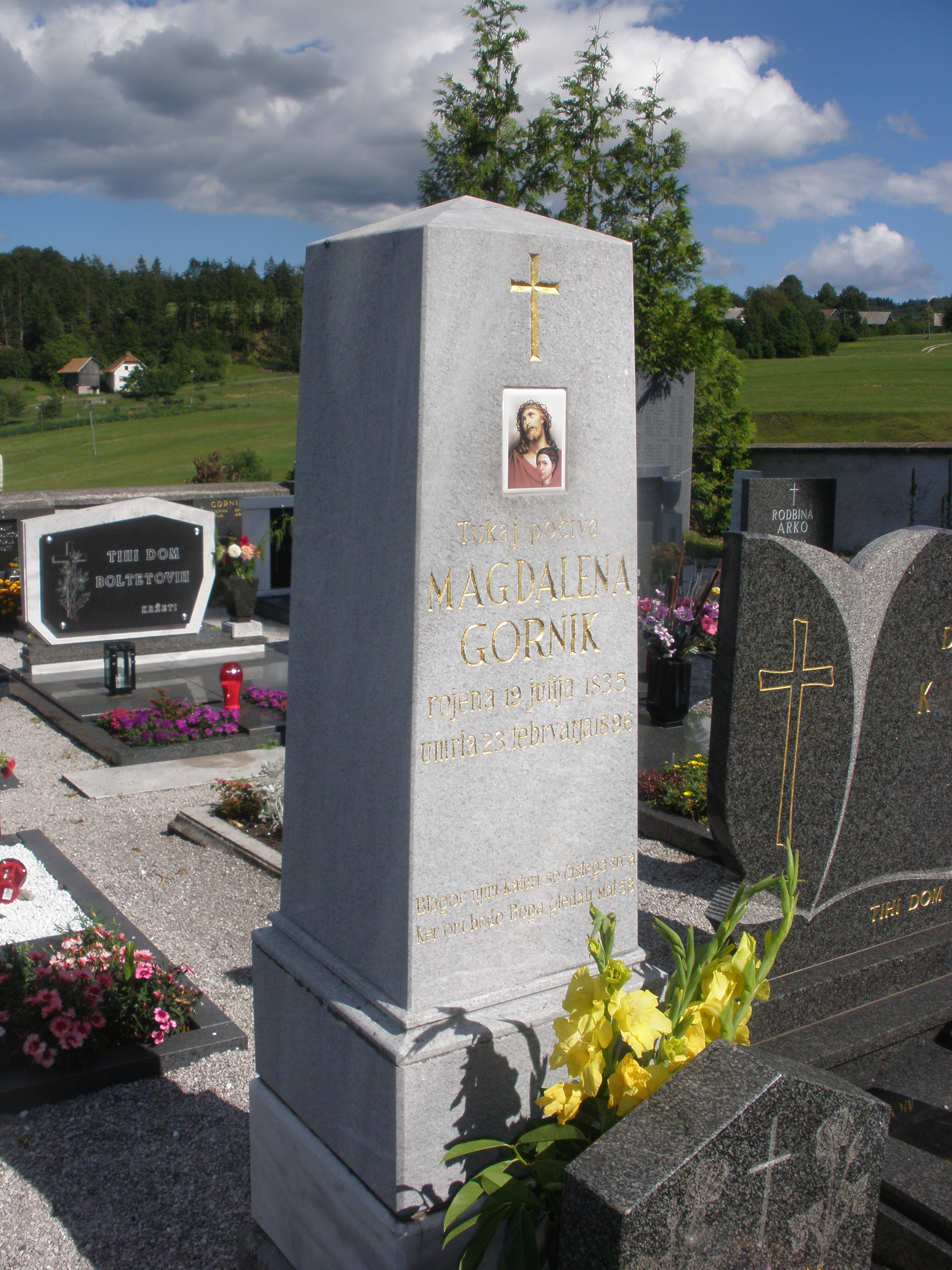
In this grave at Gora, Magdalena was buried next to her relatives. Nowadays, an increasing number of pilgrims travel here.

==== »Eppur si muove!« ====
»Eppur si muove!« one could almost exclaim, when the cases related to or Magdalena Gornik or Šmetova Lenčka finally started to move from a dead end after a good century of neglect and oblivion. The initiative for the procedure was received by the Archdiocese of Ljubljana in 2003 and the then Archbishop Franc Rode was in favor of the matter, but he was called the following year to a new position in the central leadership of the Church and the matter temporarily stalled again.

On September 24, 2018, all Slovenian bishops at the 108th regular session of the Slovenian Bishops' Conference unanimously supported the initiation of the procedure. The Code of Canon Law and other Church regulations require in this regard that the competent bishop appoint a special postulator or facilitator of the canonical process:

The Postulator is legitimately appointed by the Actor with a mandate as Postulator and ratified in writing by the competent ecclesiastical authority, which is the Bishop in the diocesan phase and the Congregation for the Causes of Saints in the Roman phase. (6b)

On February 19, 2019, the Archbishop of Ljubljana and Metropolitan Stanislav Zore appointed Postulator the long-time editor of Družina Franci Petrič, who said in this regard: "My tasks are two:

1. first, in the process I must prove the credible and extensive meaning of sainthood about the candidate;
2. the second task is to prove the widespread opinion among the faithful about the graces received from God through her intercession."

==== Green light to start the procedure ====
After thorough investigations by the Holy See regarding her "hearing of sainthood", on November 23, 2021, the Congregation for the Causes of Saints issued permission for the Archdiocese of Ljubljana to start the procedure for Magdalena's canonization. Everything seems to indicate that her prediction that miracles would begin to occur through her intercession in six generations is now beginning to come true. The perceptible veneration among the faithful and the hearings of her intercession are the conditions for initiating the process for her beatification. If a miracle occurs, which is recognized as such by the supreme church authority after extremely thorough investigations, there will be no more obstacles to her beatification; similarly later for the canonisation.

On the feast of the Feast of the Exaltation of Holy Cross, September 14, 2022, the process began and is progressing well under the postulator's guidance. She now holds the honorable title of Servant of God.

== Reception ==
=== Newspapers of the time ===
In general, newspapers of the time were not in favor of mystical phenomena: significantly less so than today, when such writing or reporting does not bother anyone. The events at Gora were first informed by Bleiweis's Novice. An unsigned author from Ljubljana stumbled upon Magdalena in the Newspaper section on June 6, 1849; Although he did not see her himself, he declared her — according to rumors — to be sick, and he writes as follows:

We must take this opportunity to say that these days we have heard about the so-called disappearance of a girl at Gora in the Ribnica district, such that she is either really sick or a fraud, who was set up by some hidden imposter or fraudster, if everything that people spread about this girl around the world is true... So let's not make miracles out of things that are either really sick or a fraud.

In the Vienna newspaper »Der Lloyd« (1848-1854), an unsigned reporter also from Ljubljana wrote in German on July 29, 1849:

In a certain village in the Ribnica district, a young girl in a magnetized state is said to be causing great excitement, because large crowds flock to her and have her prophesy, believing that she is a saint. This delusion is said to be promoted, as I hear, by the local clergy. Therefore, the bishop's council would strongly support the measures (to be carried out by the political authorities) with the transfer, if unforeseen obstacles were encountered among the superstitious people.

When this newspaper mentions that the girl was "magnetized", it means that she was hypnotized; this term was understood by the common people at that time; today we understand magnetism in its narrower, i.e. physical sense. When doctor from Kočevje Česnik during his professional observation of her phenomena commissioned by the authorities, he did indeed try to hypnotize her, he never succeeded and concluded that she was not susceptible to such experiments at all.

=== Church authorities ===
The bishop of Ljubljana Anton Wolf initially acted on newspaper reports, saying that it was a fraud. At the same time, the civil authorities began to pressure him to take action. However, he was aware that action by the civil authorities was not necessary. However, he adhered to the least demanding principle, that it was necessary to wait and investigate the matter. He ordered the responsible priests to report to him regularly on the matter, while at the same time trying to stop the influx of pilgrims. In order not to encourage people to make pilgrimages, neither Wolf nor his successors ever personally visited Gornik's Magdalene; at the same time, he did not send any authorized representative from the diocese in this regard.

The leadership of the Slovenian Church was probably overly cautious for many decades — also due to bad experiences with the impostor Vodiška Johanca, although it did not express any doubt about the miraculous events in connection with Magdalena's life. For several reasons, the process for declaring her blessed was not initiated for an extremely long time, although these unusual witnessed events recommended such a procedure from the church's point of view.

== See also ==
- Father Pius
- Saint Francis of Assisi
- Theresa Neumann

== Gallery ==
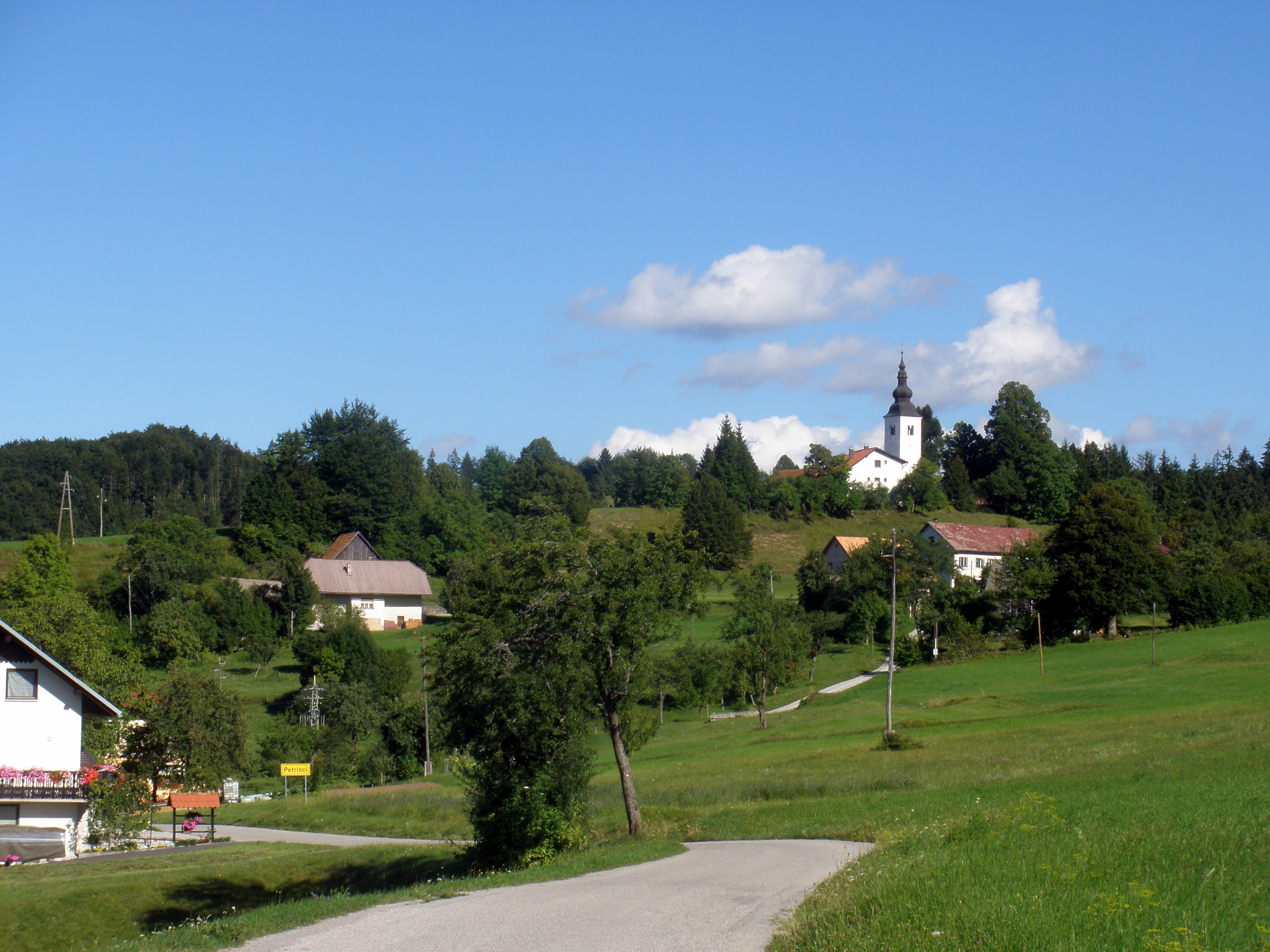
Petrinci with the church at Gora

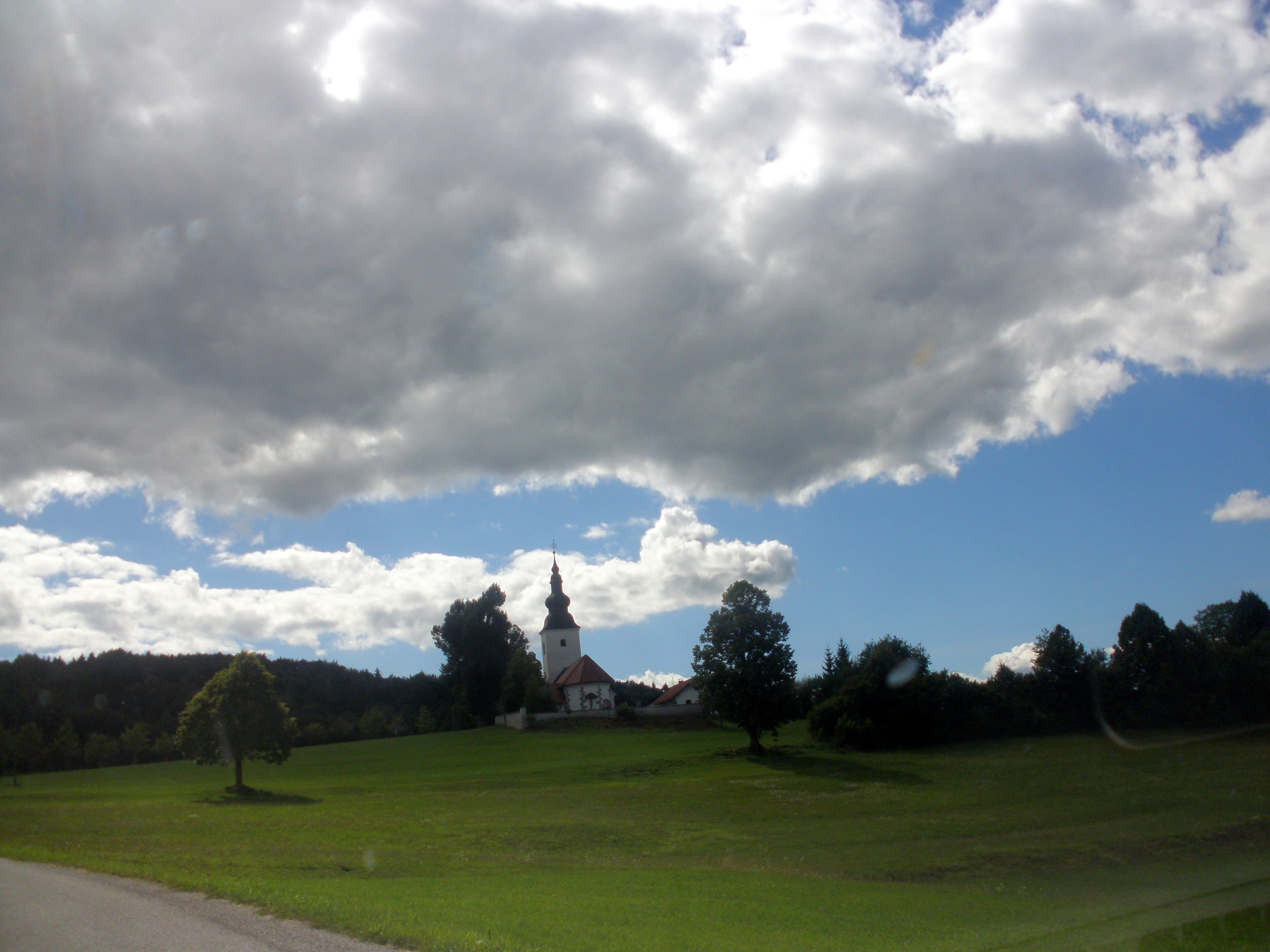
Gora pri Sodražici

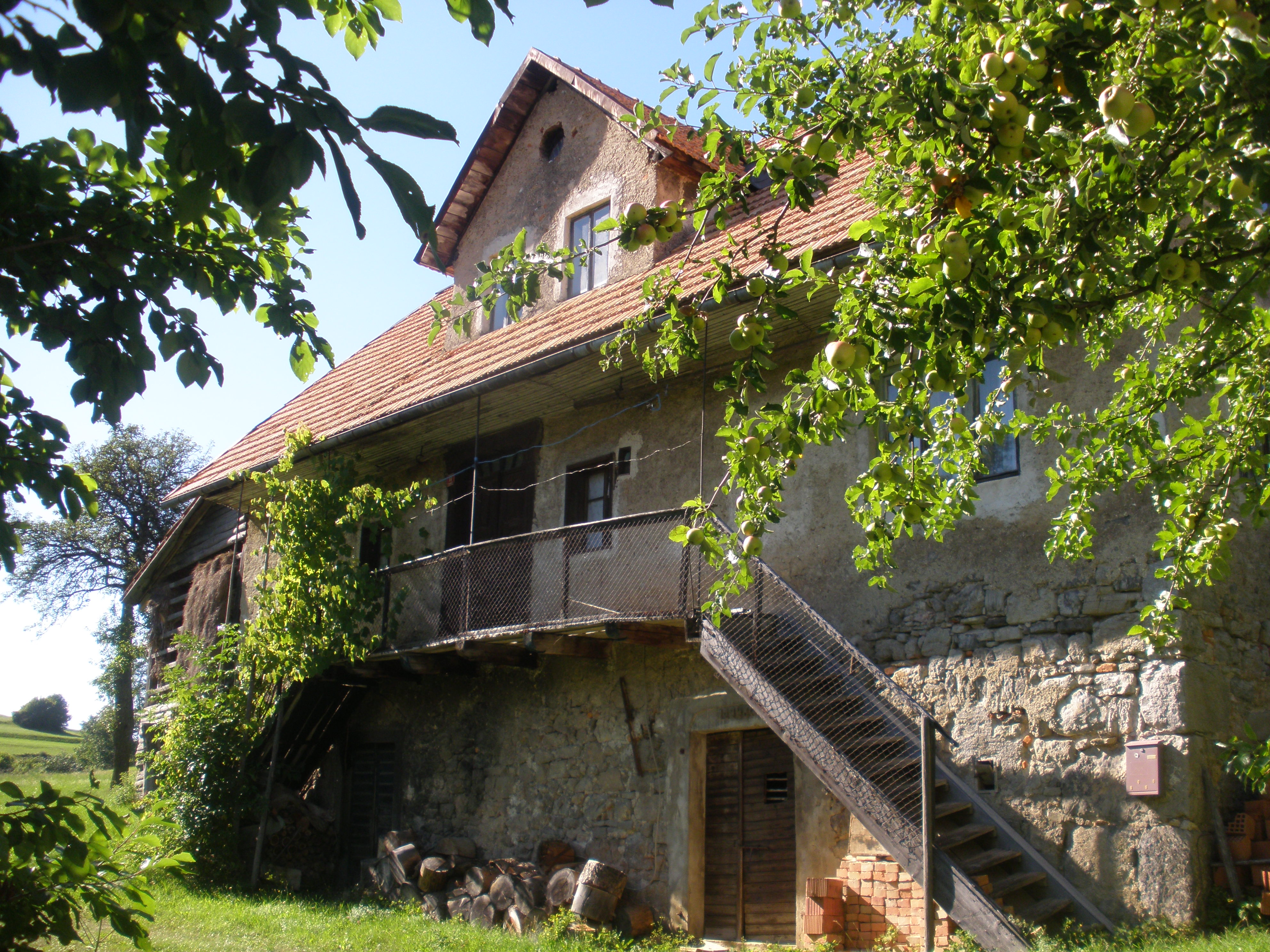
Magdalena Gornik was born here

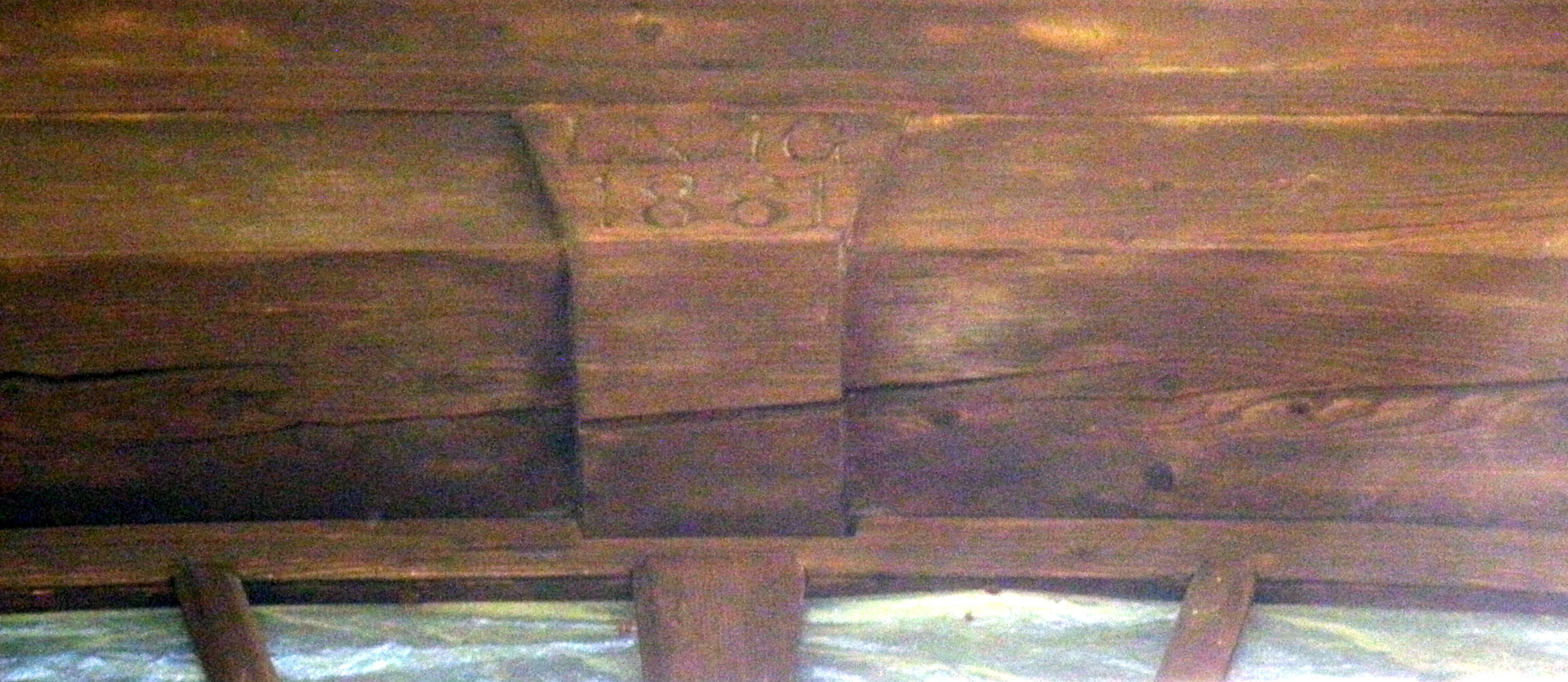
A brother built a new house on the site of the fire in 1881

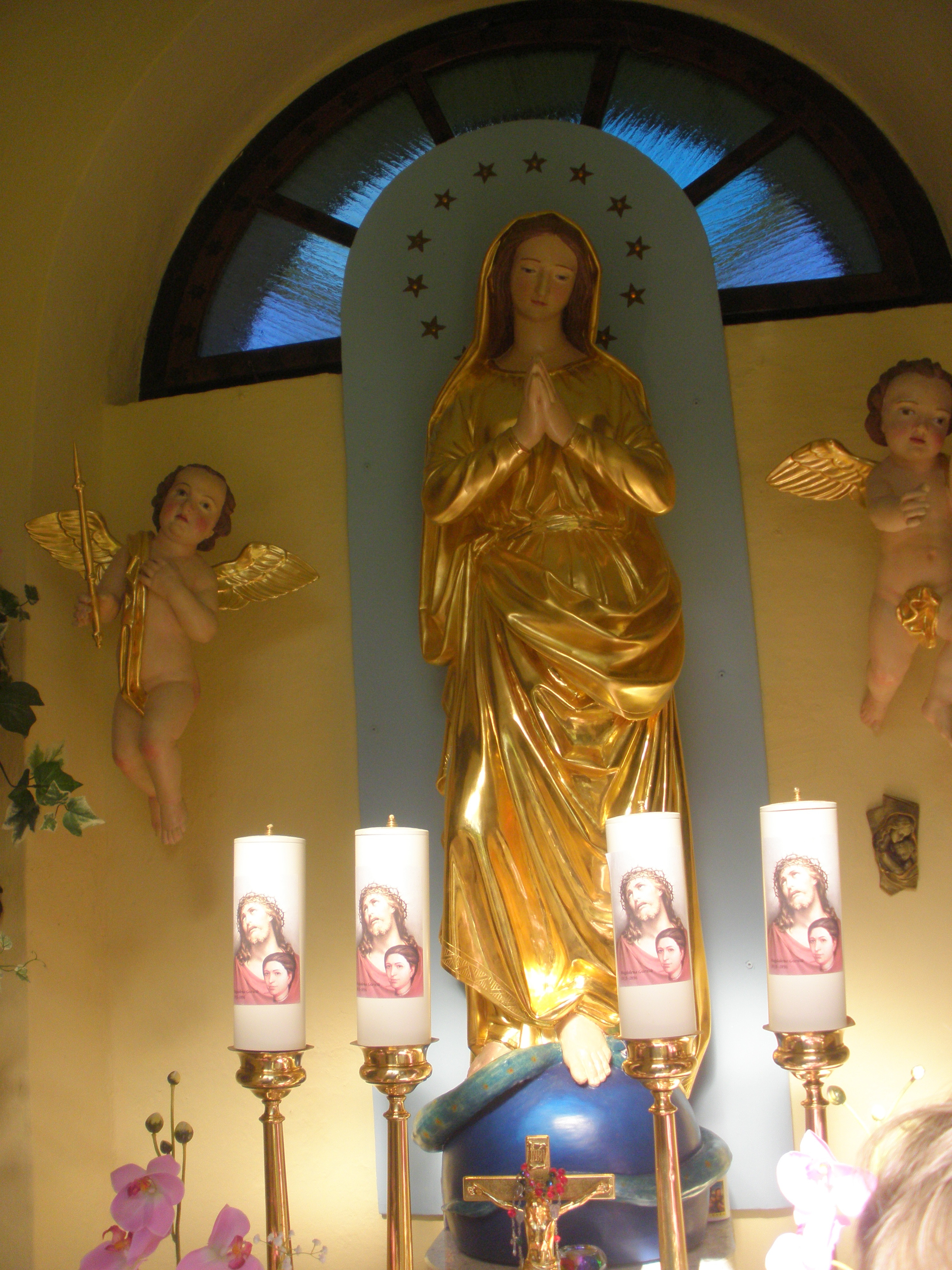
Magdalena went to this holy place often to pray

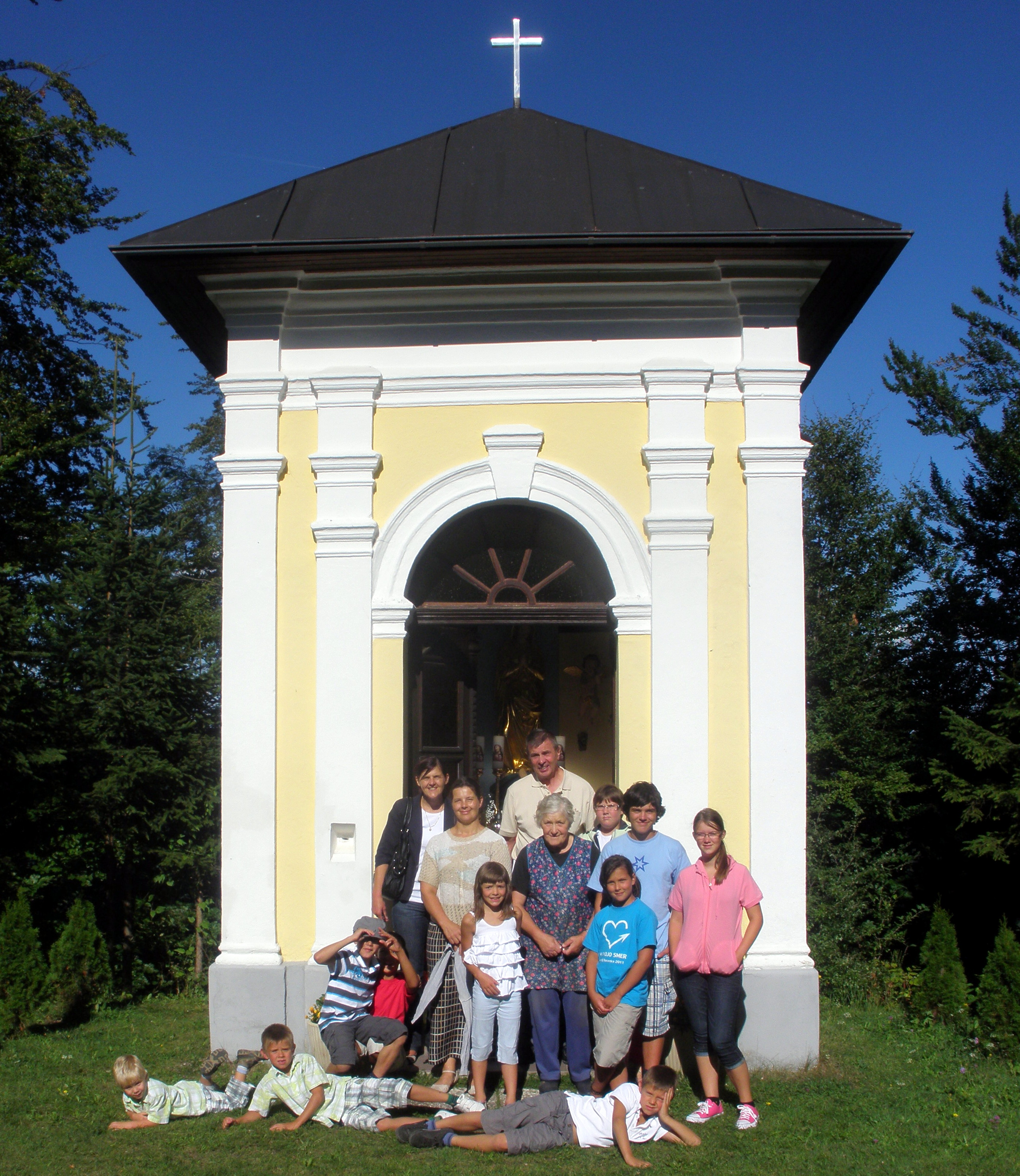
Many pilgrims come to this chapel which stands just a little lower than her birthplace

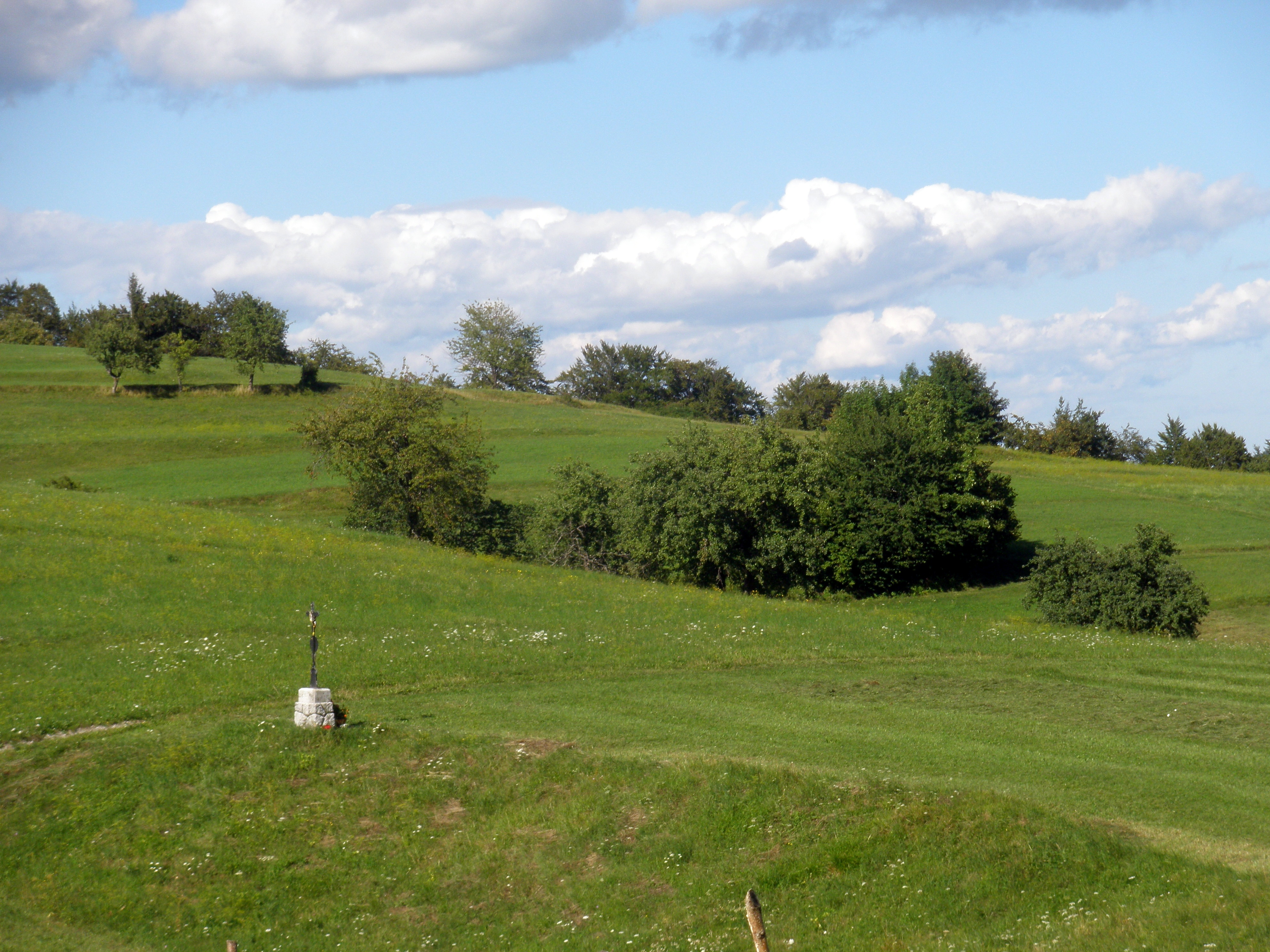
Magdalena is said to have had her first vision at this cross

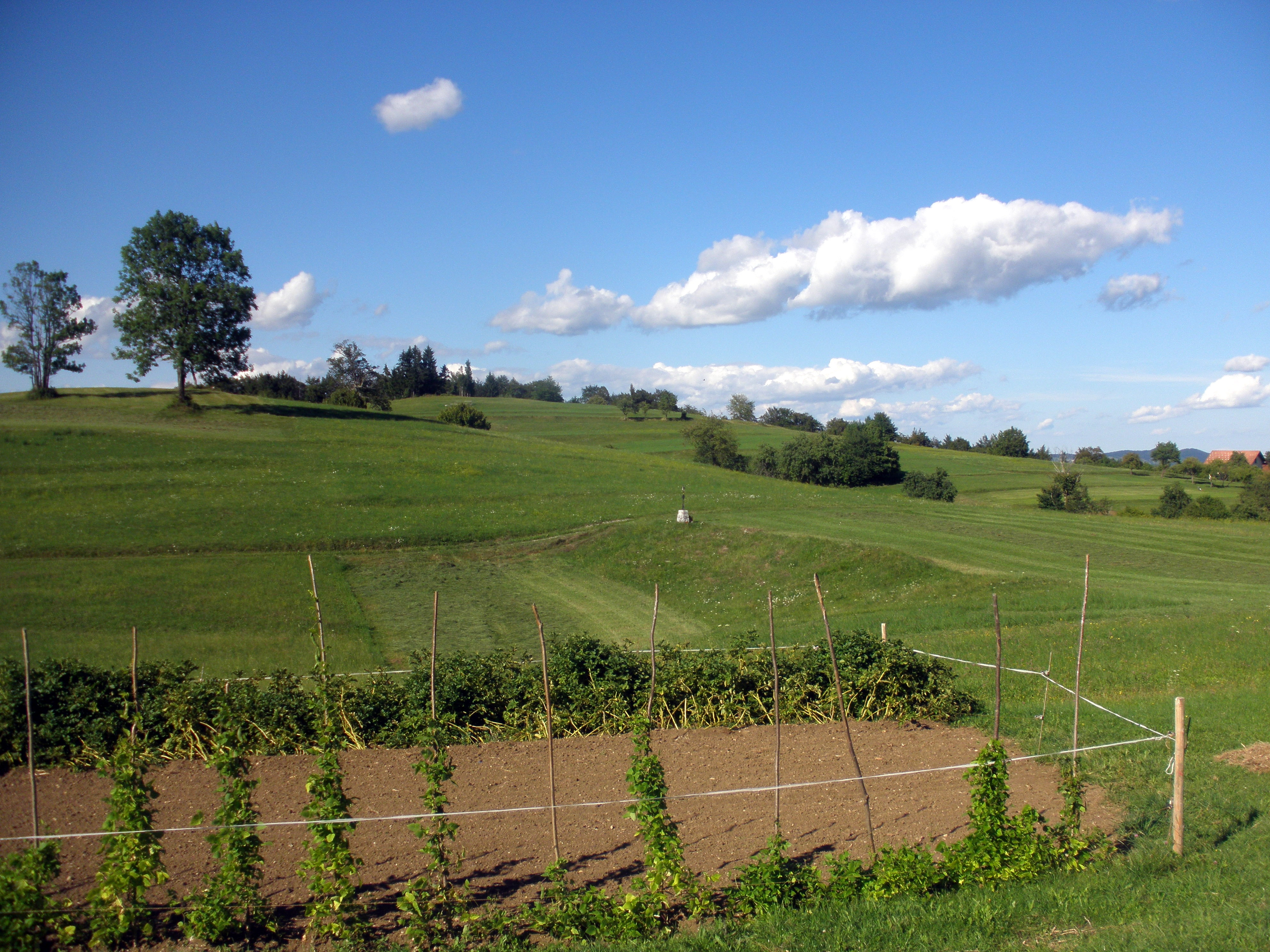
Holy Mary is said to have appeared to her at this place

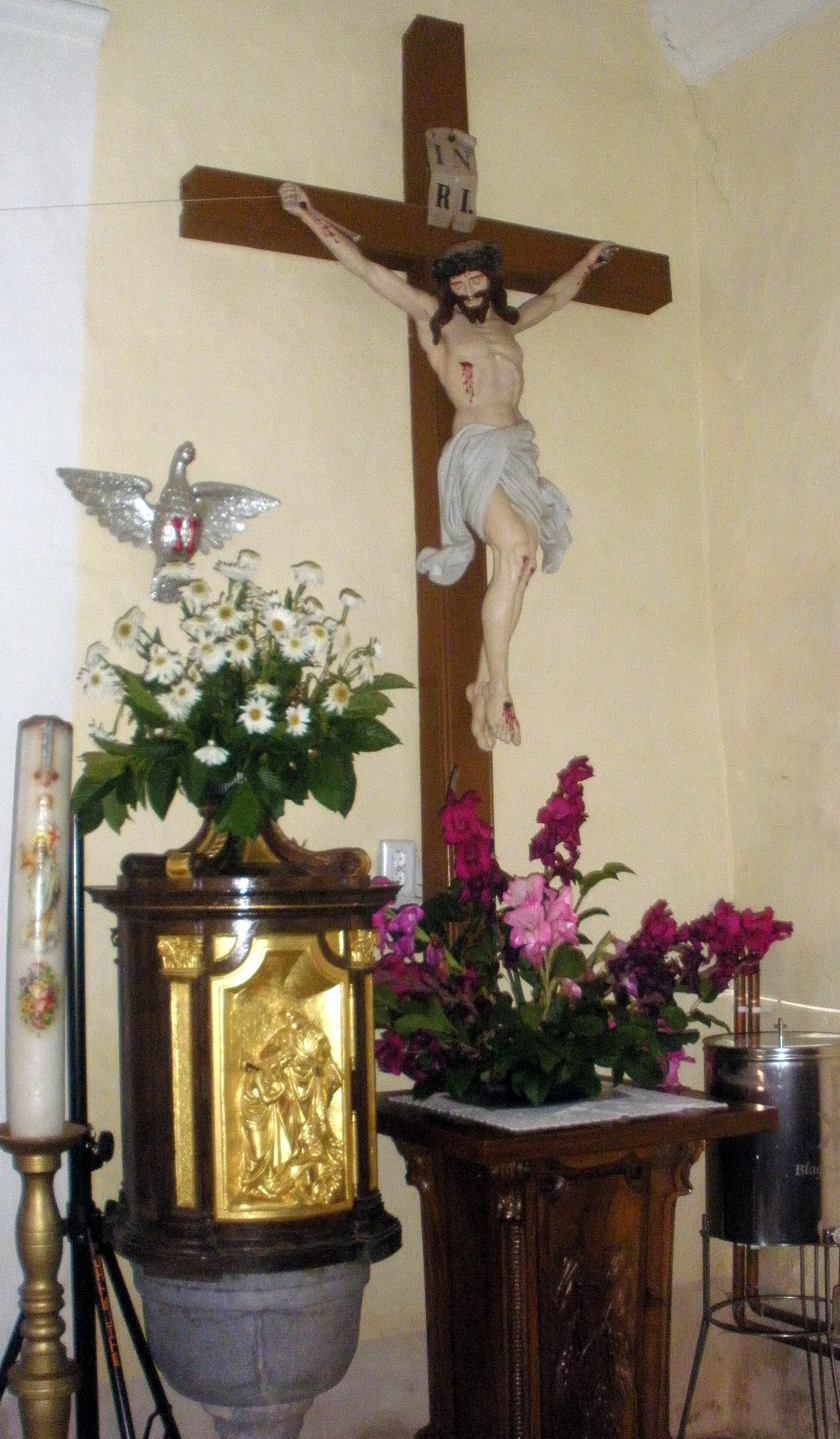
This is where Magdalene was baptized

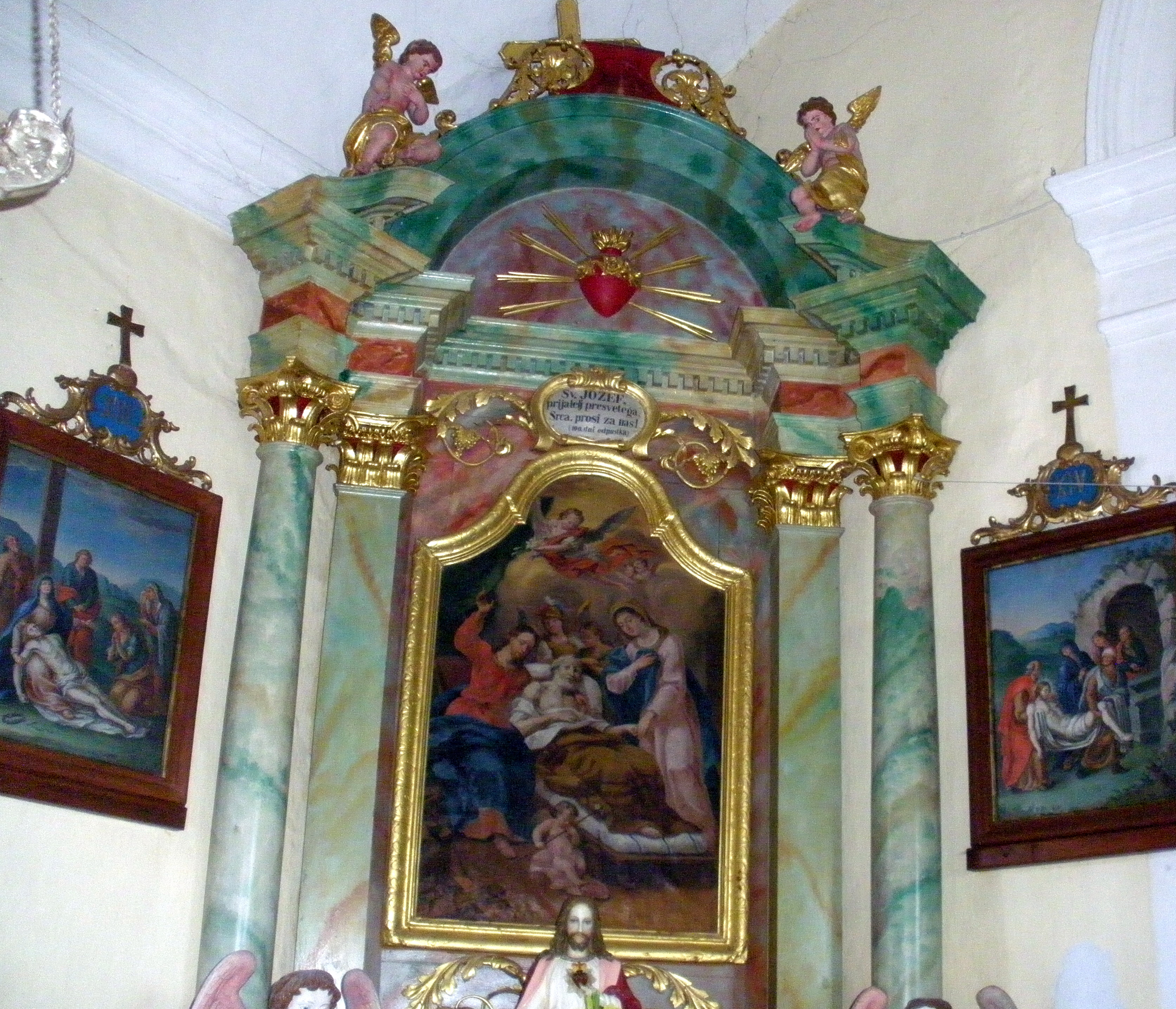
Altar of St. Joseph in the church at Gora

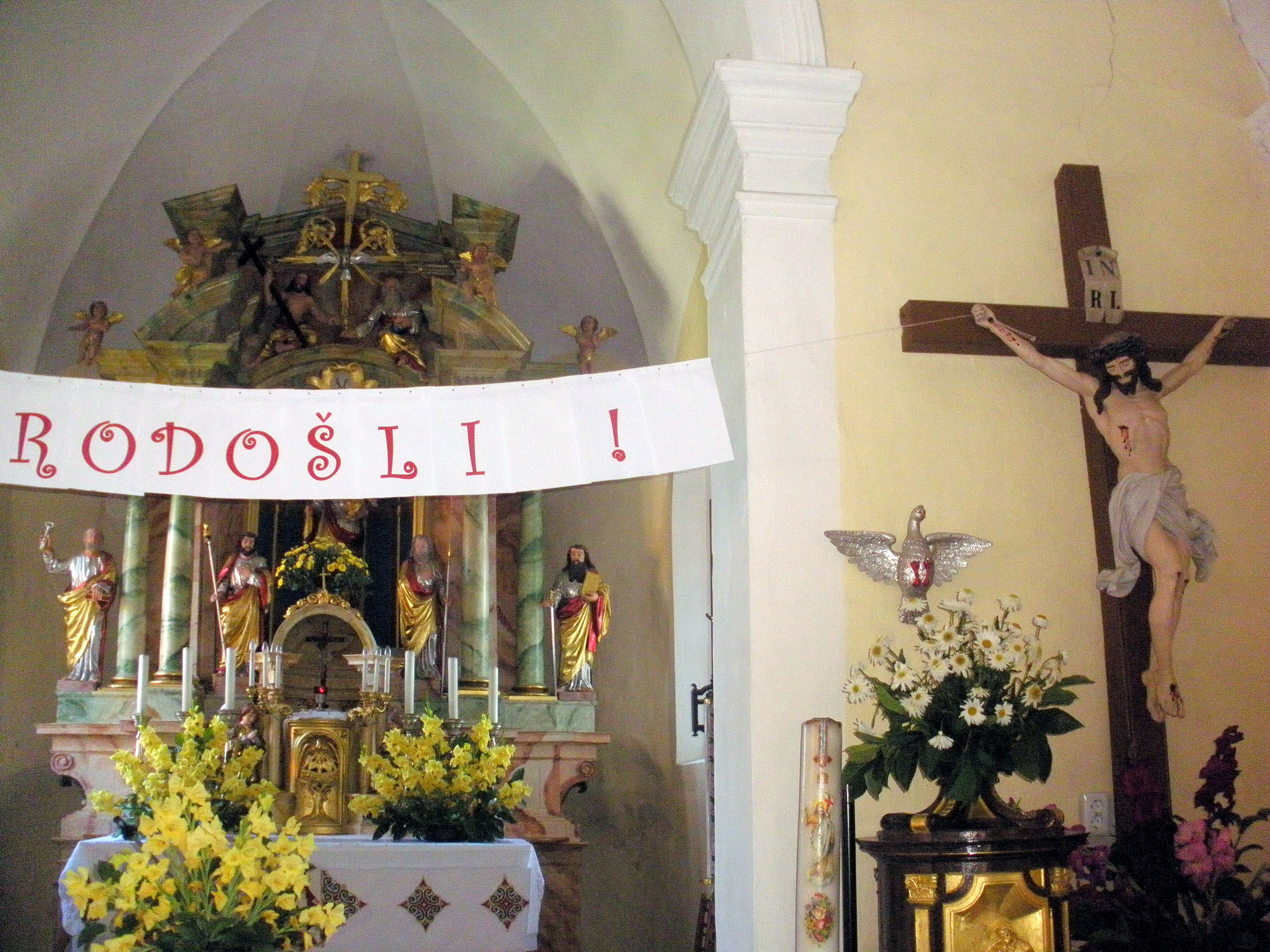
Altar of Mary of the Snows and baptistery

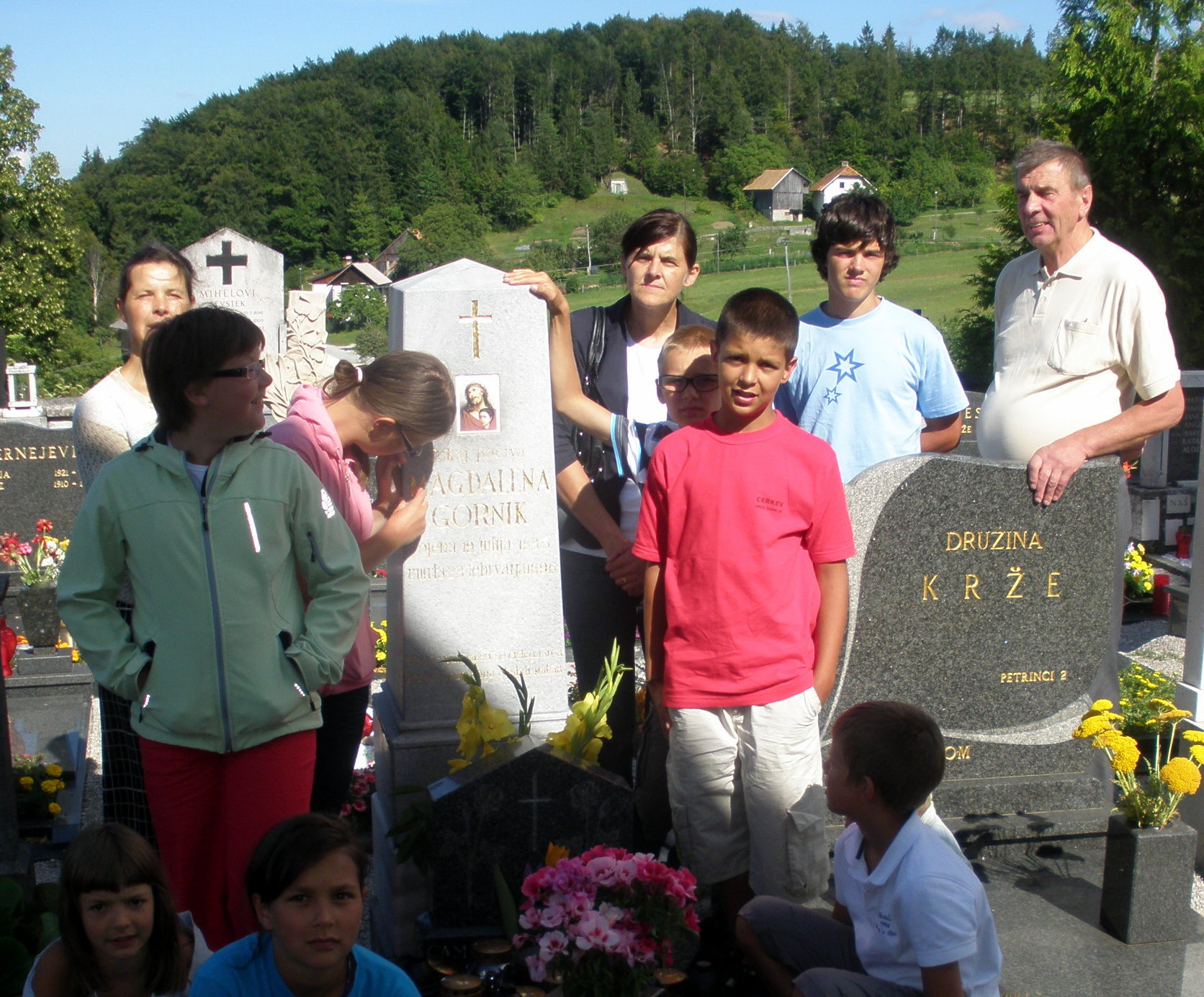
Pilgrims come to Magdalene's grave

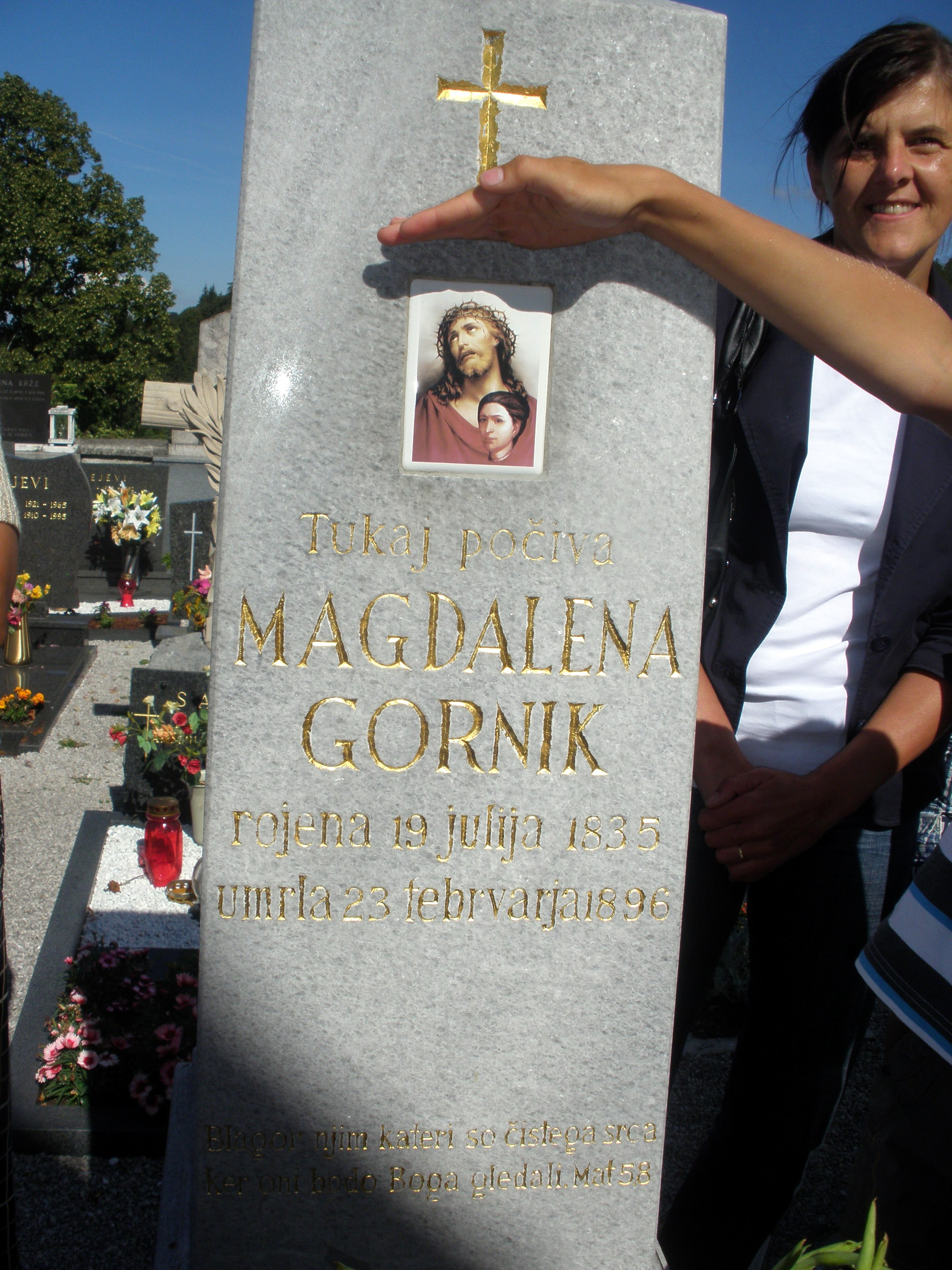
Pilgrims recommend themselves to Magdalene's intercession

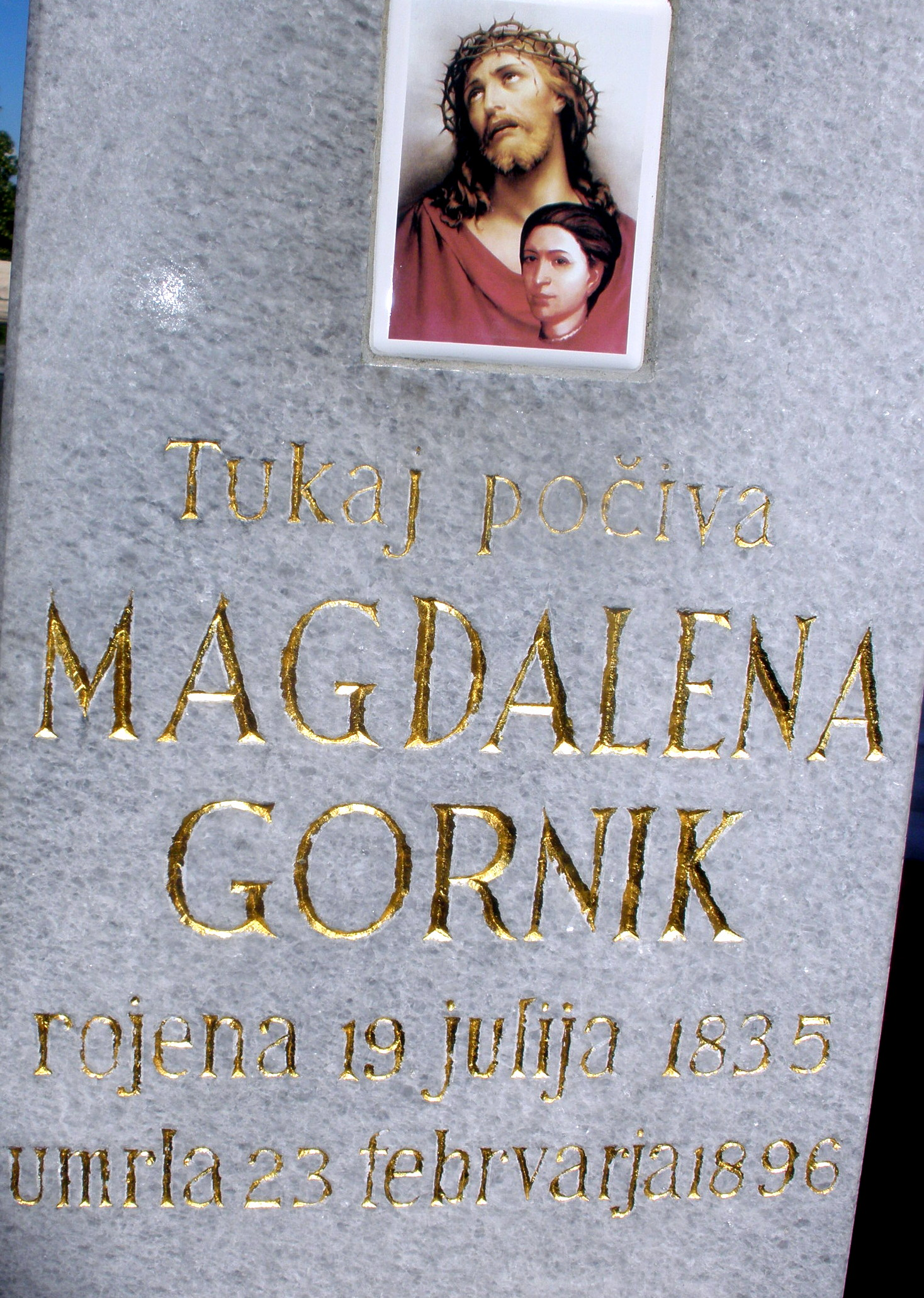
Magdalene's grave

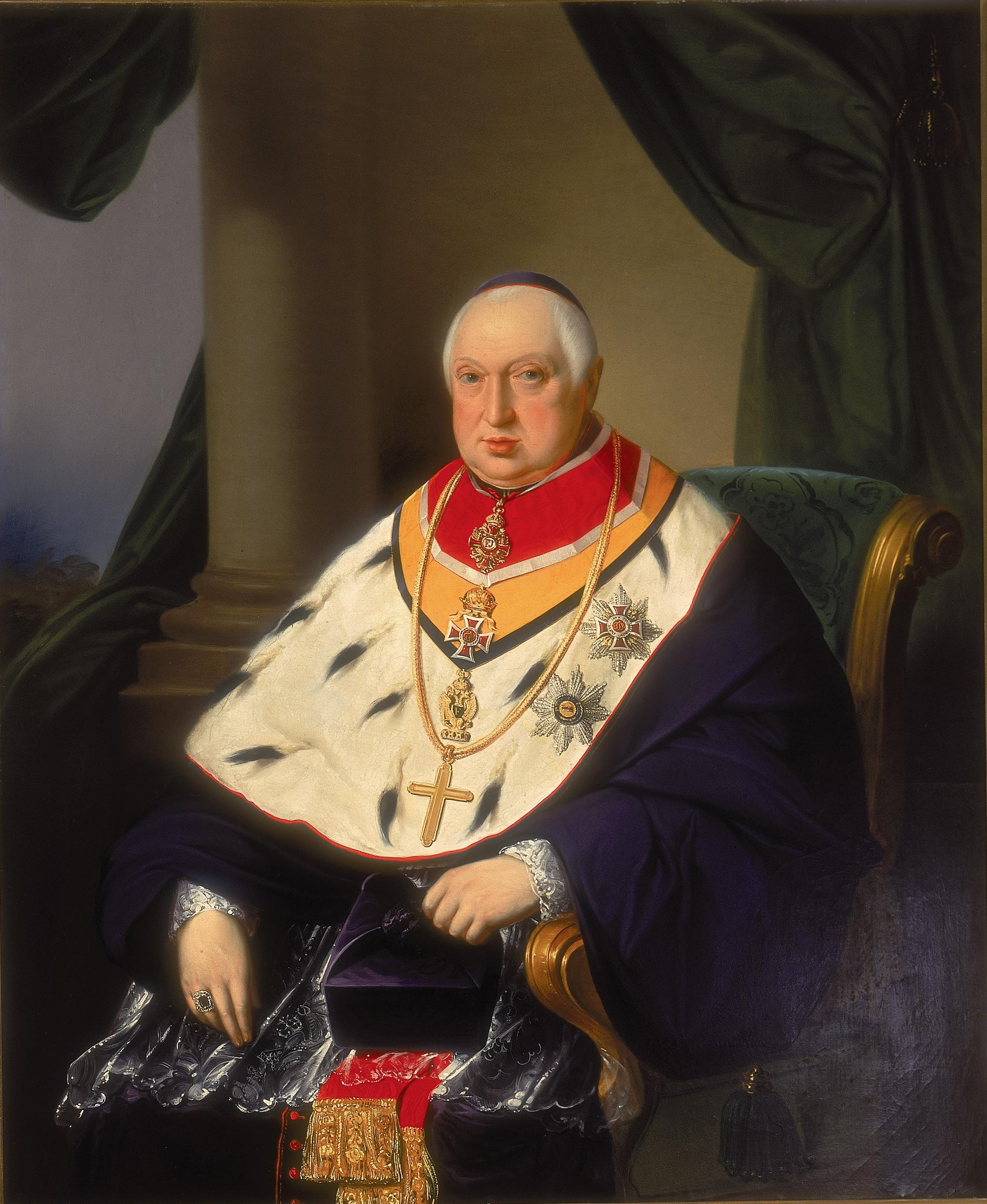
Stroj 1857: Ljubljana bishop Wolf

== Film ==
- OKRONANA (Crowned) — a film about the mystic Magdalena Gornik | YouTube
- Jožica Kolar: Slovenian mystic — Magdalena Gornik, film commentary
- (Video) Do you know the mystic Magdalena Gornik? Watch the movie! Written by A. S.
- Interesting facts: (Video) Mary's apparition to Magdalena Gornik
