= Petrinci =

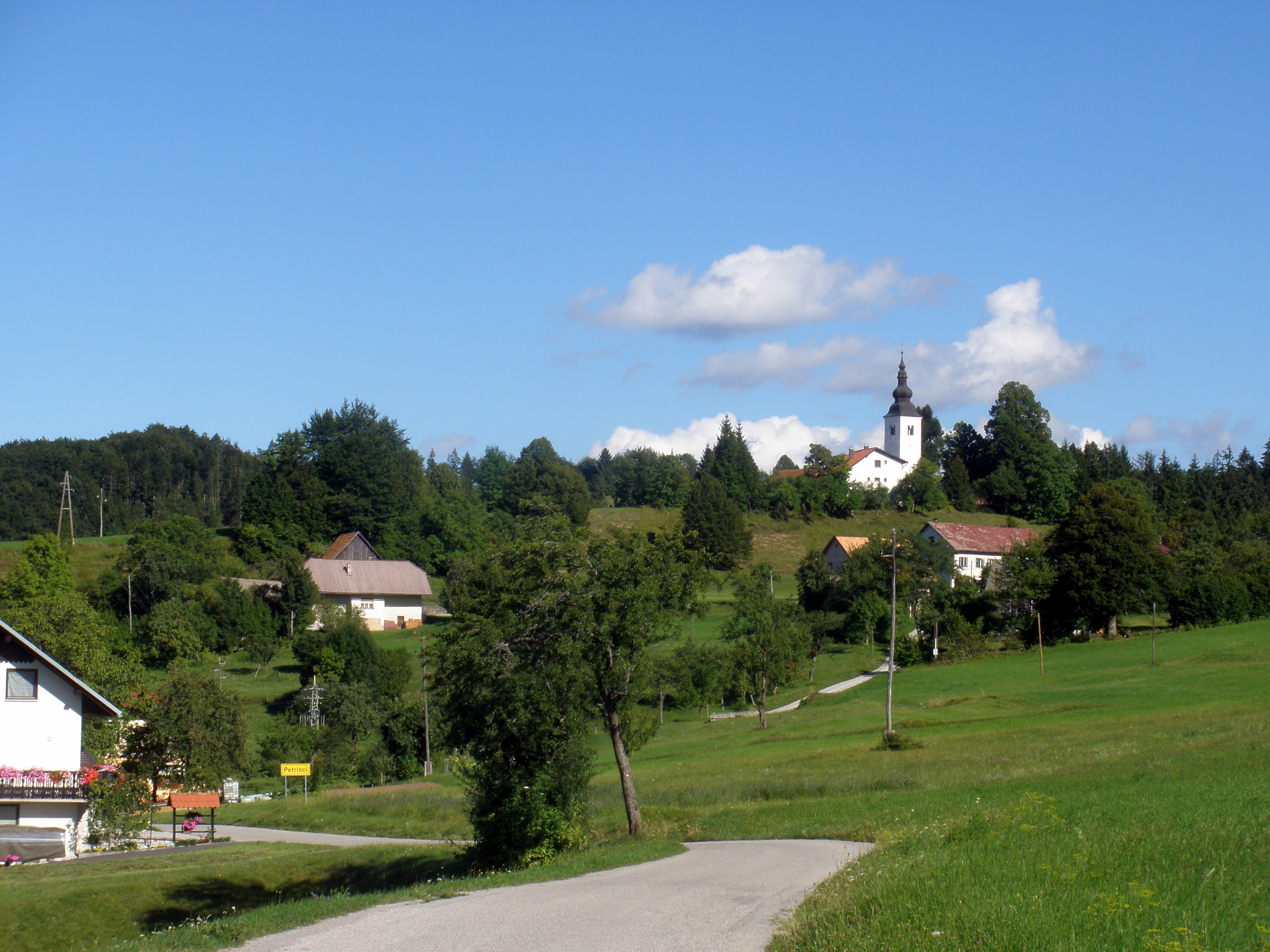

- Location in Slovenia
- Coordinates: 45°45′6.94″N 14°35′37.28″E
- Country: Slovenia
- Traditional region: Lower Carniola
- Statistical region: Southeast Slovenia
- Municipality: Sodražica

Area
  - Total: 0.81 km^{2} (0.31 sq mi)
- Elevation: 848 m (2,782 ft)

Population (2002)
  - Total: 32
- Postal code: 1317

Petrinci (pronounced [pɛˈtɾiːntsi]) is a settlement in the hills west of Sodražica in southern Slovenia. The area is part of the traditional region of Lower Carniola and is now included in the Southeast Slovenia Statistical Region.

Together with the villages of Betonovo, Kračali, Janeži, and Kržeti it comprises the community and Parish of Gora nad Sodražico, also known as Gora.

The local church is dedicated to the Our Lady of the Snows. It was a medieval chapel to which a nave was added in the 18th century.

== Notable people ==
- Magdalena Gornik (1835–1896), mystic
