= Kržeti =

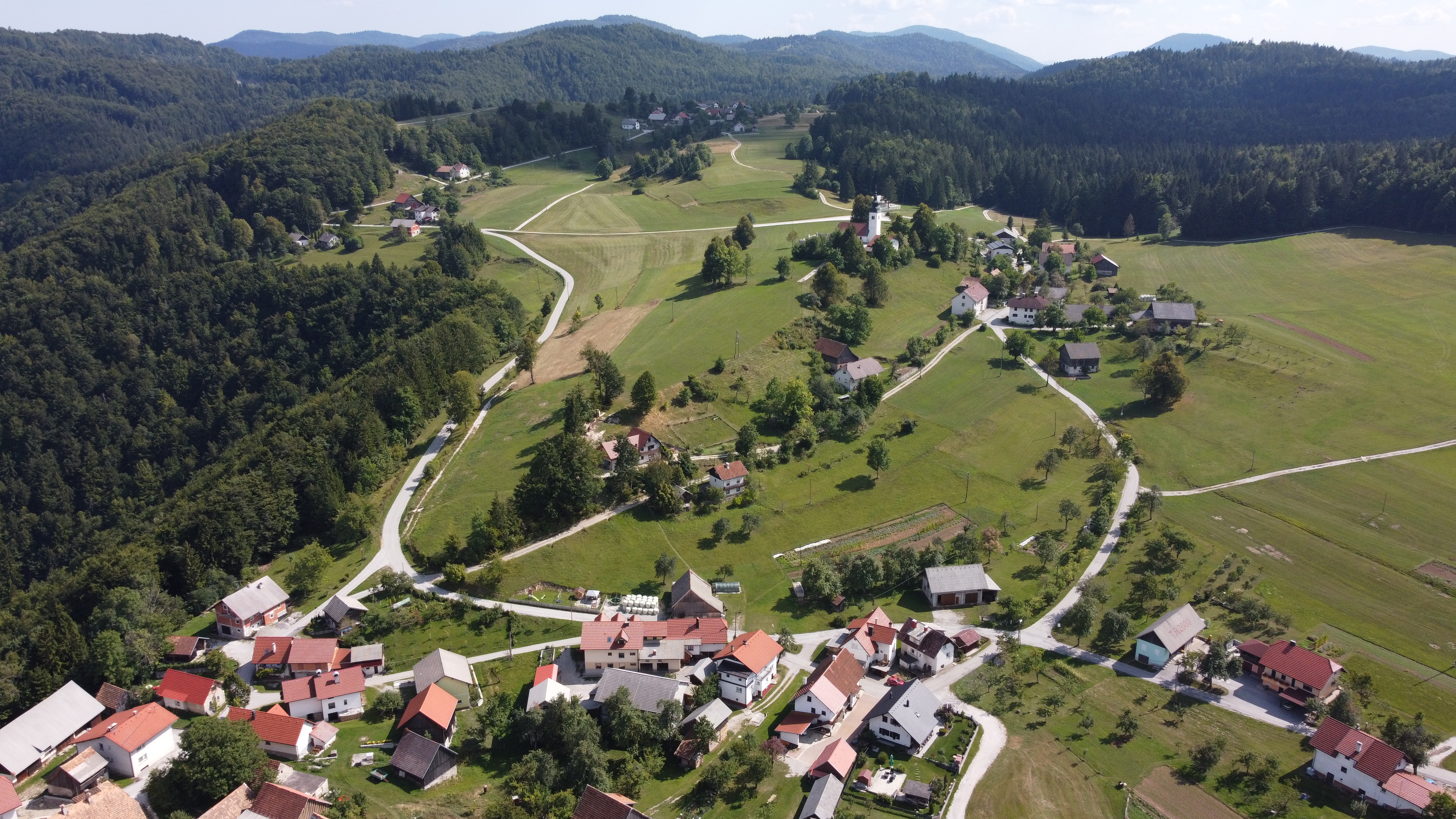

- Location in Slovenia
- Coordinates: 45°45′1.51″N 14°36′0.92″E
- Country: Slovenia
- Traditional region: Lower Carniola
- Statistical region: Southeast Slovenia
- Municipality: Sodražica

Area
  - Total: 5.56 km^{2} (2.15 sq mi)
- Elevation: 902.3 m (2,960 ft)

Population (2002)
  - Total: 55
- Postal code: 1317

Kržeti (pronounced [kəɾˈʒeːti]) is a village in the hills southwest of Sodražica in southern Slovenia. The area is part of the traditional region of Lower Carniola. The entire Municipality of Sodražica is included in the Southeast Slovenia Statistical Region. Together with the villages of Betonovo, Kračali, Janeži, and Petrinci it comprises the community and Parish of Gora nad Sodražico, also known as Gora.

== Mass graves ==
Kržeti is the site of two known mass graves associated with the Second World War. The Petrinci Commons 1 Mass Grave (Slovene: Grobišče Petrinjska gmajna 1) lies in the bottom of a sinkhole about 1 kilometer (0.62 mi) south of Petrinci. It contains the remains of between 120 and 150 members of the Russian Liberation Army that fell during an attack on Ribnica. The Petrinci Commons 2 Mass Grave (Grobišče Petrinjska gmajna 2) is located at the edge of the woods next to the first grave. It contains the remains of an undetermined number of civilians.
