= Brlog =

Brlog may refer to:

== People ==
- Paul Puhallo von Brlog (1856–1926), Croatian Austro-Hungarian general

== Places ==
- Brlog, Serbia, a village in the municipality of Pirot
- Brlog, Krško, a settlement in the Municipality of Krško in Slovenia
- Brlog, Otočac, a village in Otočac municipality in Lika-Senj County, Croatia
- Brlog, Sodražica, a settlement in the Municipality of Sodražica in Slovenia
- Brlog, Velike Lašče, a settlement in the Municipality of Velike Lašče in Slovenia
- Brlog Ozaljski, a village near Kamanje, Croatia
