= Nova Štifta =

Nova Štifta may refer to two different settlements in Slovenia:

- Nova Štifta, Gornji Grad, a village in the Municipality of Gornji Grad, northern Slovenia
- Nova Štifta, Sodražica, a village in the Municipality of Sodražica, southern Slovenia
