= Travna Gora =

- Location in Slovenia
- Coordinates: 45°44′35.81″N 14°38′42.57″E
- Country: Slovenia
- Traditional region: Lower Carniola
- Statistical region: Southeast Slovenia
- Municipality: Sodražica

Area
  - Total: 0.82 km^{2} (0.32 sq mi)
- Elevation: 891.5 m (2,925 ft)

Population (2002)
  - Total: 0
- Postal code: 1317

Travna Gora (pronounced [ˈtɾaːu̯na ˈɡɔːɾa]) is a settlement in the hills south of Sodražica in southern Slovenia. It no longer has any permanent residents, but a number of small vacation houses are regularly used. The area is part of the traditional region of Lower Carniola and is now included in the Southeast Slovenia Statistical Region.

== History ==
Travna Gora was administratively separated from Ravni Dol in 1998 and made an independent settlement.
