= Hrvatini =

Village in Littoral, Slovenia

Hrvatini Crevatini
- Location in Slovenia
- Coordinates: 45°34′56″N 13°45′22″E
- Country: Slovenia
- Traditional region: Littoral
- Statistical region: Coastal–Karst
- Municipality: Koper

Area
  - Total: 1.54 km^{2} (0.59 sq mi)
- Elevation: 169.4 m (556 ft)

Population (2002)
  - Total: 1,126

Hrvatini (pronounced [xəɾʋaˈtiːni]; Italian: Crevatini) is a village in southwestern Slovenia in the City Municipality of Koper.

== Name ==
Hrvatini was mentioned in historical sources as Cruatine in 1763–87. The name is a plural form of what was originally a nickname and has now become a surname, borrowed from old Croatian Hrvatin 'Croat'. For similar names, compare Hrovača and Hrobači (a hamlet of Dobravlje). The name originally referred to medieval Croatian resettlement from the south connected with Ottoman occupation of the central Balkans.

== History ==
For centuries Hrvatini belonged to the municipality of Muggia (now in Italy). After the dissolution of the Free Territory of Trieste in 1954, it was annexed to the Socialist Federal Republic of Yugoslavia. Since then, it has been gravitating towards Koper. During Slovenia's war of independence in 1991, a maritime landing near Hrvatini by special forces of the Yugoslav Army was repulsed by Slovenian troops.

Slovene, Italian, and Croatian are traditionally spoken in the village. There is complete Slovene-Italian official bilingualism.
