= Ivanka Škrabec Novak =

Slovenian teacher, martyr and Servant of God (1915–1942)

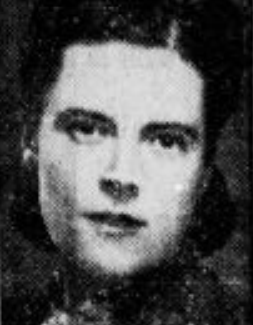
- Ivanka Škrabec Novak around 1941
- Born: Ivanka Škrabec; 17 March 1915; Hrovača, Austria-Hungary
- Died: 4 June 1942 (aged 27); Zamostec, Axis-occupied Yugoslavia
- Occupation: Teacher
- Notable work: The Letter to Unborn Child
- Title: Servant of God

Ivanka Škrabec Novak (17 March 1915 – 4 June 1942) was a Slovenian teacher. She was martyred by Communists while six months pregnant because of her devout Catholic faith and opposition to Communism. She is currently in process of beatification by the Episcopal Conference of Slovenia. Her current title is Servant of God.

== Early life ==
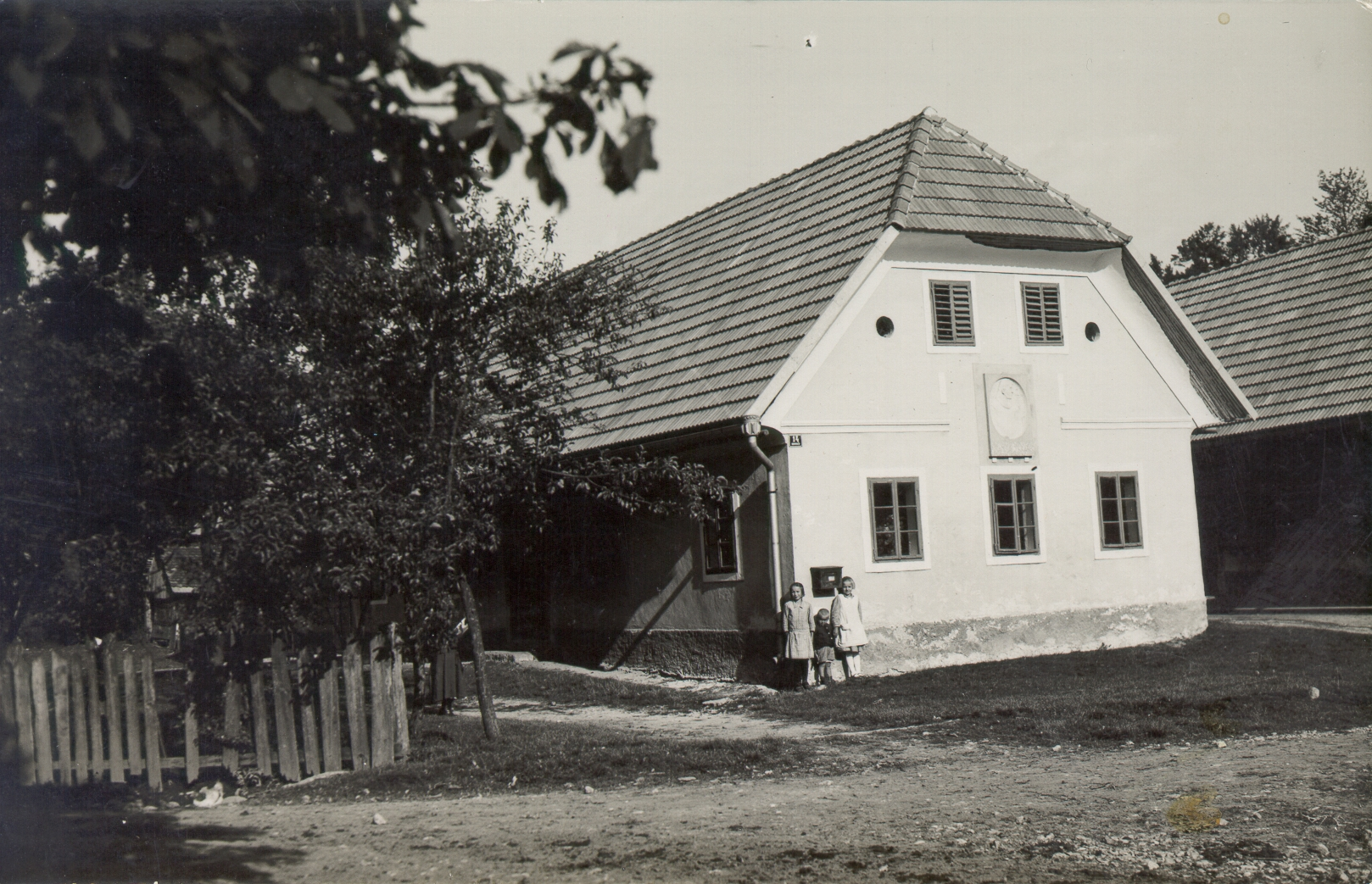
"Škrabčeva domačija", the birthhouse of Ivanka Škrabec Novak in 1940.

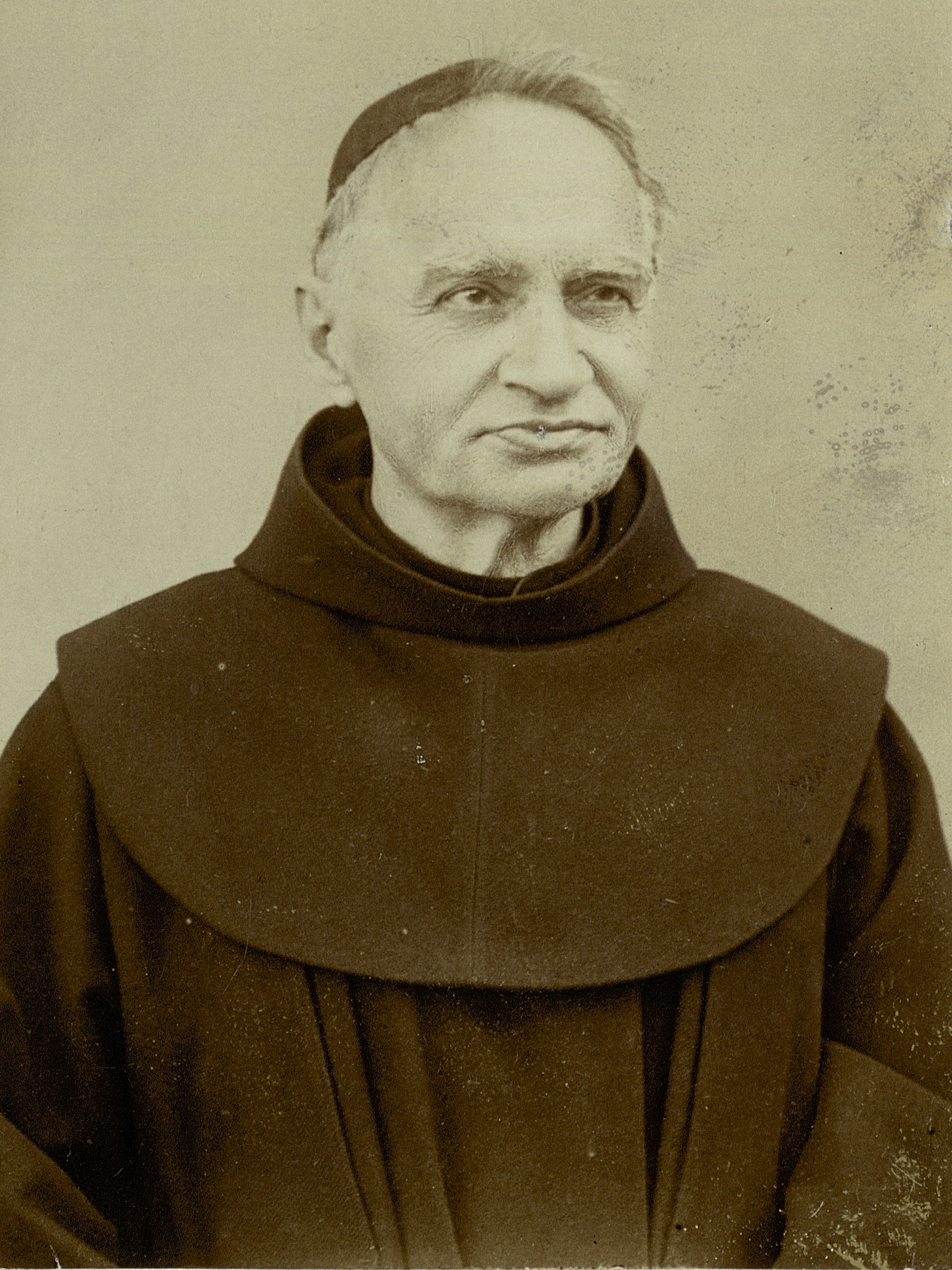
Ivanka's great-uncle Stanislav Škrabec (1844–1918), Slovenian linguist.

Ivanka was born in a devout Catholic Slovenian family on 17 March 1915, in Hrovača. Her mother was farmer Angela Arko, and her father was farmer Janez Škrabec, nephew of linguist Stanislav Škrabec. She had eleven brothers and sisters. After primary school she started studying at Ursuline teacher training college in Ljubljana, where she graduated in 1936.

== Work ==
In 1936 Ivanka moved to Pišece and started working as a teacher in primary school there. She was employed there for three years. In autumn of 1939 she moved to Sodražica and started working as a teacher at primary school there, where she remained employed until her death. She soon become active in Sodražica parish and in cultural life in the town.

In 1941 Slovenia was occupied by Italy and Germany. Already poor residents of Sodražica become even more impoverished. Ivanka tried to help the poor students in her classes as much as she could. She gave money to their families, bought lunches for kids who didn't have them, and visited them if they were sick.

At that time she met France Novak, a chemistry teacher and a devout Catholic, who had fled Nazi-occupied Upper Carniola. She married him in early December in Ljubljana. The young couple settled in Sodražica, where Ivanka continued her work of a teacher.

The couple's outspoken Catholic beliefs and criticism of the Communist-led Liberation Front (OF) and Ivanka's influence on the children made them targets of Communists.

== Kidnapping and murder ==
In the morning of May 28, 1942, following the withdrawal of Italian forces, Communist Partisans entered Sodražica. Ivanka's husband managed to escape, but Ivanka, six months pregnant, was arrested in the afternoon. She was publicly interrogated and humiliated by partisans in the town square. After that she was placed under house arrest.

In the evening of June 3, 1942, Partisans entered the house, where Ivanka was renting an apartment, and found Ivanka there praying the rosary with the landlord and his family. The partisans then took her to her apartment, and forcibly prevented the landlord and his family from helping her in any way. Loud noise of breaking pottery and furniture, insults and beatings were heard from the apartment. After midnight, the partisans took Ivanka away with them, and threatened the landlord not to tell anyone about the events of that night. Her apartment was left in complete devastation, with blood stains on the walls, and some of her clothes were stolen.

Partisans led her to a forest above Jagerbirt in the nearby village of Zamostec. There, she was compelled to dig her own grave. She begged them to spare her until she gives birth, so that her unborn child might live. Despite her pleas they killed her by smashing her skull with a stake in the morning of 4 July, because, as the commander said, "a bullet is a waste for such a woman, bullets will be needed for others". They covered her body with her leather coat and buried her in the shallow grave she was forced to dig. It was the morning of the feast of Corpus Christi.

== Discovery of her body and burial ==
In summer of 1942, a passerby saw a piece of leather sticking from the earth in the forest near Zamostec. He dug around it and soon found a woman's body covered with the leather coat. As the word about that spread around the surrounding villages, people realised that the body belonged to Ivanka, because no other women nearby owned a leather coat.

In August 1942 the partisans had awithdrawn from Sodražica and their place had been reoccupied by the Italians. Ivanka's mother Angela Arko, sister Neža Škrabec, and Angela's neighbor went to Sodražica. All three confirmed that the woman buried in the forest above Zamostec was indeed the teacher Ivanka Škrabec Novak. They took her remains in her birth village. Ivanka was buried in her family grave in Hrovača on August 8, 1942. The funeral was attended by many locals as well as people from Sodražica.

== Letter to an Unborn Child ==
During the excavation of Ivanka's body, a pen and a half-decayed letter were also found in her coat. The letter, in which Ivanka addresses her unborn child, was apparently written just a few hours before her death. The contents of the letter were first published in November 1993 by the magazine Duhovno življenje (Spiritual Life), and later reprinted by Ameriška domovina (American Homeland). The contents were also printed in Jože Dežman's book Moč preživetja (The strength of Survival), book Zamolčane žrtve 2. svetne vojne 1941-1945 v paršuje Krka, Šmihel in Zagradec (The silenced victims of World War II 1941-1945 in the parishes of Krka, Šmihel and Zagradec) by Milan Muhič and book Kalvarija notranjske dežele (Calvary of the Inner Carniola) by Maks Ipavec.

The last part of the letter says: "Look, my child, the morning is already approaching. The first dawn from behind the mountains announces it... for us the last morning of suffering. The morning will rise again - but without suffering and tears... rising with God... Just sleep peacefully, for your mother watches over you... Look, the red dawn already announces that the day is awakening... and the last stars are going out in it... The clock in the tower is already announcing the morning... which will take us on our last journey... I will not be alone... you will be with me, my child... and Mary - as she did with her Son on Calvary, will go with us... In the last, final breaths, she will stand by us... and she will carry us to an eternally happy home. No one will ever again spoil this happiness for us... for we will be immersed in the eternal God... in the eternal peace of God... My child, just sleep... Mary is with us... Look... they are coming... they are coming...".

== Servant of God ==
Ivanka is currently undergoing a process for recognition of martyrdom and sainthood within the framework of the joint process of Slovenian Martyrs of the 20th century, which was officially opened by the Episcopal Conference of Slovenia on 28 October 2002. Her current title is Servant of God.
