= Novi Pot =

- Location in Slovenia
- Coordinates: 45°47′15.54″N 14°34′8.38″E
- Country: Slovenia
- Traditional region: Lower Carniola
- Statistical region: Southeast Slovenia
- Municipality: Sodražica

Area
  - Total: 2.07 km^{2} (0.80 sq mi)
- Elevation: 774.2 m (2,540 ft)

Population (2002)
  - Total: 10
- Postal code: 1317

Novi Pot (pronounced [ˈnɔːʋi ˈpoːt]) is a small remote settlement in the hills northwest of Sodražica in southern Slovenia. The area is part of the traditional region of Lower Carniola and is now included in the Southeast Slovenia Statistical Region.
