= Male Vinice =

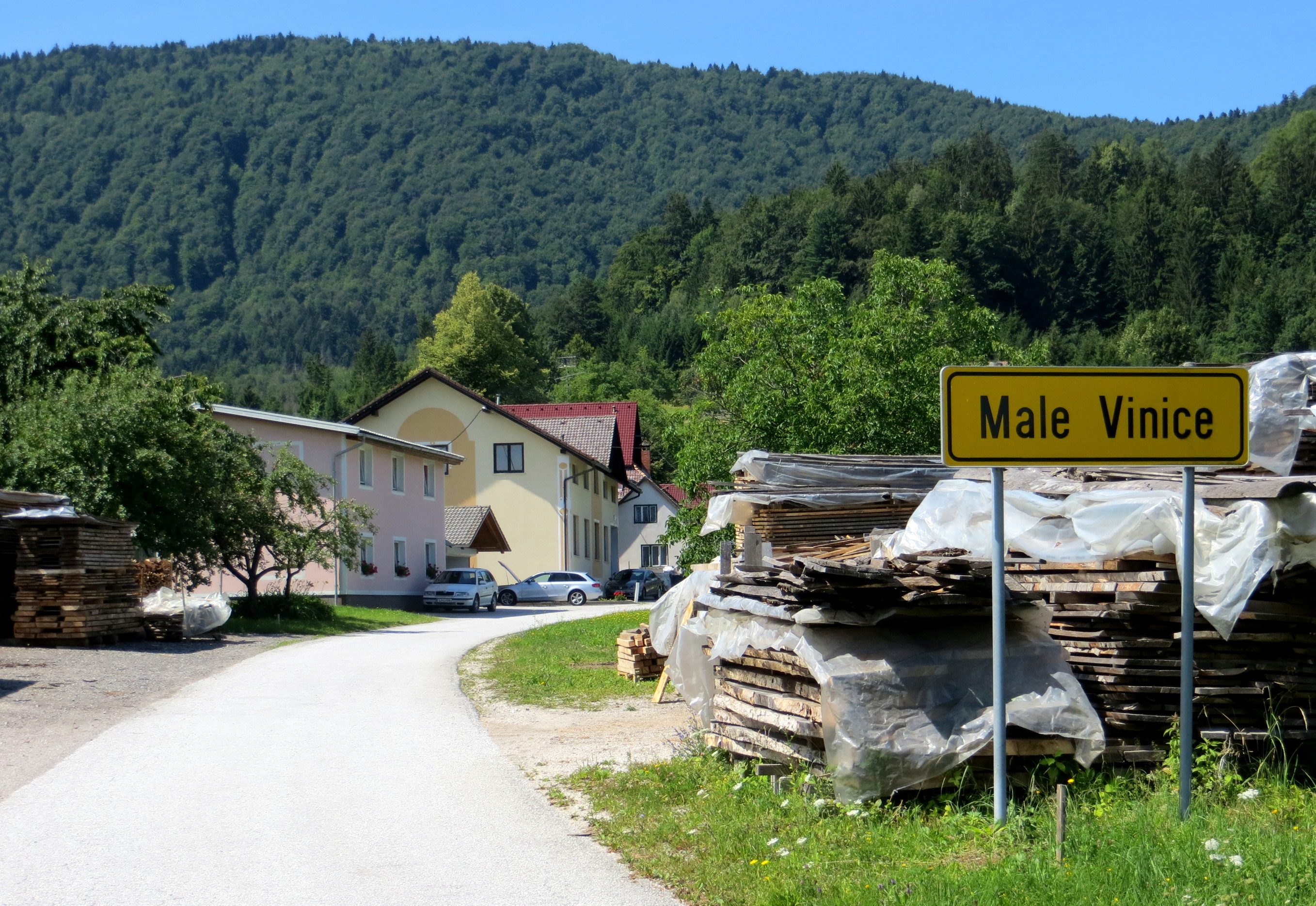

- Location in Slovenia
- Coordinates: 45°44′46.43″N 14°40′9.94″E
- Country: Slovenia
- Traditional region: Lower Carniola
- Statistical region: Southeast Slovenia
- Municipality: Sodražica

Area
  - Total: 0.09 km^{2} (0.035 sq mi)
- Elevation: 535.2 m (1,756 ft)

Population (2002)
  - Total: 16
- Postal code: 1317

Male Vinice (pronounced [ˈmaːlɛ ˈʋiːnitsɛ]) is a small settlement in the Municipality of Sodražica in southern Slovenia. The area is part of Lower Carniola and is included in the Southeast Slovenia Statistical Region.

== History ==
Male Vinice was administratively separated from Vinice in 1998 and made an independent settlement.
