= Zamostec =

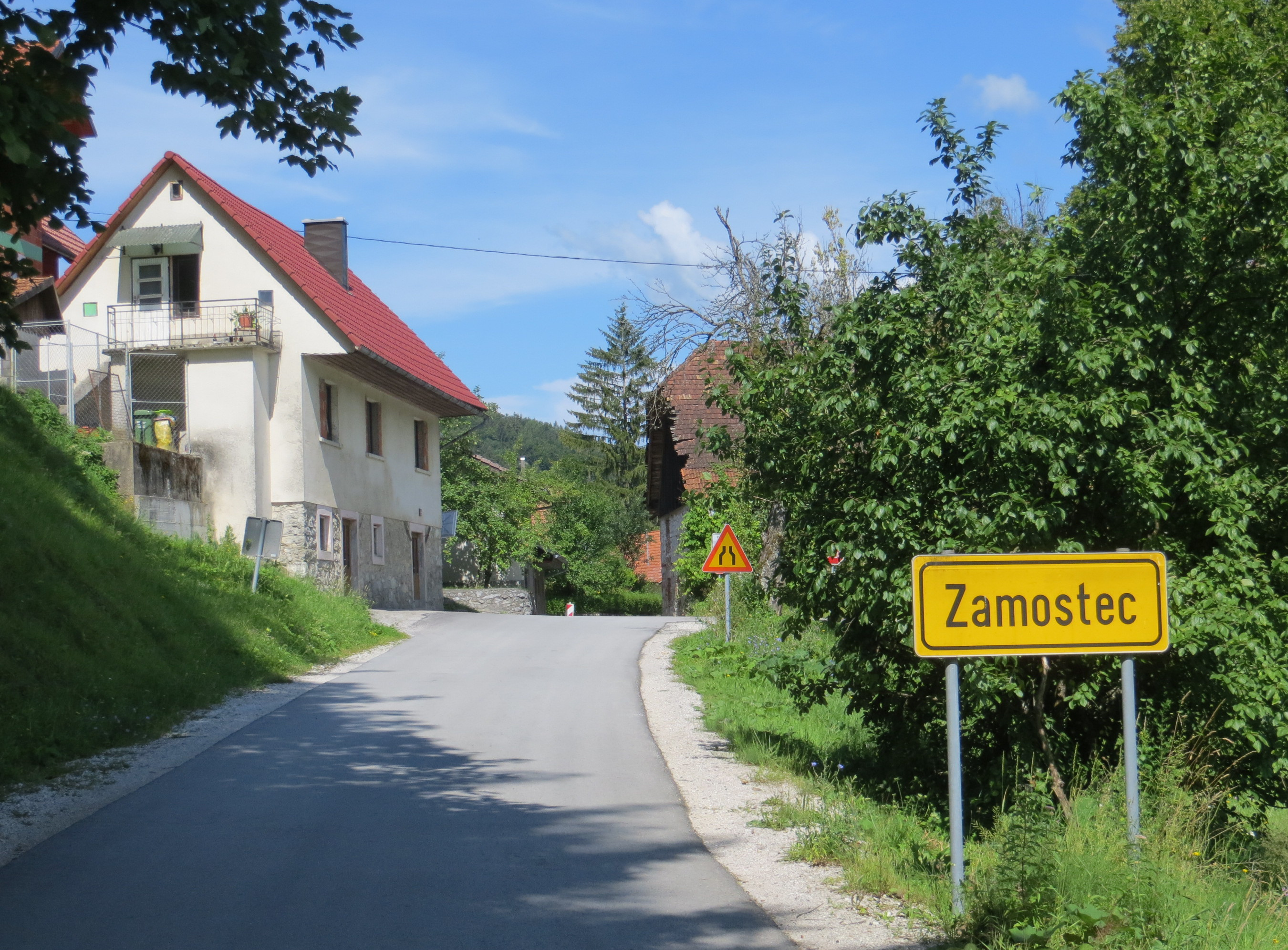

- Location in Slovenia
- Coordinates: 45°45′25.76″N 14°38′53.4″E
- Country: Slovenia
- Traditional region: Lower Carniola
- Statistical region: Southeast Slovenia
- Municipality: Sodražica

Area
  - Total: 4.46 km^{2} (1.72 sq mi)
- Elevation: 530.1 m (1,739 ft)

Population (2002)
  - Total: 209
- Postal code: 1317

Zamostec (pronounced [zaˈmoːstəts] or [zamɔˈstəts]; German: Brückel) is a settlement east of Sodražica in southern Slovenia. The area is part of the traditional region of Lower Carniola and is now included in the Southeast Slovenia Statistical Region. The settlement includes the hamlets of Vranove Njivice, Podgora, Mandrge, Podvas, Grdi Dol (German: Gerdido), and Bravčji Vrt.

== Name ==
Zamostec was attested in historical sources as Pruͤklein in 1343 and Prukchlein in 1444, among other spellings.

== Cultural heritage ==
A small chapel-shrine in the village is dedicated to the Our Lady of the Snows. It was built in the late 19th century.

== Notable people ==
- Ivanka Škrabec Novak (1915–1942), teacher and martyr, killed in Zamostec on June 4, 1942
