= Preska, Sodražica =

Preska
- Location in Slovenia
- Coordinates: 45°46′20.24″N 14°39′24.49″E
- Country: Slovenia
- Traditional region: Lower Carniola
- Statistical region: Southeast Slovenia
- Municipality: Sodražica

Area
  - Total: 0.61 km^{2} (0.24 sq mi)
- Elevation: 686.4 m (2,252 ft)

Population (2002)
  - Total: 0
- Postal code: 1316

Preska (pronounced [ˈpɾeːska]) is a small settlement in the hills northeast of Sodražica in southern Slovenia. It no longer has any permanent residents. The area is part of the traditional region of Lower Carniola and is now included in the Southeast Slovenia Statistical Region.

== Name ==
The name Preska is derived from the noun preseka 'forest clearing', referring to land that was cleared for settlement.
