= Kotel, Sodražica =

Kotel
- Location in Slovenia
- Coordinates: 45°47′2.39″N 14°33′17.09″E
- Country: Slovenia
- Traditional region: Lower Carniola
- Statistical region: Southeast Slovenia
- Municipality: Sodražica

Area
  - Total: 0.65 km^{2} (0.25 sq mi)
- Elevation: 769.7 m (2,525 ft)

Population (2002)
  - Total: 0
- Postal code: 1385

Kotel (pronounced [ˈkɔːtɛu̯]) is a remote settlement in the hills west of Sodražica in southern Slovenia. It no longer has any permanent residents. The area is part of the traditional region of Lower Carniola and is now included in the Southeast Slovenia Statistical Region.
