= Globel =

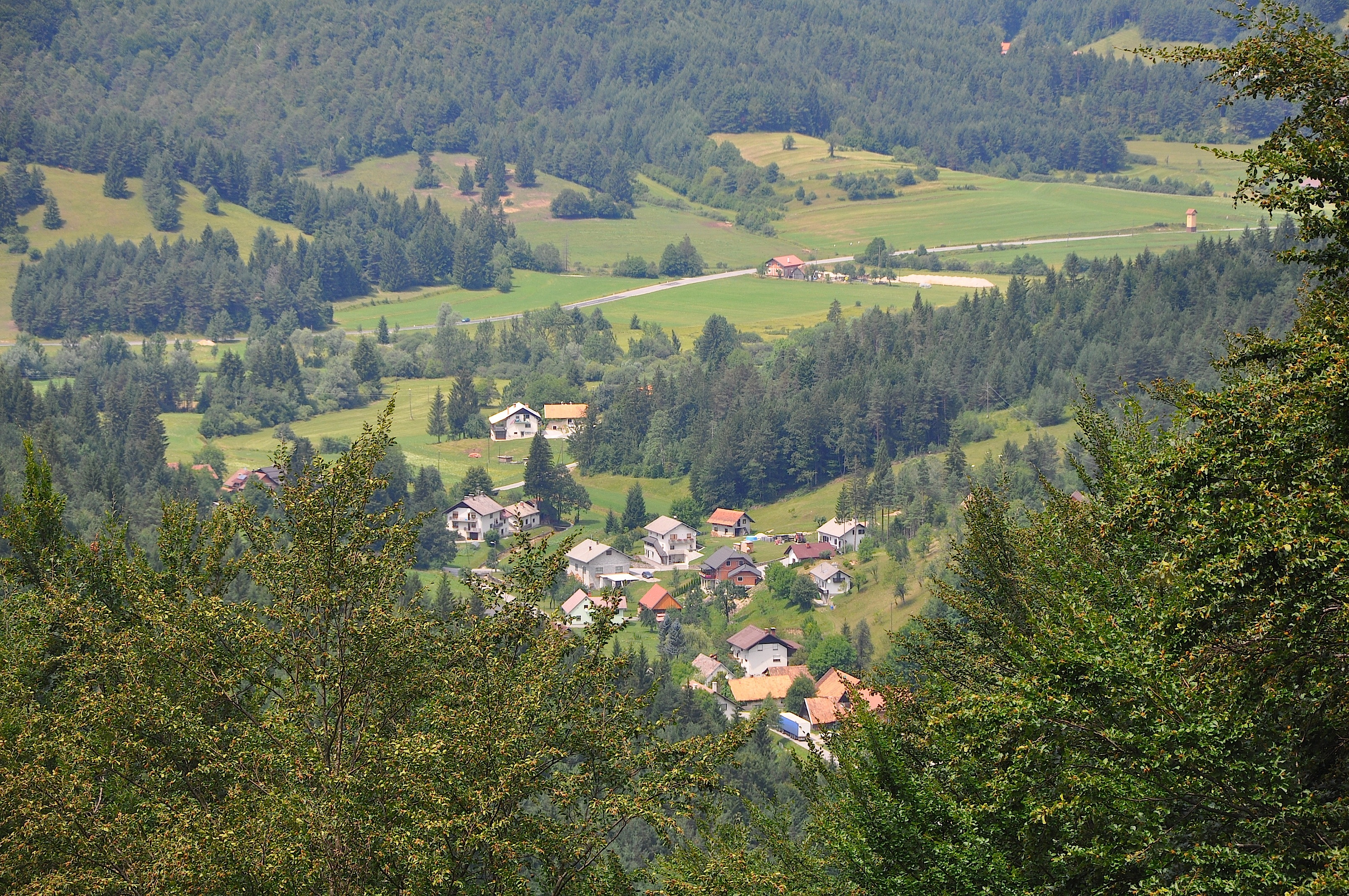

- Location in Slovenia
- Coordinates: 45°45′50.76″N 14°36′1.96″E
- Country: Slovenia
- Traditional region: Lower Carniola
- Statistical region: Southeast Slovenia
- Municipality: Sodražica

Area
  - Total: 2.37 km^{2} (0.92 sq mi)
- Elevation: 577.5 m (1,895 ft)

Population (2002)
  - Total: 108
- Postal code: 1317

Globel (pronounced [ɡlɔˈbeːu̯] or [ˈɡloːbɛu̯]) is a settlement in the Municipality of Sodražica in southern Slovenia, located west of the main town of Sodražica. The area is part of the traditional region of Lower Carniola and is now included in the Southeast Slovenia Statistical Region.

The local church, built on the eastern outskirts of the village, is dedicated to the Holy Family and belongs to the Parish of Sodražica. It was built in 1908 in the Neoclassical style.
