= Zapotok, Sodražica =

Zapotok
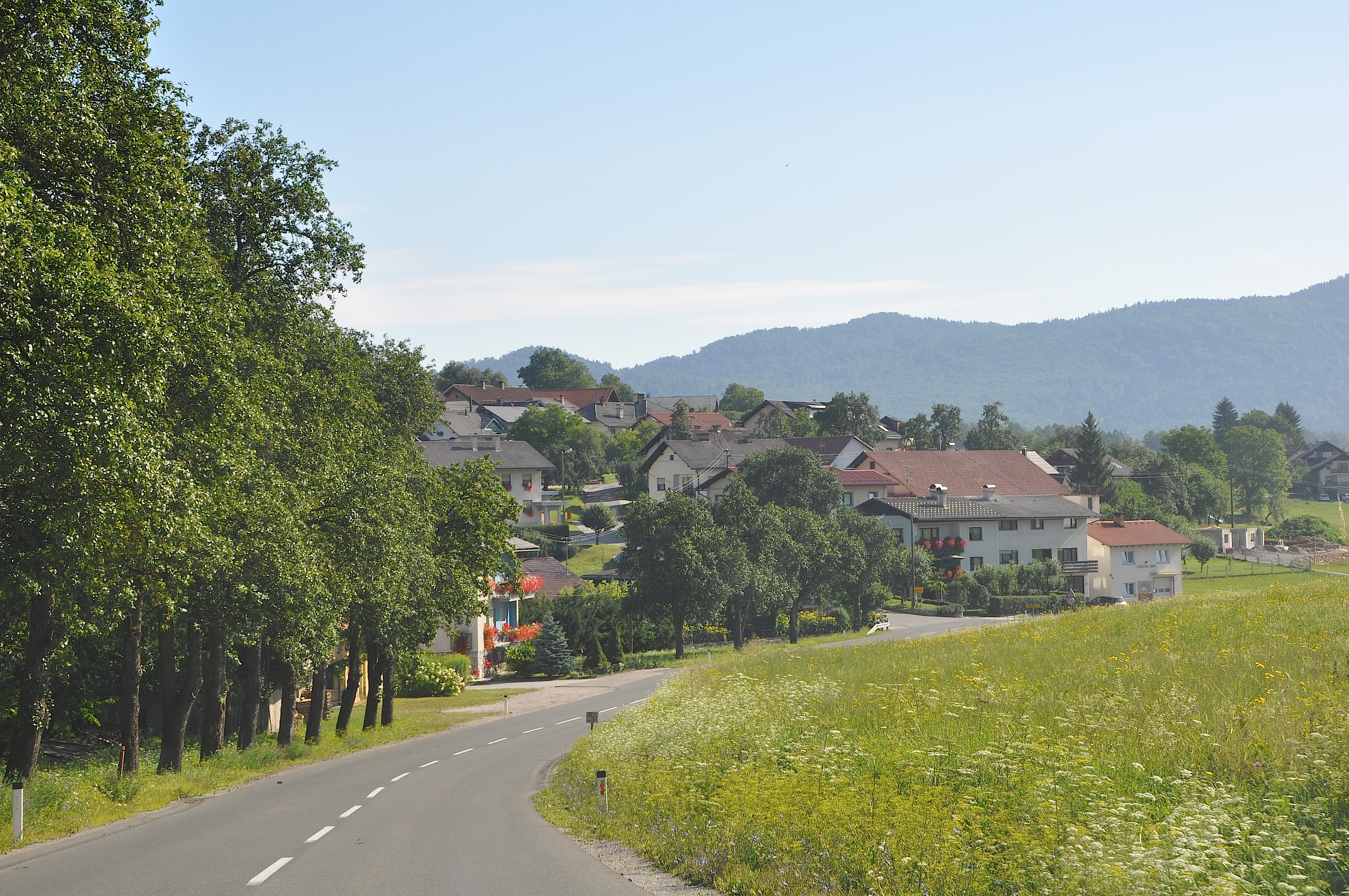

- Location in Slovenia
- Coordinates: 45°45′43.53″N 14°40′38.77″E
- Country: Slovenia
- Traditional region: Lower Carniola
- Statistical region: Southeast Slovenia
- Municipality: Sodražica

Area
  - Total: 0.79 km^{2} (0.31 sq mi)
- Elevation: 562.6 m (1,846 ft)

Population (2002)
  - Total: 192
- Postal code: 1310

Zapotok (pronounced [zaˈpɔːtɔk]) is a settlement in the Municipality of Sodražica in southern Slovenia. The area is part of the traditional region of Lower Carniola and is now included in the Southeast Slovenia Statistical Region. It includes the hamlets of Mali Zapotok, Veliki Zapotok, and Sveti Marko.

== History ==
In the land registry of 1573, the Dominion of Ribnica possessed two farms in Mali Zapotok and one farm in Veliki Potok. A water main was installed in the village in 1903 connected to a catchwater at Ograda Spring above Lipovšica. During the Second World War, there were engagements between Partisan and Italian forces in June and July 1942.

Zapotok annexed the formerly independent settlements of Mali Zapotok and Veliki Zapotok on 19 April 1952, ending their existence as separate settlements.

== Church ==
The local church is dedicated to Saint Mark and belongs to the Parish of Sodražica. Its nave dates to the Middle Ages. It was extended in the 18th century. Its stone paving dates from 1773. It formerly had a flat wooden ceiling; this was removed in 1865 and the nave was vaulted. The church's statue of Saint John is a work by Anton Miklič, and the main altar bears the signature of Anton Sajz, dated 1865. The two pseudo-Renaissance side altars date from the 19th century. According to folk tradition, a pagan temple once stood at the site of the church.

== Notable people ==
Notable people that were born or lived in Zapotok include:

- Mihael Arko (1857–1938), dean in Idrija, historian, and provincial representative
- Matija Mrače (1866–1903), translator
