= Sinovica =

- Location in Slovenia
- Coordinates: 45°46′6.05″N 14°39′44.02″E
- Country: Slovenia
- Traditional region: Lower Carniola
- Statistical region: Southeast Slovenia
- Municipality: Sodražica

Area
  - Total: 1.27 km^{2} (0.49 sq mi)
- Elevation: 735 m (2,411 ft)

Population (2002)
  - Total: 14
- Postal code: 1316

Sinovica (pronounced [ˈsiːnɔʋitsa]; German: Sinowitz) is a small settlement in the hills northeast of Sodražica in southern Slovenia. The village is surrounded by fields and forests. Some of the buildings in the settlement are abandoned. The area is part of the traditional region of Lower Carniola, and it is now included in the Southeast Slovenia Statistical Region.
