= Hrovača =

- Location in Slovenia
- Coordinates: 45°44′13.7″N 14°44′13″E
- Country: Slovenia
- Traditional region: Lower Carniola
- Statistical region: Southeast Slovenia
- Municipality: Ribnica

Area
  - Total: 6.51 km^{2} (2.51 sq mi)
- Elevation: 490.1 m (1,608 ft)

Population (2002)
  - Total: 198
- Postal code: 1310

Hrovača (pronounced [xɾɔˈʋaːtʃa]; German: Krobatsch) is a settlement immediately to the southeast of the town of Ribnica in southern Slovenia. It lies just south of the town of Ribnica. The area is part of the traditional region of Lower Carniola and is now included in the Southeast Slovenia Statistical Region.

== Name ==
The name Hrovača is derived from the word Hrvat 'Croat'. Like similar names (e.g., Hrvatini and Hrobači, a hamlet of Dobravlje), it originally referred to medieval Croatian resettlement from the south connected with Ottoman occupation of the central Balkans. In the past the German name was Krobatsch.

== Mass grave ==
Hrovača is the site of a mass grave associated with the Second World War. The Bašelj Shaft 2 Mass Grave (Slovene: Grobišče Brezno na Bašlju 2) is located in the woods northeast of Hrovača, about 2 kilometers (1.2 mi) south of Podtabor, on the north slope of Chicken Hill (Kurji grič). Spelunkers have reported human remains at the site.

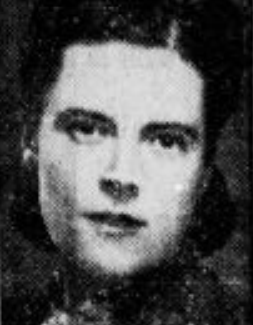
Teacher and martyr Ivanka Škrabec Novak (1915–1942)

== Church ==
The local church, built next to the cemetery on the southern outskirts of the settlement, is dedicated to the Holy Trinity (Slovene: sveta Trojica) and belongs to the parish of Ribnica. It was built in 1909 on the site of a 16th-century church originally dedicated to Saint James.

== Notable people ==
- Ivanka Škrabec Novak (1915–1942), teacher and martyr, born and spent her childhood in Hrovača
