= Jelovec, Sodražica =

Jelovec
- Location in Slovenia
- Coordinates: 45°45′47.99″N 14°36′44.09″E
- Country: Slovenia
- Traditional region: Lower Carniola
- Statistical region: Southeast Slovenia
- Municipality: Sodražica

Area
  - Total: 1.7 km^{2} (0.66 sq mi)
- Elevation: 575.5 m (1,888 ft)

Population (2002)
  - Total: 47
- Postal code: 1317

Jelovec (pronounced [jɛˈlɔːʋəts] or [jɛˈloːʋəts]; German: Jelowitz) is a settlement immediately west of Sodražica in southern Slovenia. The entire Municipality of Sodražica is part of the traditional region of Lower Carniola and is included in the Southeast Slovenia Statistical Region.
