= Podklanec, Sodražica =

Podklanec
- Location in Slovenia
- Coordinates: 45°45′59.89″N 14°34′47.84″E
- Country: Slovenia
- Traditional region: Lower Carniola
- Statistical region: Southeast Slovenia
- Municipality: Sodražica

Area
  - Total: 3.76 km^{2} (1.45 sq mi)
- Elevation: 586.5 m (1,924 ft)

Population (2011)
  - Total: 93
- Postal code: 1317

Podklanec (pronounced [pɔtˈklaːnəts]) is a settlement in the Municipality of Sodražica in southern Slovenia. The area was part of the Lower Carniola traditional region and is now included in the Southeast Slovenia Statistical Region.

== History ==
Until the territorial reorganization in Slovenia, it was part of the old municipality of Ribnica.

== Population ==
In the 2011 census, Podklanec had 93 inhabitants.

Number of inhabitants according to censuses
1991	2002	2011
91	100	93
