= Brlog, Velike Lašče =

Brlog
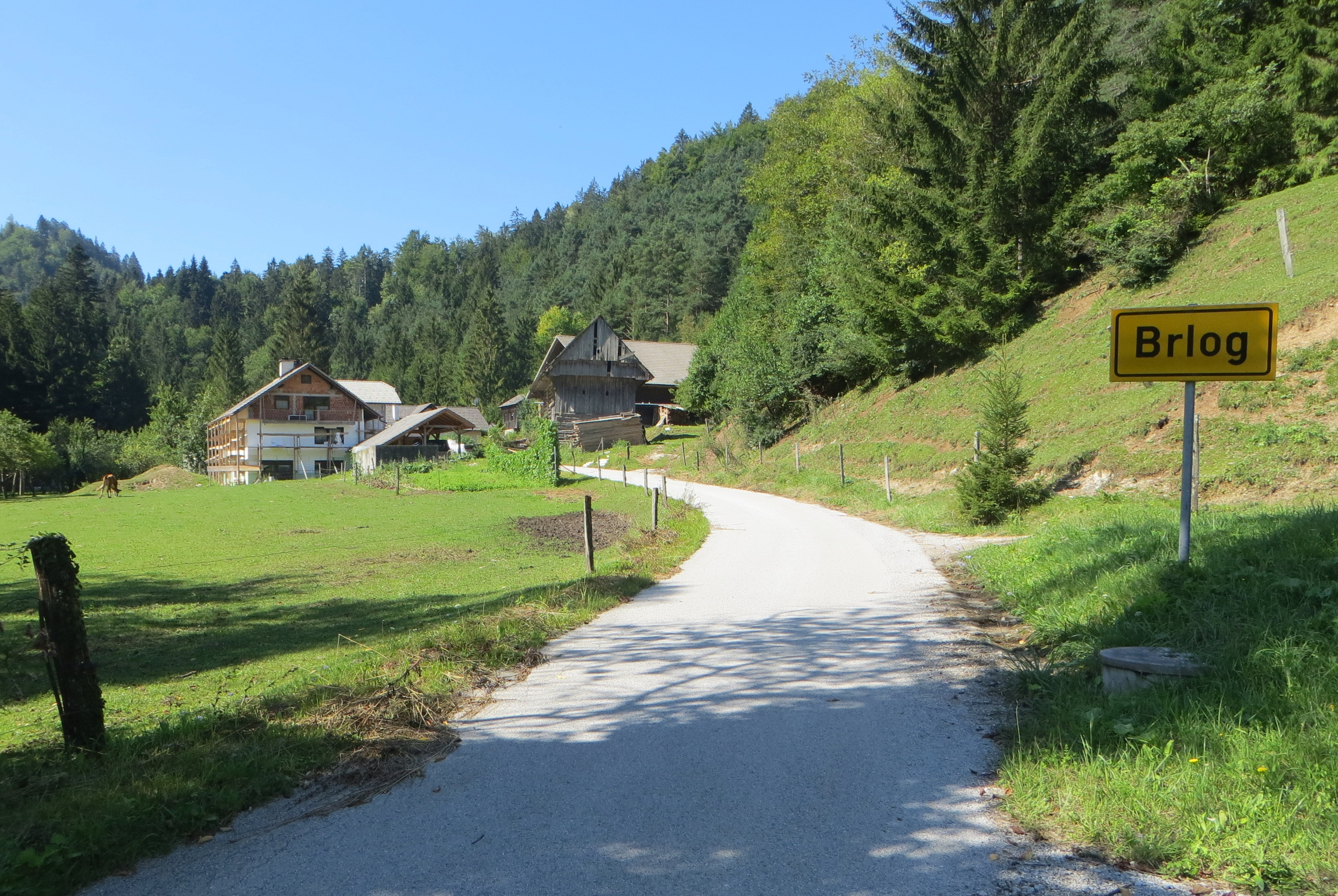

- Location in Slovenia
- Coordinates: 45°47′53.38″N 14°33′53.27″E
- Country: Slovenia
- Traditional region: Lower Carniola
- Statistical region: Central Slovenia
- Municipality: Velike Lašče

Area
  - Total: 0.81 km^{2} (0.31 sq mi)
- Elevation: 580.7 m (1,905 ft)

Population (2015)
  - Total: 6
- Postal code: 1315

Brlog (pronounced [bəɾˈlɔk]; Slovene: Brlog - del) is a small remote settlement in the Municipality of Velike Lašče in Slovenia. A small part of the settlement lies in the neighbouring Municipality of Sodražica. The area is part of the traditional region of Lower Carniola and is now included in the Central Slovenia Statistical Region.

== Name ==
The official Slovenian name of the settlement, Brlog - del, literally means 'part of Brlog'. The part of the settlement in the neighboring Municipality of Sodražica is named identically.
