= Lipovšica =

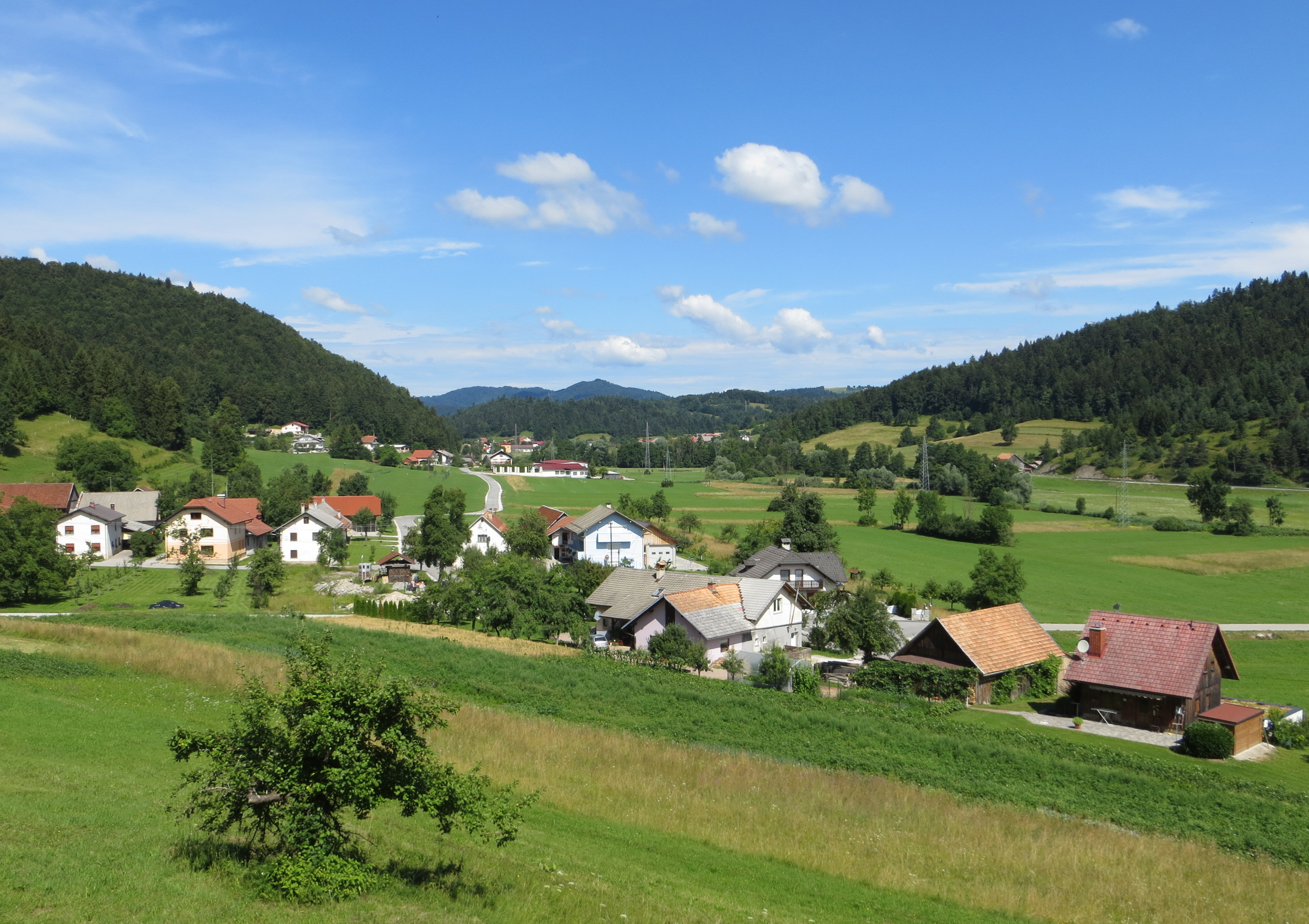

- Location in Slovenia
- Coordinates: 45°44′56.39″N 14°39′39.81″E
- Country: Slovenia
- Traditional region: Lower Carniola
- Statistical region: Southeast Slovenia
- Municipality: Sodražica

Area
  - Total: 0.31 km^{2} (0.12 sq mi)
- Elevation: 527.1 m (1,729 ft)

Population (2002)
  - Total: 45
- Postal code: 1317

Lipovšica (pronounced [liˈpoːu̯ʃitsa]; in older sources also Lipovščica, German: Lipouschitz) is a settlement halfway between Sodražica and Ribnica in southern Slovenia. The area is part of the traditional region of Lower Carniola and is now included in the Southeast Slovenia Statistical Region.
