= Žimarice =

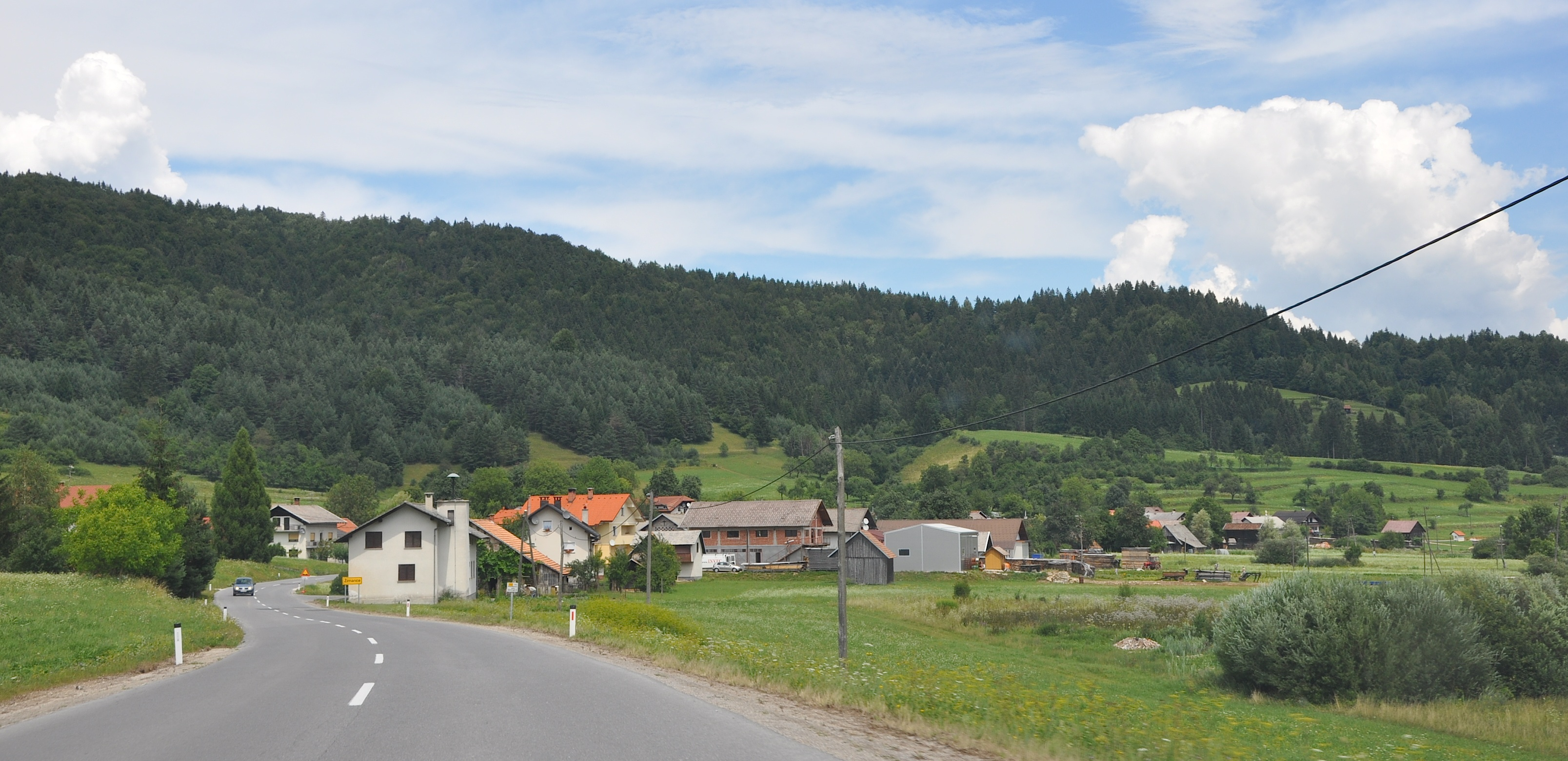

- Location in Slovenia
- Coordinates: 45°46′38.03″N 14°35′57.45″E
- Country: Slovenia
- Traditional region: Lower Carniola
- Statistical region: Southeast Slovenia
- Municipality: Sodražica

Area
  - Total: 5.7 km^{2} (2.2 sq mi)
- Elevation: 560.8 m (1,840 ft)

Population (2002)
  - Total: 249
- Postal code: 1317

Žimarice (pronounced [ˈʒiːmaɾitsɛ]; in older sources also Žigmarice, German: Schigmaritz) is a settlement in the Municipality of Sodražica in southern Slovenia. It is made up of a number of smaller settlement clusters in the valley northwest of Sodražica. The area is part of the traditional region of Lower Carniola and is now included in the Southeast Slovenia Statistical Region.
