= Ravni Dol, Sodražica =

Ravni Dol
- Location in Slovenia
- Coordinates: 45°44′31.83″N 14°40′1.24″E
- Country: Slovenia
- Traditional region: Lower Carniola
- Statistical region: Southeast Slovenia
- Municipality: Sodražica

Area
  - Total: 4.23 km^{2} (1.63 sq mi)
- Elevation: 555.1 m (1,821 ft)

Population (2002)
  - Total: 15
- Postal code: 1317

Ravni Dol (pronounced [ˈɾaːu̯ni ˈdoːu̯]; German: Ebenthal) is a small settlement in the hills west of Ribnica in southern Slovenia. It belongs to the Municipality of Sodražica. The area is part of the traditional region of Lower Carniola and is now included in the Southeast Slovenia Statistical Region.

== Mass graves ==
Ravni Dol is the site of five known mass graves associated with the Second World War. The Travna Gora 1–4 mass graves (Slovene: Grobišče Travna gora 1–4) are located at four sites west of Ravni Dol, directly south of the Travna Gora Lodge (Dom na Travni Gori). The fourth grave is marked by a wooden cross below the road. The first grave is about 50 meters (160 ft) below this, the second grave another 10 meters (33 ft) down, and the third grave 10 meters (33 ft) further. The graves contain the remains of 48 prisoners of war from the prison in Kočevje murdered by the Partisan Šercer Brigade on 2 November 1943 in revenge for the escape of 10 prisoners that killed a guard near Glažuta. The Big Mountain Deep Cave Mass Grave (Grobišče Globoka jama na Veliki gori)—also known as the Shaft 217/218 Mass Grave (Grobišče Brezno 217/218) or Krajc Peak Cave Mass Grave (Grobišče Jama v Krajčjem vrhu)—is located north of Krajc Peak (Krajčev vrh) and about 1.5 kilometers (0.93 mi) south of the Travna Gora Lodge. It contains the remains of Slovenes from Travna Gora.
