= Brlog, Sodražica =

Brlog
- Location in Slovenia
- Coordinates: 45°47′53.38″N 14°33′53.27″E
- Country: Slovenia
- Traditional region: Lower Carniola
- Statistical region: Central Slovenia
- Municipality: Sodražica

Area
  - Total: 0.1 km^{2} (0.039 sq mi)
- Elevation: 650 m (2,130 ft)

Population (2015)
  - Total: 1

Brlog (pronounced [bəɾˈlɔk]; Slovene: Brlog - del) is a small remote settlement in the Municipality of Sodražica in Slovenia. A small part of the settlement lies in the neighboring Municipality of Velike Lašče. The area is part of the traditional region of Lower Carniola and is now included in the Southeast Slovenia Statistical Region.

== Name ==
The official Slovenian name of the settlement, Brlog - del, literally means 'part of Brlog'. The part of the settlement in the neighboring Municipality of Velike Lašče is named identically.
