= Nova Štifta, Sodražica =

Nova Štifta
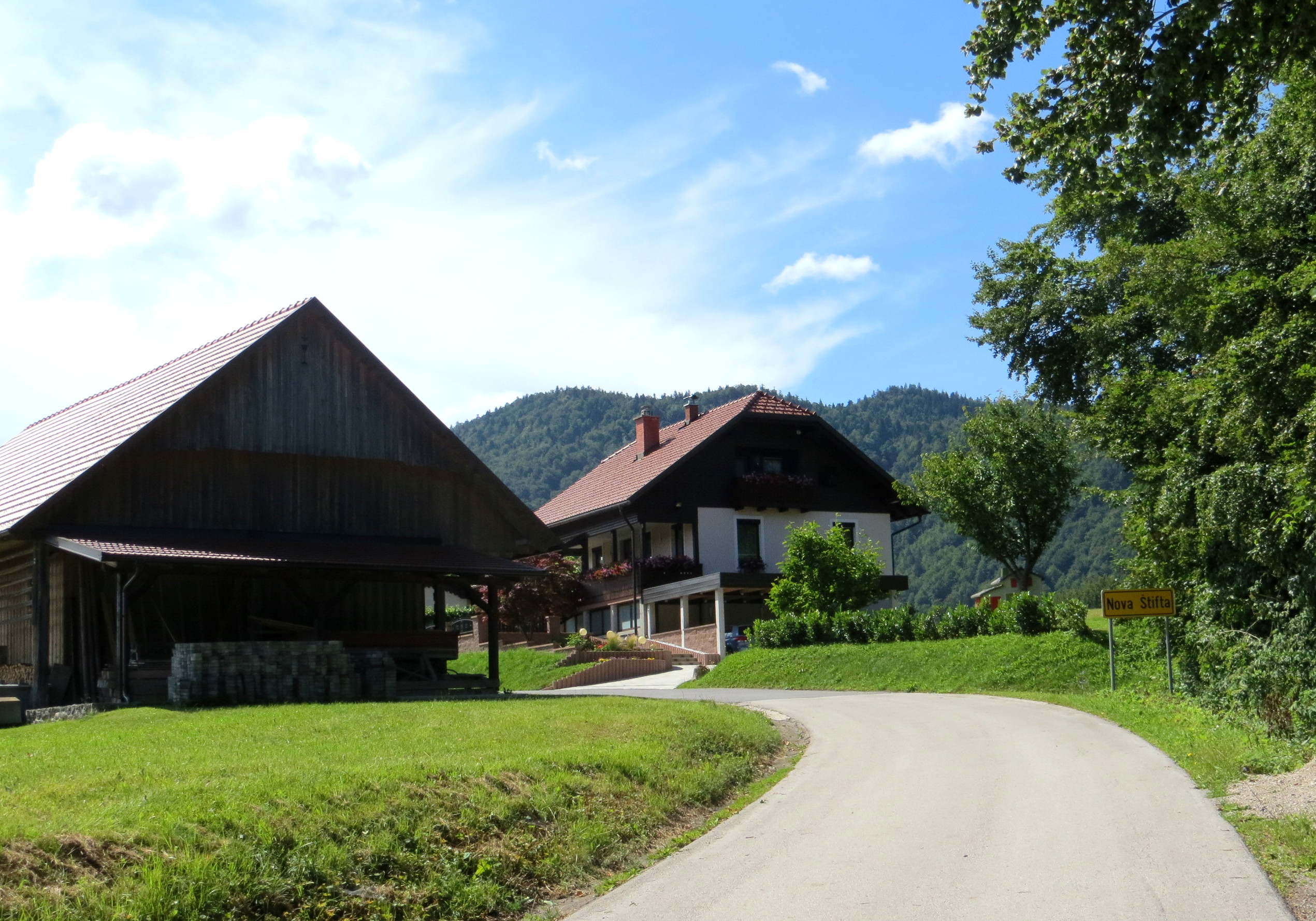

- Location in Slovenia
- Coordinates: 45°44′46.38″N 14°39′50.05″E
- Country: Slovenia
- Traditional region: Lower Carniola
- Statistical region: Southeast Slovenia
- Municipality: Sodražica

Area
  - Total: 0.26 km^{2} (0.10 sq mi)
- Elevation: 614 m (2,014 ft)

Population (2002)
  - Total: 6
- Postal code: 1317

Nova Štifta (pronounced [ˈnɔːʋa ˈʃtiːfta]; German: Neustift) is a small settlement in the Municipality of Sodražica in southern Slovenia. The area is part of the traditional region of Lower Carniola and is now included in the Southeast Slovenia Statistical Region.

== Church ==
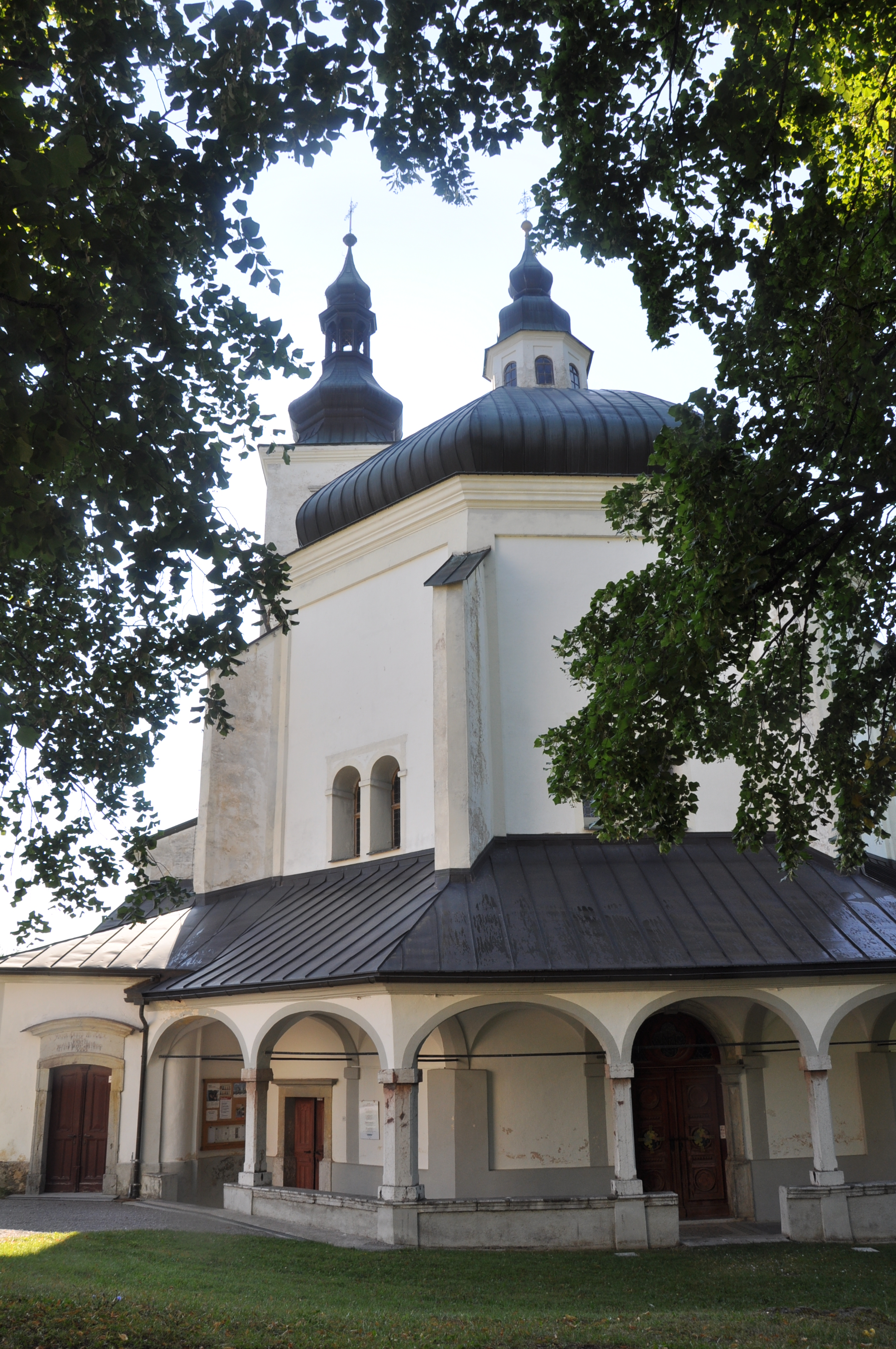
View from north

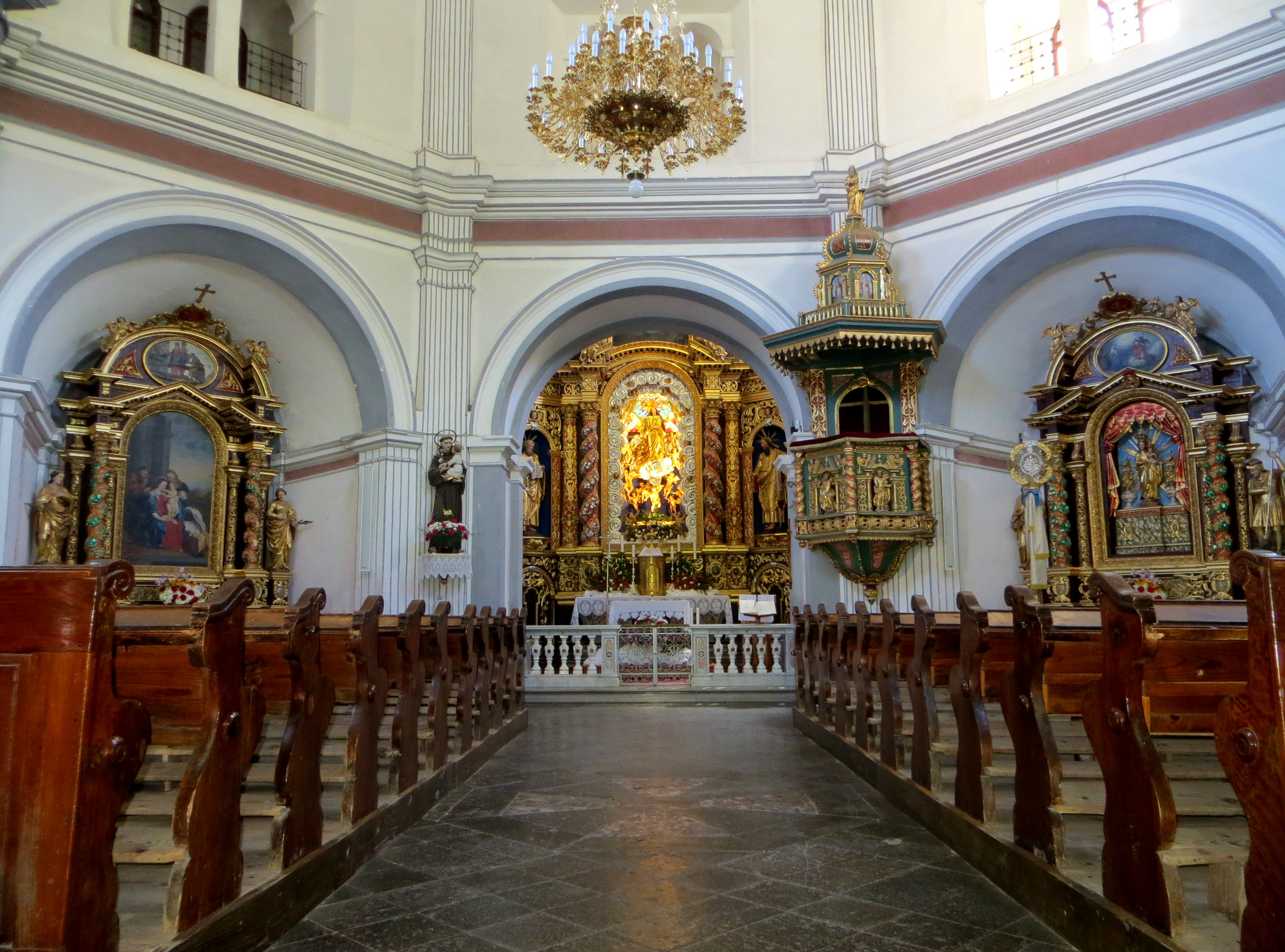
Church interior

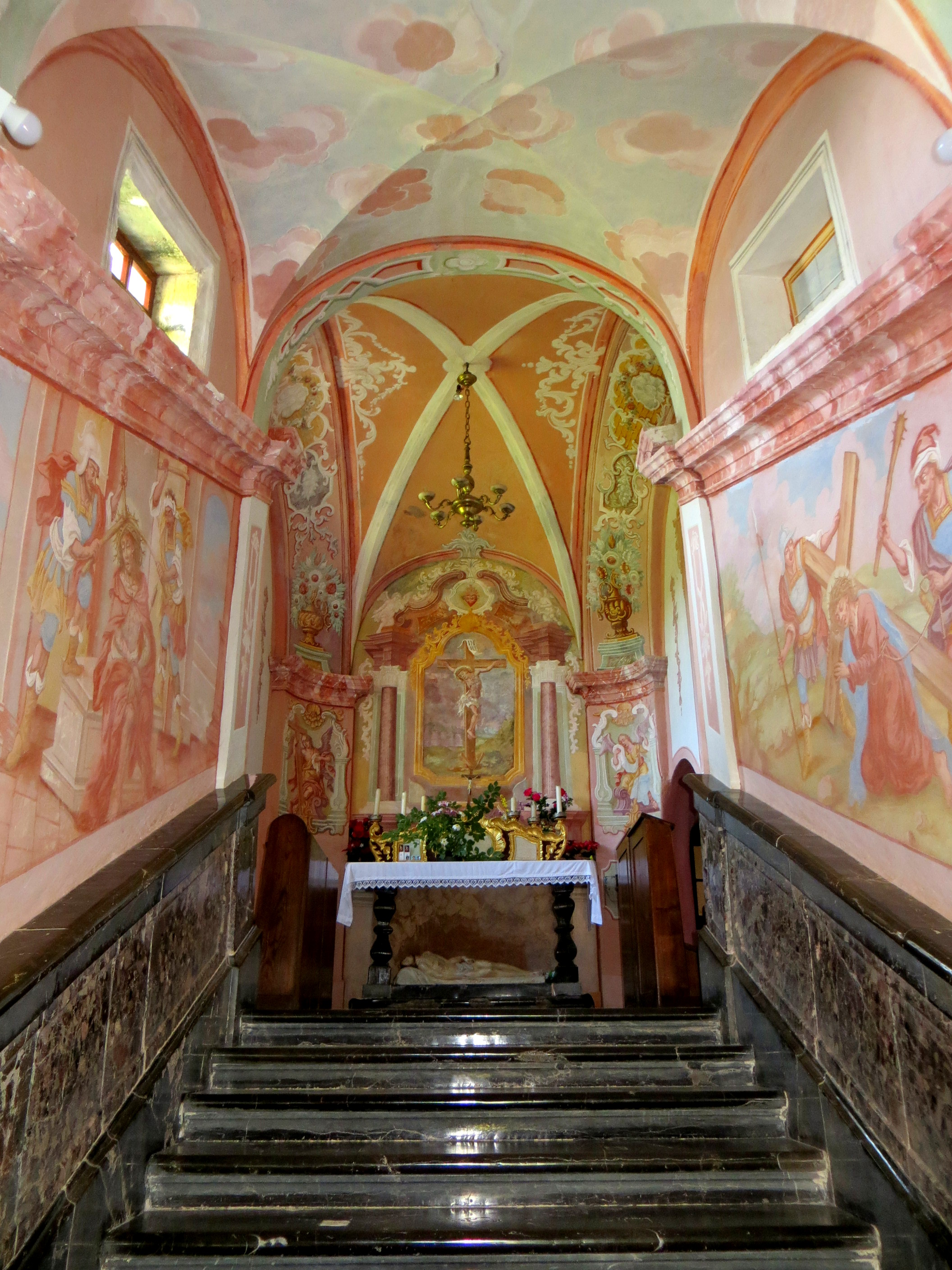
Chapel

Assumption Church

Nova Štifta is best known for its pilgrimage church dedicated to the Assumption of Mary. It is a Baroque church with an exterior arcade. It was built between 1641 and 1671 and was commissioned by the Jurij Khisl, lord of the castle in Ribnica, after a mysterious light appeared at Juniper Hill (Brinov vrh, 622 meters or 2,041 feet), as the site is known. The church has an octagonal nave and a smaller square chancel with beveled corners. The cupola rises 27 meters (89 ft) and is topped by a belfry with a Baroque roof. The church is probably based on the Renaissance Coronation of the Virgin Church in Lodi, Italy, which was a model for many later churches in Slovenia.
