= Vinice =

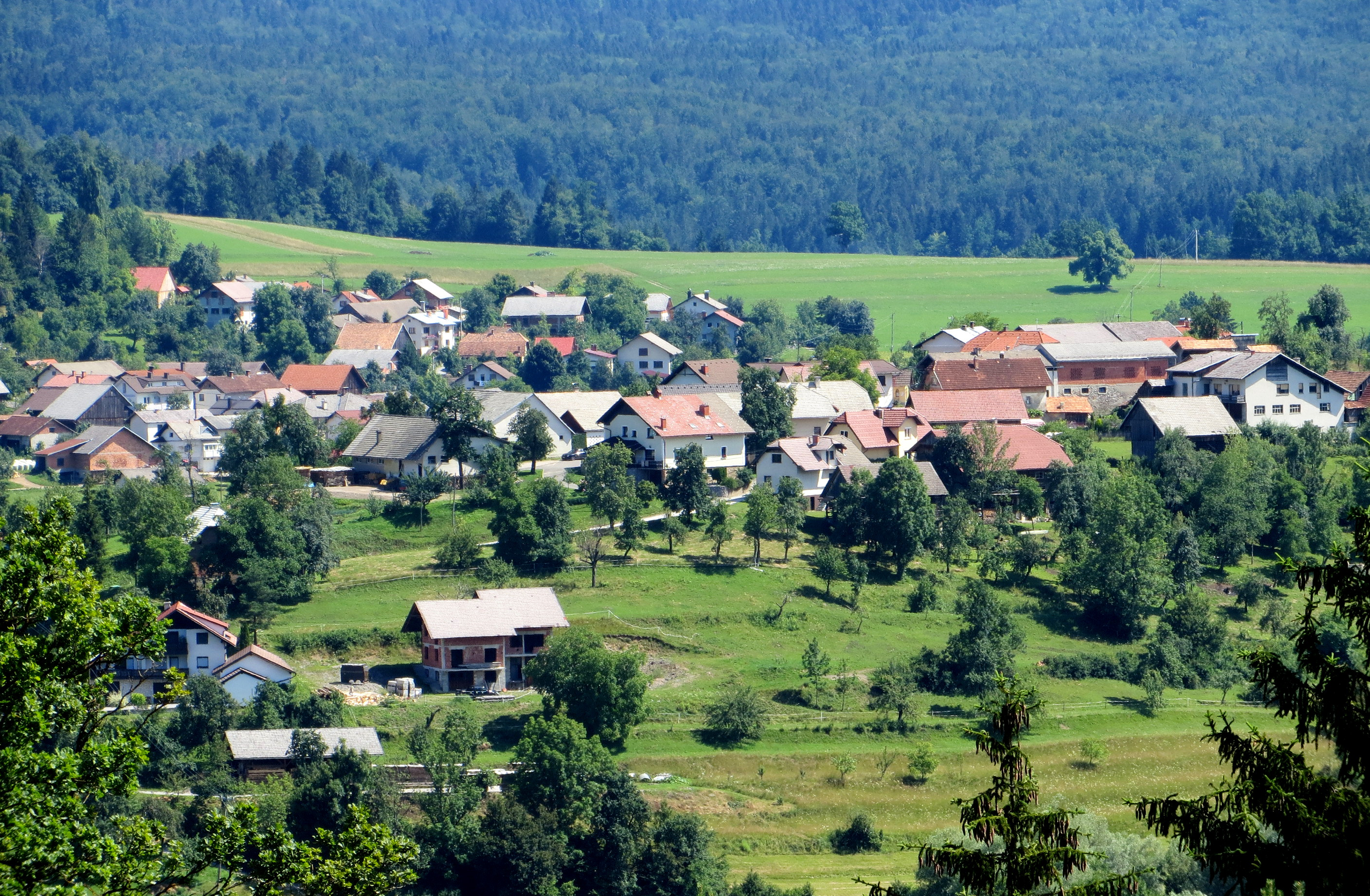

- Location in Slovenia
- Coordinates: 45°45′20.78″N 14°40′12.06″E
- Country: Slovenia
- Traditional region: Lower Carniola
- Statistical region: Southeast Slovenia
- Municipality: Sodražica

Area
  - Total: 1.2 km^{2} (0.46 sq mi)
- Elevation: 538.8 m (1,768 ft)

Population (2002)
  - Total: 101
- Postal code: 1317

Vinice (pronounced [ˈʋiːnitsɛ]; German: Weinitz) is a settlement in the Municipality of Sodražica in southern Slovenia. It lies just off the main road to Ribnica. The area is part of the traditional region of Lower Carniola and is now included in the Southeast Slovenia Statistical Region.

== Name ==
The plural name Vinice (as well as the singular Vinica) likely derives from a forgotten meaning of the common noun vinica (now 'wine cellar'), probably referring to an area with vineyards (cf. Polish winnica 'vineyard').

== Notable people ==
Notable people that were born or lived in Vinice include:

- Ivan Prijatelj (1875–1937), literary historian
