= Brlog, Krško =

Brlog
- Location in Slovenia
- Coordinates: 45°50′47.52″N 15°29′15.77″E
- Country: Slovenia
- Traditional region: Lower Carniola
- Statistical region: Lower Sava
- Municipality: Krško

Area
  - Total: 0.58 km^{2} (0.22 sq mi)
- Elevation: 367.1 m (1,204 ft)

Population (2002)
  - Total: 23

Brlog (pronounced [bəɾˈlɔk]) is a small settlement in the Gorjanci Mountains in the Municipality of Krško in eastern Slovenia. The area is part of the traditional region of Lower Carniola. It is now included in the Lower Sava Statistical Region.

In 1973 a flash flood uncovered the entrance to Levak Cave (Slovene: Levakova jama). Speleologists found a human skull and other small artefacts. In 1975 the cave was excavated to reveal prehistoric Bronze Age and Roman occupation levels.
