= Brlog, Serbia =

Village in the municipality of Pirot, Serbia

Brlog
- Village
- Location within Serbia
- Country: Serbia
- Region: Southern and Eastern Serbia
- District: Pirot
- Municipality: Pirot

Population (2002)
  - Total: 83
- Time zone: UTC+1 (CET)
  - Summer (DST): UTC+2 (CEST)

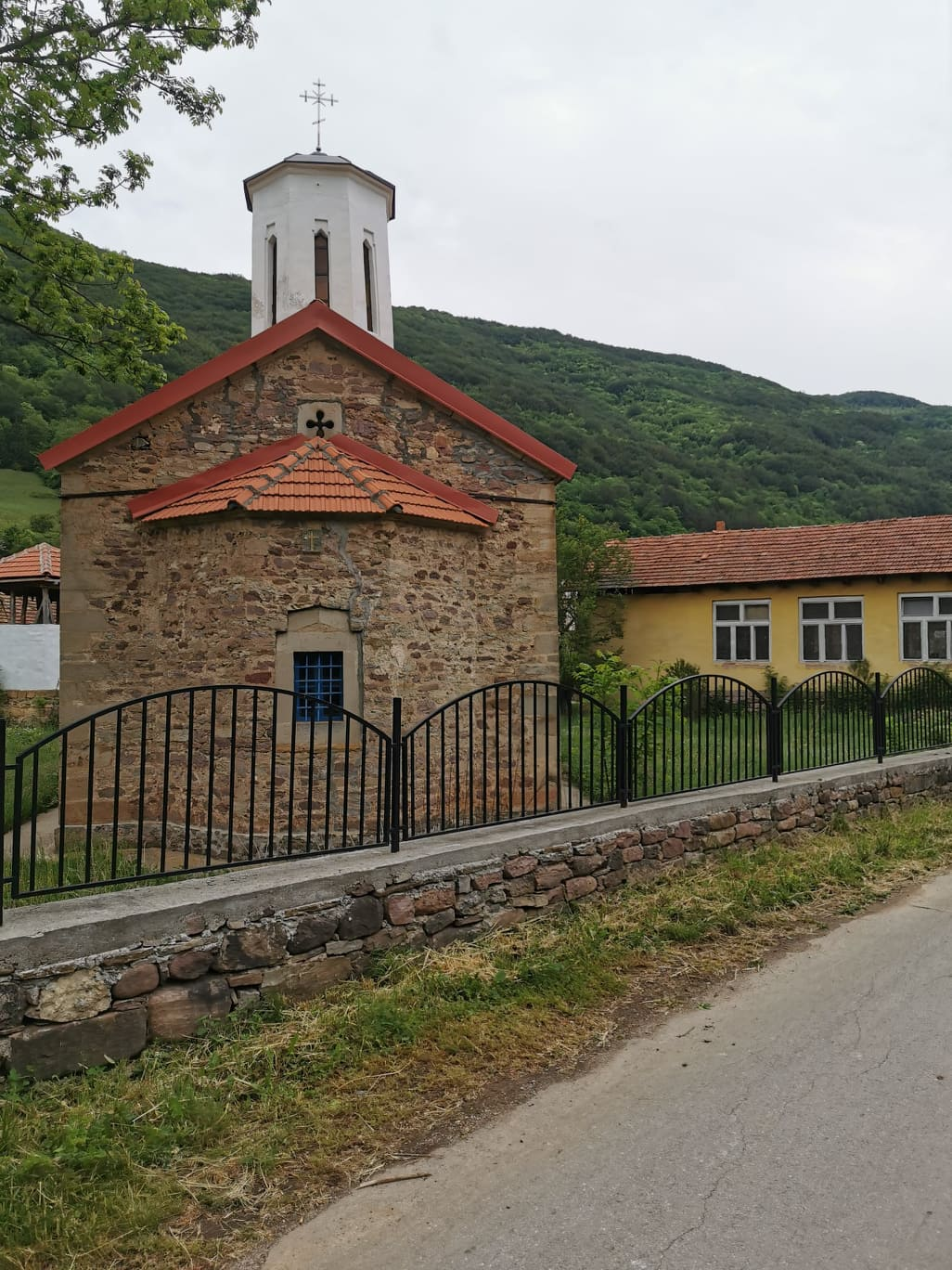

Brlog is a village in the municipality of Pirot, Serbia. According to the 2002 census, the village has a population of 83 people.
