= Dobravlje, Ajdovščina =

Dobravlje
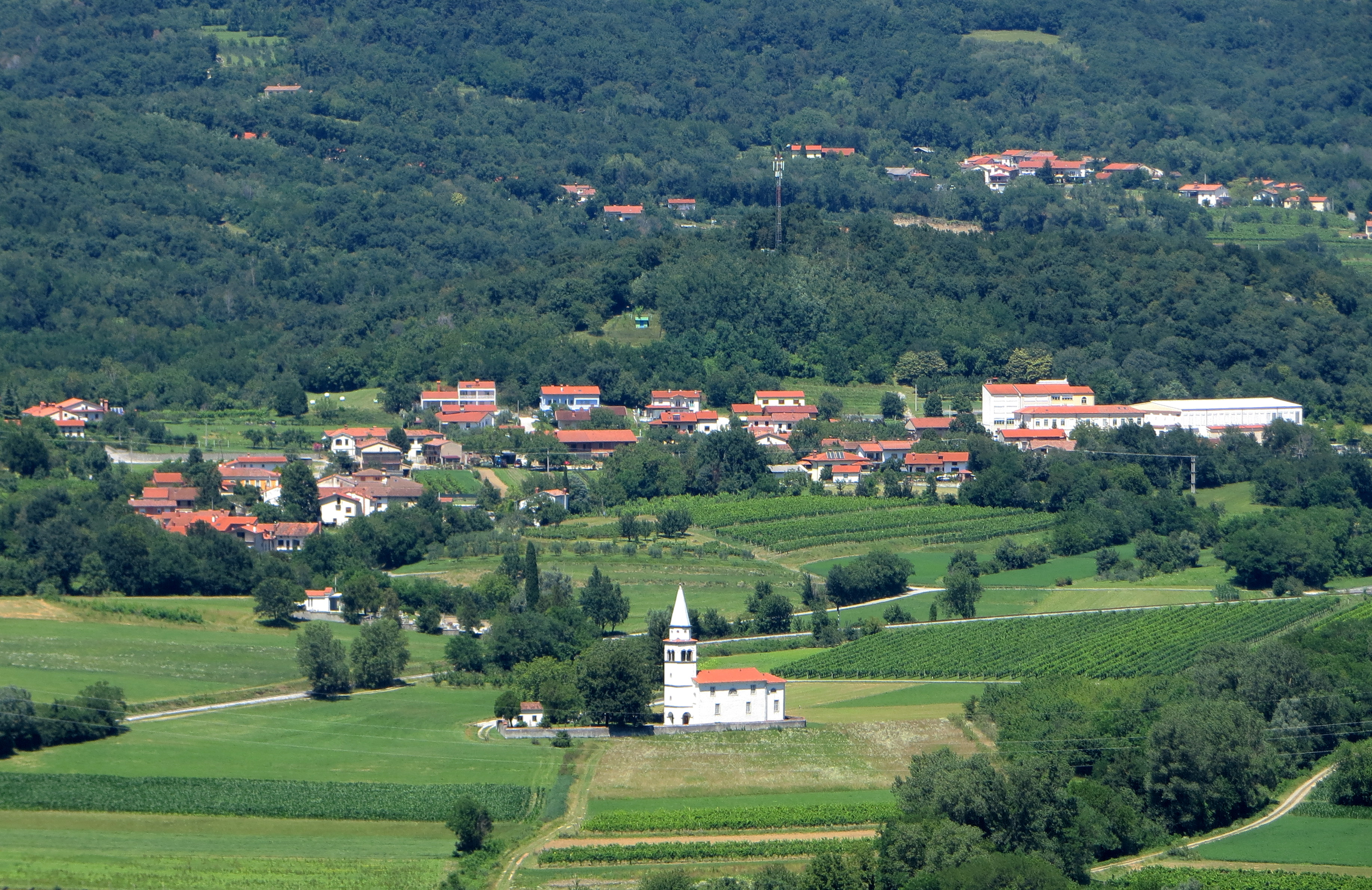

- Location in Slovenia
- Coordinates: 45°53′2.63″N 13°50′49.24″E
- Country: Slovenia
- Traditional region: Littoral
- Statistical region: Gorizia
- Municipality: Ajdovščina

Area
  - Total: 3.18 km^{2} (1.23 sq mi)
- Elevation: 118.7 m (389 ft)

Population (2020)
  - Total: 464

Dobravlje (pronounced [dɔˈbɾaːu̯ljɛ]) is a village in the Vipava Valley in the Municipality of Ajdovščina in the Littoral region of Slovenia.

== Church ==
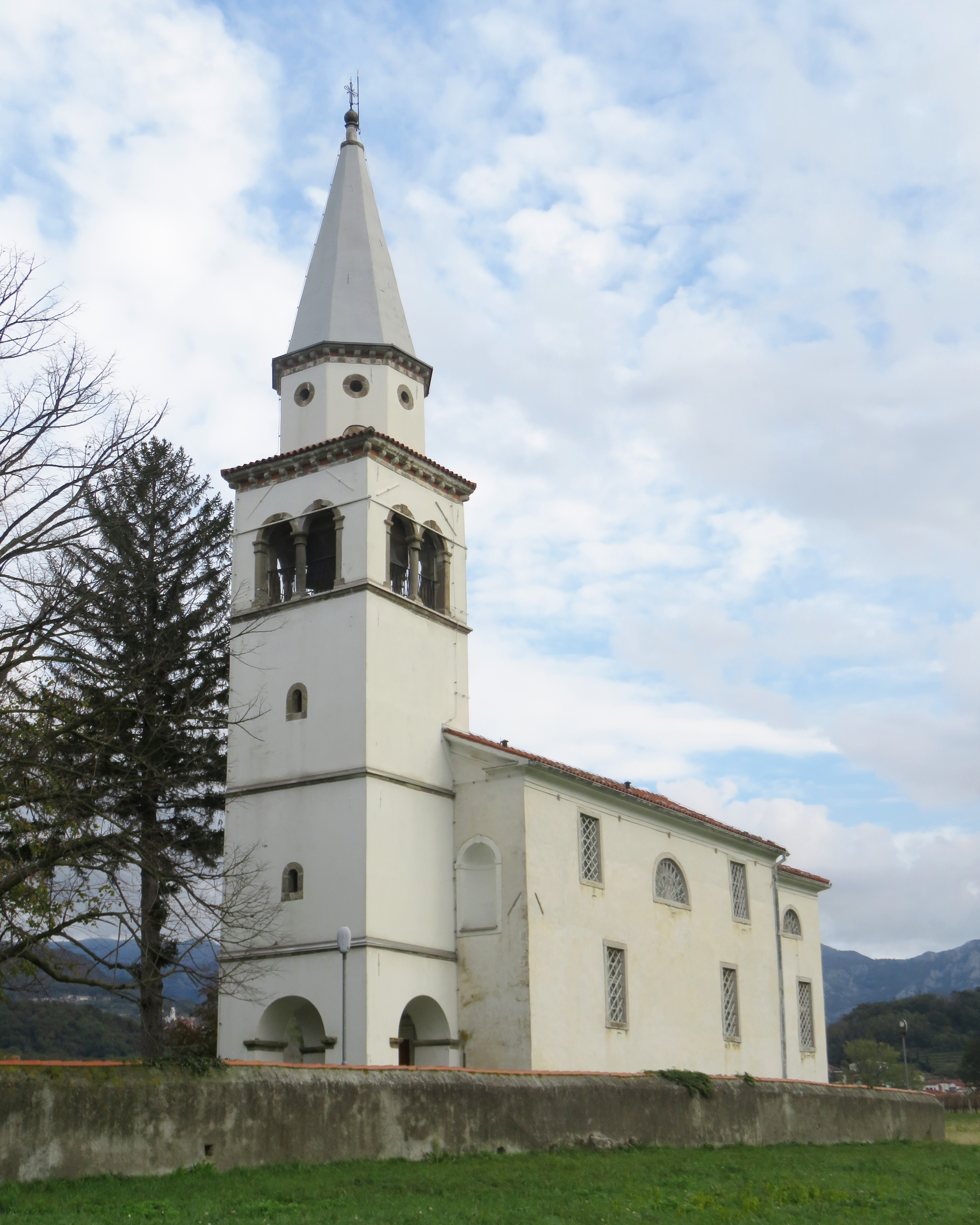
Saint Peter's Church

The local church is dedicated to Saint Peter and belongs to the Parish of Vipavski Križ. It dates to 1641 and contains paintings by the Slovenian Baroque painter Anton Čebej from 1768.
