= Municipality of Sodražica =

Municipality of Slovenia

Municipality of Sodražica Občina Sodražica
- Municipality
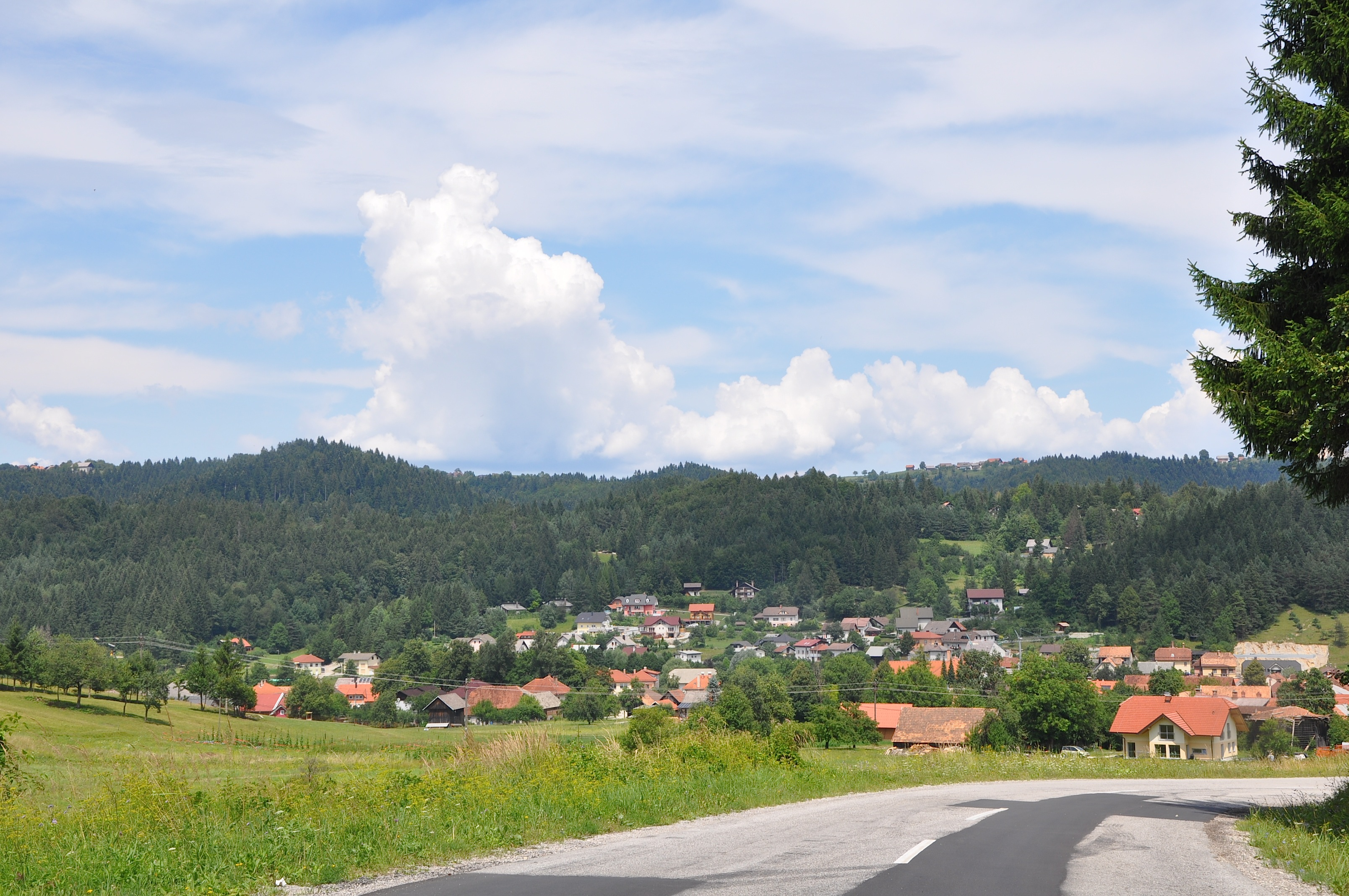

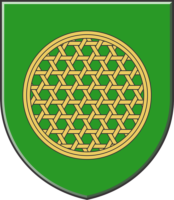
- Coat of arms

- Location of the Municipality of Sodražica in Slovenia
- Coordinates: 45°45′51″N 14°37′46″E
- Country: Slovenia

Government
  - Mayor: Blaž Milavec (Slovenian People's Party)

Area
  - Total: 49.5 km^{2} (19.1 sq mi)

Population (2011)
  - Total: 2,164
  - Density: 43.7/km^{2} (113/sq mi)
- Time zone: UTC+01 (CET)
  - Summer (DST): UTC+02 (CEST)
- Postal code: 1317 Sodražica
- Website: www.sodrazica.si

The Municipality of Sodražica (pronounced [ˈsoːdɾaʒitsa]; Slovene: Občina Sodražica) is a municipality in the Lower Carniola region of Slovenia. The seat of the municipality is the town of Sodražica. It is included in the Southeast Slovenia Statistical Region. It borders the municipalities of Ribnica, Velike Lašče, Bloke, and Loški Potok.

In Austro-Hungary, and also in the Kingdom of Yugoslavia, Sodražica was an independent municipality, until the creation of Socialist Federative Republic of Yugoslavia. It became an independent municipality once again in 1998, when it separated from the Municipality of Ribnica.

Historically, the inhabitants made woodenware (Slovene: suha roba), especially sieve rims, buckets, spoons, rakes, and wicker baskets. The woodenware was sold to Ribnica peddlers (ribniški krošnjarji) who then travelled around the world, selling the woodenware.

== Settlements ==
In addition to the municipal seat of Sodražica, the municipality also includes the following settlements:

- Betonovo
- Brlog
- Globel
- Janeži
- Jelovec
- Kotel
- Kračali
- Kržeti
- Lipovšica
- Male Vinice
- Nova Štifta
- Novi Pot
- Petrinci
- Podklanec
- Preska
- Ravni Dol
- Sinovica
- Travna Gora
- Vinice
- Zamostec
- Zapotok
- Žimarice

== Notable people ==
- Karlo Adamič (1887–1945), composer, organist, and conductor
- Mihael Arko (1857–1938), priest, journalist, and representative in the Austrian parliament
- France Gorše (1897–1986), academy-trained sculptor
- Tone Košmrlj (born 1959), founder and the former bass player in Pop Design
- Franc Mihelič (born 1949), musician and founder of the Franc Mihelič Ensemble (Ansambel Franca Miheliča)
- Matija Mrače (1866–1903), translator
- Ivan Prijatelj (1875–1937), literary historian, university professor, translator, and essayist. The primary school in Sodražica bears his name: Osnovna šola dr. Ivana Prijatelja Sodražica (Ivan Prijatelj Sodražica Elementary School).
