= Sodražica =

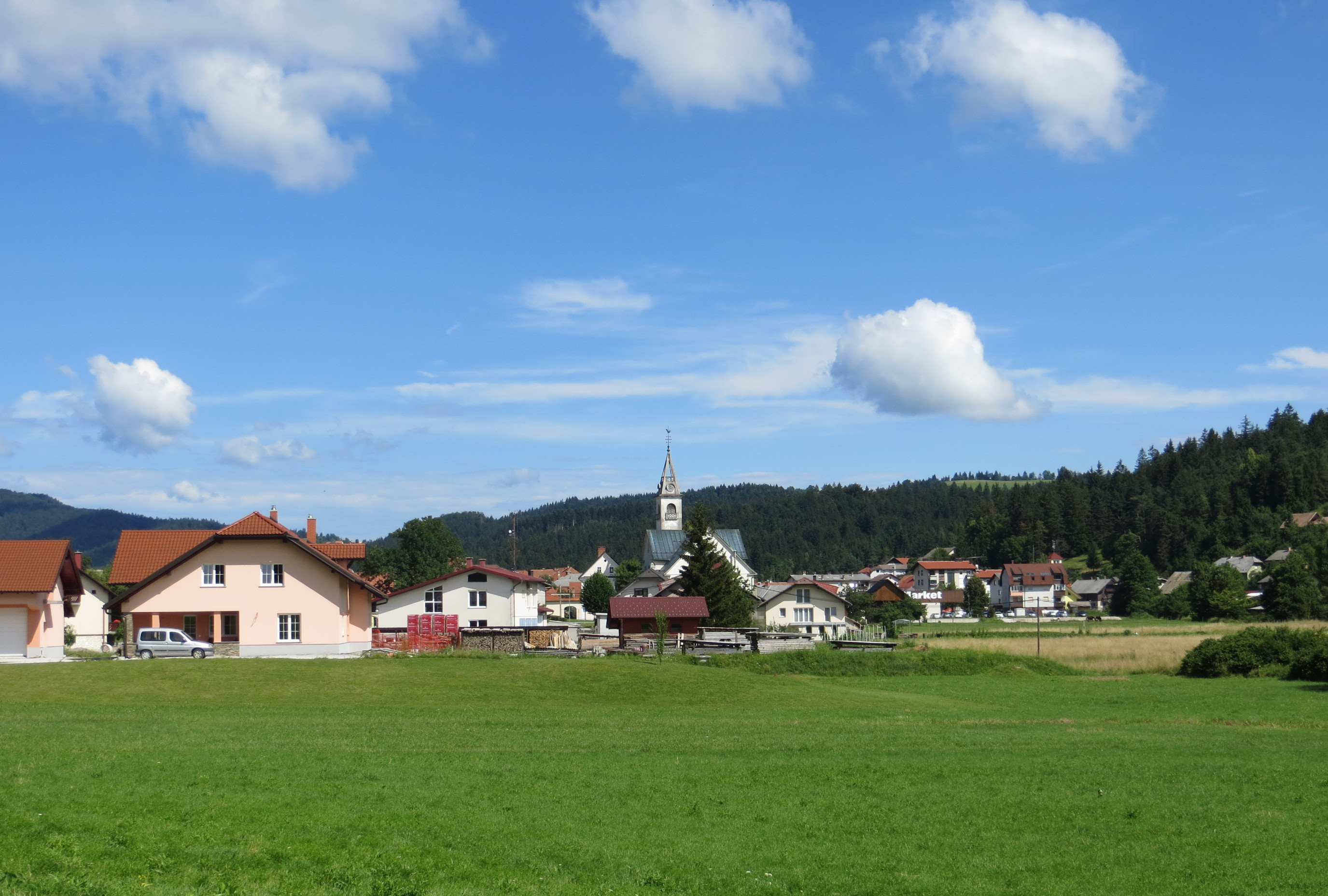

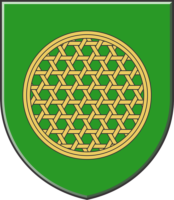
- Coat of arms

- Location in Slovenia
- Coordinates: 45°45′41.79″N 14°38′10.68″E
- Country: Slovenia
- Traditional region: Lower Carniola
- Statistical region: Southeast Slovenia
- Municipality: Sodražica

Area
  - Total: 10.0 km^{2} (3.9 sq mi)
- Elevation: 538 m (1,765 ft)

Population (2013)
  - Total: 842
- Postal code: 1317

Sodražica (pronounced [ˈsoːdɾaʒitsa]; German: Soderschitz) is a town in southern Slovenia. It is the seat of the Municipality of Sodražica. It is part of the traditional region of Lower Carniola and is now included in the Southeast Slovenia Statistical Region.

== Name ==
Sodražica was attested in historical sources as Stoidrasicz in 1220, Stodrositz in 1343, and Stodersicz and Stodrasicz in 1436. The name is believed to derive from the Slavic personal name *Stojьdragъ or *Stojьdražь, referring to an early person associated with the settlement. An older and less likely theory derives the name from sodraga 'gorge, ravine'.

== Church ==
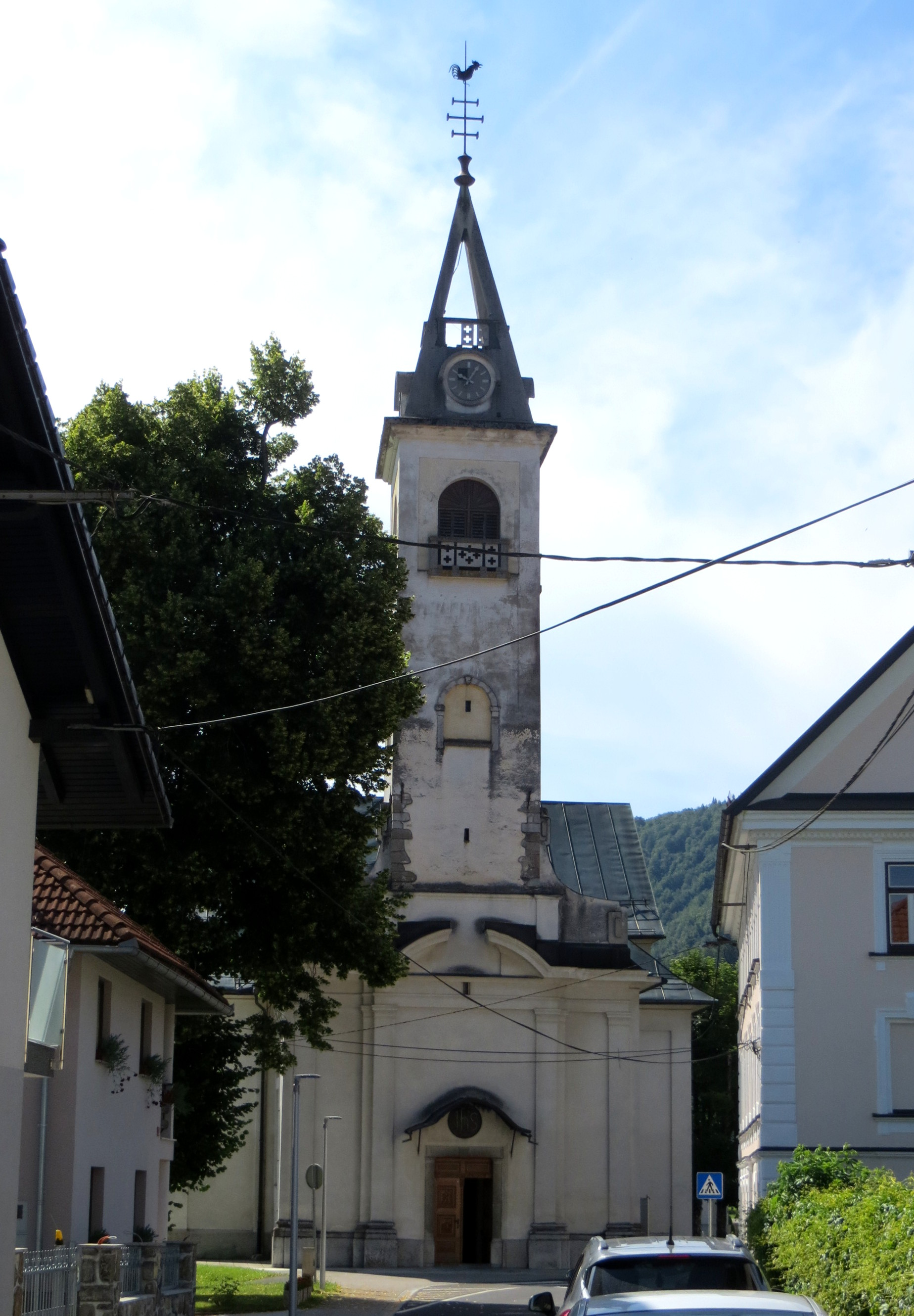
View from west

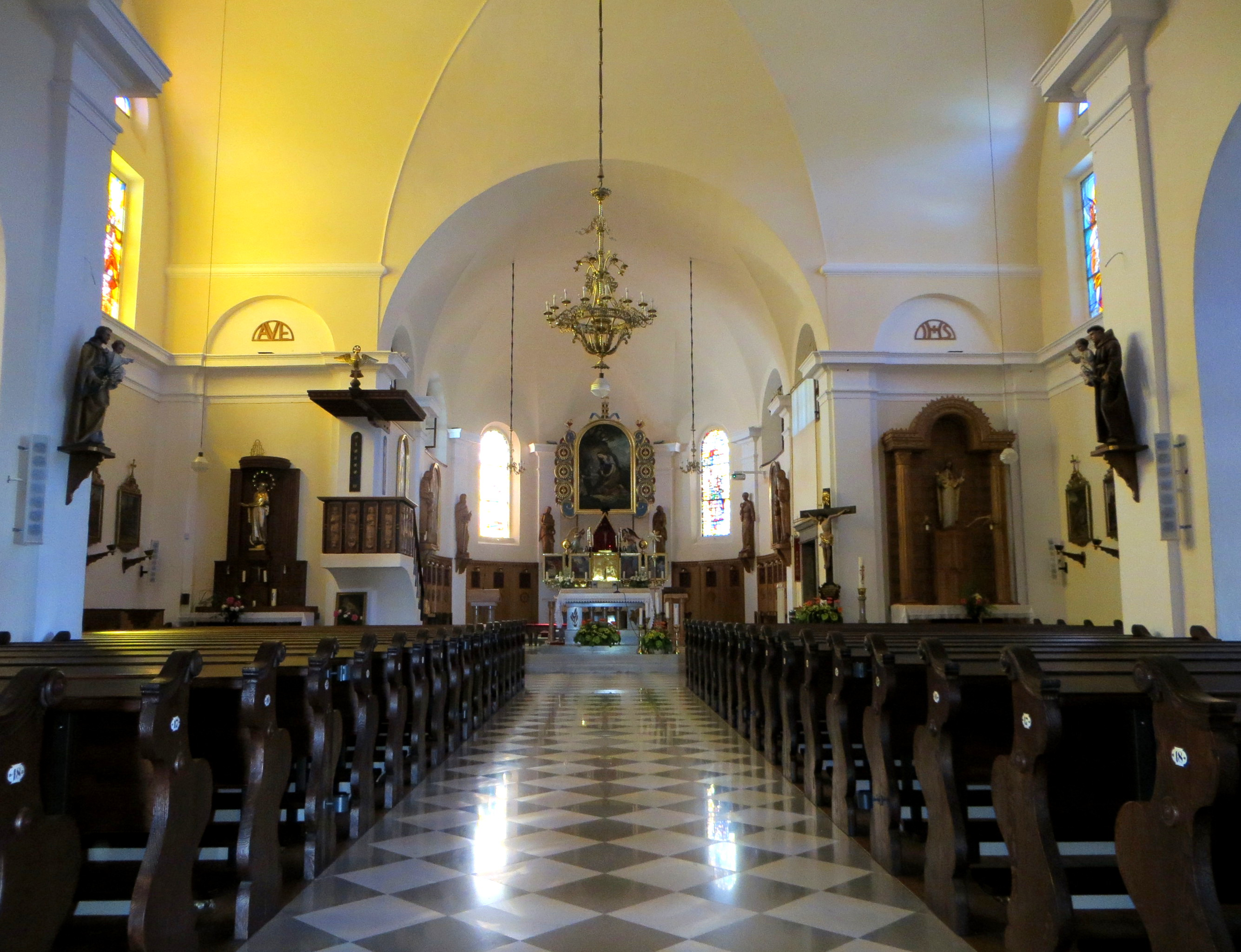
Church interior

Saint Mary Magdalene Church

The parish church in the settlement is dedicated to Mary Magdalene and belongs to the Roman Catholic Archdiocese of Ljubljana. It was built in the mid-18th century on the site of an earlier chapel dedicated to Saint Nicholas. It was renovated in 1836 and extended in 1928. The main aisle altar in the church was designed by the architect Ivan Vurnik.
